= List of Trachelidae species =

This page lists all described species of the spider family Trachelidae accepted by the World Spider Catalog as of February 2021:

== A ==
=== Afroceto ===
Afroceto Lyle & Haddad, 2010

- A. africana (Simon, 1910) — Namibia, South Africa, Lesotho
- A. ansieae Lyle, 2015 — South Africa
- A. bisulca Lyle & Haddad, 2010 — South Africa
- A. bulla Lyle & Haddad, 2010 — South Africa
- A. capensis Lyle & Haddad, 2010 — South Africa
- A. coenosa (Simon, 1897) — South Africa
- A. corcula Lyle & Haddad, 2010 — South Africa
- A. croeseri Lyle & Haddad, 2010 — South Africa
- A. dippenaarae Lyle, 2015 — South Africa
- A. flabella Lyle & Haddad, 2010 — South Africa
- A. gracilis Lyle & Haddad, 2010 — South Africa
- A. martini (Simon, 1897) (type) — East, Southern Africa
- A. plana Lyle & Haddad, 2010 — South Africa, Malawi
- A. porrecta Lyle & Haddad, 2010 — South Africa
- A. rotunda Lyle & Haddad, 2010 — South Africa
- A. spicula Lyle & Haddad, 2010 — South Africa

== C ==
=== Cetonana ===
Cetonana

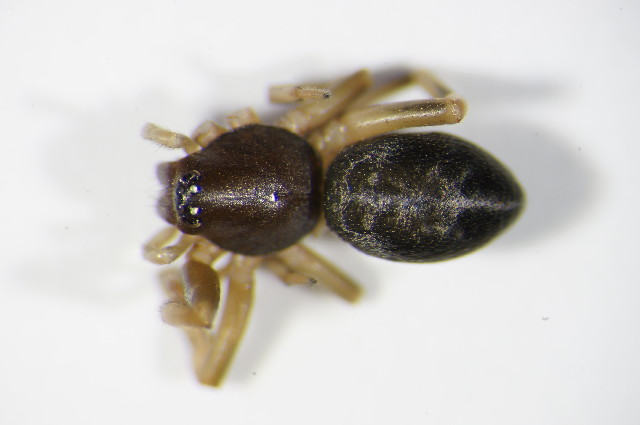
Cetonana laticeps

Cetonana Strand, 1929

- C. laticeps (Canestrini, 1868) (type) — Europe, Russia (Caucasus)
- C. petrunkevitchi Mello-Leitão, 1945 — Brazil
- C. shaanxiensis Jin, Yin & Zhang, 2017 — China

== F ==
=== Fuchiba ===
Fuchiba Haddad & Lyle, 2008

- F. aquilonia Haddad & Lyle, 2008 (type) — Botswana, Mozambique, South Africa
- F. capensis Haddad & Lyle, 2008 — South Africa
- F. montana Haddad & Lyle, 2008 — South Africa, Lesotho
- F. similis Haddad & Lyle, 2008 — South Africa
- F. tortilis Haddad & Lyle, 2008 — South Africa
- F. venteri Haddad & Lyle, 2008 — South Africa

=== Fuchibotulus ===
Fuchibotulus Haddad & Lyle, 2008

- F. bicornis Haddad & Lyle, 2008 (type) — South Africa
- F. haddadi Lyle, 2013 — South Africa
- F. kigelia Haddad & Lyle, 2008 — South Africa, Mozambique

== J ==
=== Jocquestus ===
Jocquestus Lyle & Haddad, 2018

- J. capensis Lyle & Haddad, 2018 — South Africa
- J. griswoldi Lyle & Haddad, 2018 — Tanzania
- J. harrisi Lyle & Haddad, 2018 — South Africa
- J. incurvus Lyle & Haddad, 2018 — South Africa
- J. obliquus Lyle & Haddad, 2018 — Tanzania
- J. roeweri (Lawrence, 1938) — South Africa
- J. schenkeli (Lessert, 1923) (type) — D.R. Congo, Zimbabwe, Mozambique, South Africa, Angola?

== M ==
=== Meriola ===
Meriola Banks, 1895

- M. arcifera (Simon, 1886) — Bolivia, Brazil, Uruguay, Chile, Argentina. Introduced to Easter Is. and Robinson Crusoe Is. (Chile), USA (California, Hawaii)
- M. avalosi Gonzáles Márquez, Grismado & Ramírez, 2021 — Argentina
- M. balcarce Platnick & Ewing, 1995 — Argentina
- M. californica (Banks, 1904) — USA, Mexico
- M. cetiformis (Strand, 1908) — Peru, Bolivia, Brazil, Uruguay, Chile, Argentina
- M. davidi Grismado, 2004 — Argentina
- M. decepta Banks, 1895 (type) — Canada, USA, Mexico, Guatemala, Colombia, Ecuador, Peru, Brazil
- M. fasciata (Mello-Leitão, 1941) — Brazil, Uruguay, Argentina
- M. foraminosa (Keyserling, 1891) — Venezuela, Ecuador, Peru, Brazil, Chile, Argentina
- M. gallina Platnick & Ewing, 1995 — Chile
- M. goloboffi Platnick & Ewing, 1995 — Chile, Argentina
- M. lineolata (Mello-Leitão, 1941) — Brazil, Argentina
- M. longitarsis (Simon, 1904) — Chile, Argentina
- M. macrocephala (Nicolet, 1849) — Chile
- M. manuel Platnick & Ewing, 1995 — Chile
- M. mauryi Platnick & Ewing, 1995 — Brazil, Argentina
- M. nague Platnick & Ewing, 1995 — Chile
- M. penai Platnick & Ewing, 1995 — Chile, Argentina
- M. peras Gonzáles Márquez, Grismado & Ramírez, 2021 — Argentina
- M. puyehue Platnick & Ewing, 1995 — Chile, Argentina
- M. quilicura Platnick & Ewing, 1995 — Chile, Argentina
- M. rahue Platnick & Ewing, 1995 — Chile, Argentina
- M. ramirezi Platnick & Ewing, 1995 — Argentina
- M. setosa (Simon, 1897) — Brazil, Uruguay, Argentina
- M. tablas Platnick & Ewing, 1995 — Chile, Argentina
- M. teresita Platnick & Ewing, 1995 — Brazil, Uruguay, Argentina
- M. virgata (Simon, 1904) — Chile

=== Metatrachelas ===
Metatrachelas Bosselaers & Bosmans, 2010

- M. amabilis (Simon, 1878) — Algeria, Tunisia
- M. macrochelis (Wunderlich, 1992) — Spain, Canary Is., Azores, Algeria
- M. rayi (Simon, 1878) (type) — Portugal, Spain, France, Italy, Albania, Bulgaria, Algeria

== O ==
=== Orthobula ===
Orthobula Simon, 1897

- O. bilobata Deeleman-Reinhold, 2001 — Indonesia (Sumatra, Borneo, Lesser Sunda Is.)
- O. calceata Simon, 1897 — Sierra Leone
- O. charitonovi (Mikhailov, 1986) — Eastern Mediterranean to Central Asia
- O. chayuensis Yang, Song & Zhu, 2003 — China
- O. crucifera Bösenberg & Strand, 1906 — China, Korea, Japan
- O. impressa Simon, 1897 (type) — India, Sri Lanka, Seychelles, Reunion
- O. infima Simon, 1896 — South Africa
- O. milloti Caporiacco, 1949 — Kenya
- O. puncta Yang, Song & Zhu, 2003 — China
- O. pura Deeleman-Reinhold, 2001 — Indonesia (Sulawesi)
- O. qinghaiensis Hu, 2001 — China
- O. quadrinotata Deeleman-Reinhold, 2001 — Indonesia (Sulawesi)
- O. radiata Simon, 1897 — South Africa
- O. sicca Simon, 1903 — Madagascar
- O. spiniformis Tso, Zhu, Zhang & Zhang, 2005 — Taiwan
- O. tibenensis Hu, 2001 — China
- O. trinotata Simon, 1896 — Philippines
- O. yaginumai Platnick, 1977 — China
- O. zhangmuensis Hu & Li, 1987 — China

== P ==
=== Paccius ===
Paccius Simon, 1898

- P. angulatus Platnick, 2000 — Madagascar
- P. elevatus Platnick, 2000 — Madagascar
- P. griswoldi Platnick, 2000 — Madagascar
- P. madagascariensis (Simon, 1889) (type) — Madagascar
- P. mucronatus Simon, 1898 — Madagascar
- P. quadridentatus Simon, 1898 — Seychelles
- P. quinteri Platnick, 2000 — Madagascar
- P. scharffi Platnick, 2000 — Madagascar

=== Paraceto ===
Paraceto Jin, Yin & Zhang, 2017

- P. orientalis (Schenkel, 1936) — China, Korea
- P. spiralis Jin, Yin & Zhang, 2017 (type) — China

=== Paratrachelas ===
Paratrachelas Kovblyuk & Nadolny, 2009

- P. acuminus (Zhu & An, 1988) — Russia (Far East), China, Korea
- P. atlantis Bosselaers & Bosmans, 2010 — Algeria
- P. ibericus (Bosselaers, Urones, Barrientos & Alberdi, 2009) — Portugal, Spain, France, Algeria
- P. maculatus (Thorell, 1875) (type) — France to Ukraine, Turkey, Israel
- P. validus (Simon, 1884) — Portugal, Spain, Italy

=== Patelloceto ===
Patelloceto Lyle & Haddad, 2010

- P. denticulata Lyle & Haddad, 2010 — Ethiopia
- P. media Lyle & Haddad, 2010 — Central, East Africa
- P. secutor Lyle & Haddad, 2010 (type) — Southern Africa

=== Planochelas ===
Planochelas Lyle & Haddad, 2009

- P. botulus Lyle & Haddad, 2009 (type) — Ghana, Uganda
- P. brevis Khoza & Lyle, 2019 — DR Congo
- P. dentatus Lyle & Haddad, 2009 — Ivory Coast
- P. haddadi Khoza & Lyle, 2019 — South Africa
- P. jocquei Khoza & Lyle, 2019 — DR Congo
- P. neethlingi Khoza & Lyle, 2019 — South Africa
- P. purpureus Lyle & Haddad, 2009 — Ivory Coast

=== Poachelas ===
Poachelas Haddad & Lyle, 2008

- P. montanus Haddad & Lyle, 2008 — South Africa
- P. refugus Haddad, 2010 — South Africa
- P. solitarius Haddad & Lyle, 2008 — Zimbabwe
- P. striatus Haddad & Lyle, 2008 (type) — South Africa

== S ==
=== Spinotrachelas ===
Spinotrachelas Haddad, 2006

- S. capensis Haddad, 2006 (type) — South Africa
- S. confinis Lyle, 2011 — South Africa
- S. montanus Haddad, Neethling & Lyle, 2011 — South Africa
- S. namaquensis Lyle, 2011 — South Africa
- S. similis Lyle, 2011 — South Africa

== T ==
=== Thysanina ===
Thysanina Simon, 1910

- T. absolvo Lyle & Haddad, 2006 — South Africa
- T. capensis Lyle & Haddad, 2006 — South Africa
- T. gracilis Lyle & Haddad, 2006 — Namibia, South Africa
- T. serica Simon, 1910 (type) — Namibia, South Africa
- T. similis Lyle & Haddad, 2006 — Tanzania
- T. transversa Lyle & Haddad, 2006 — South Africa

=== Trachelas ===
Trachelas

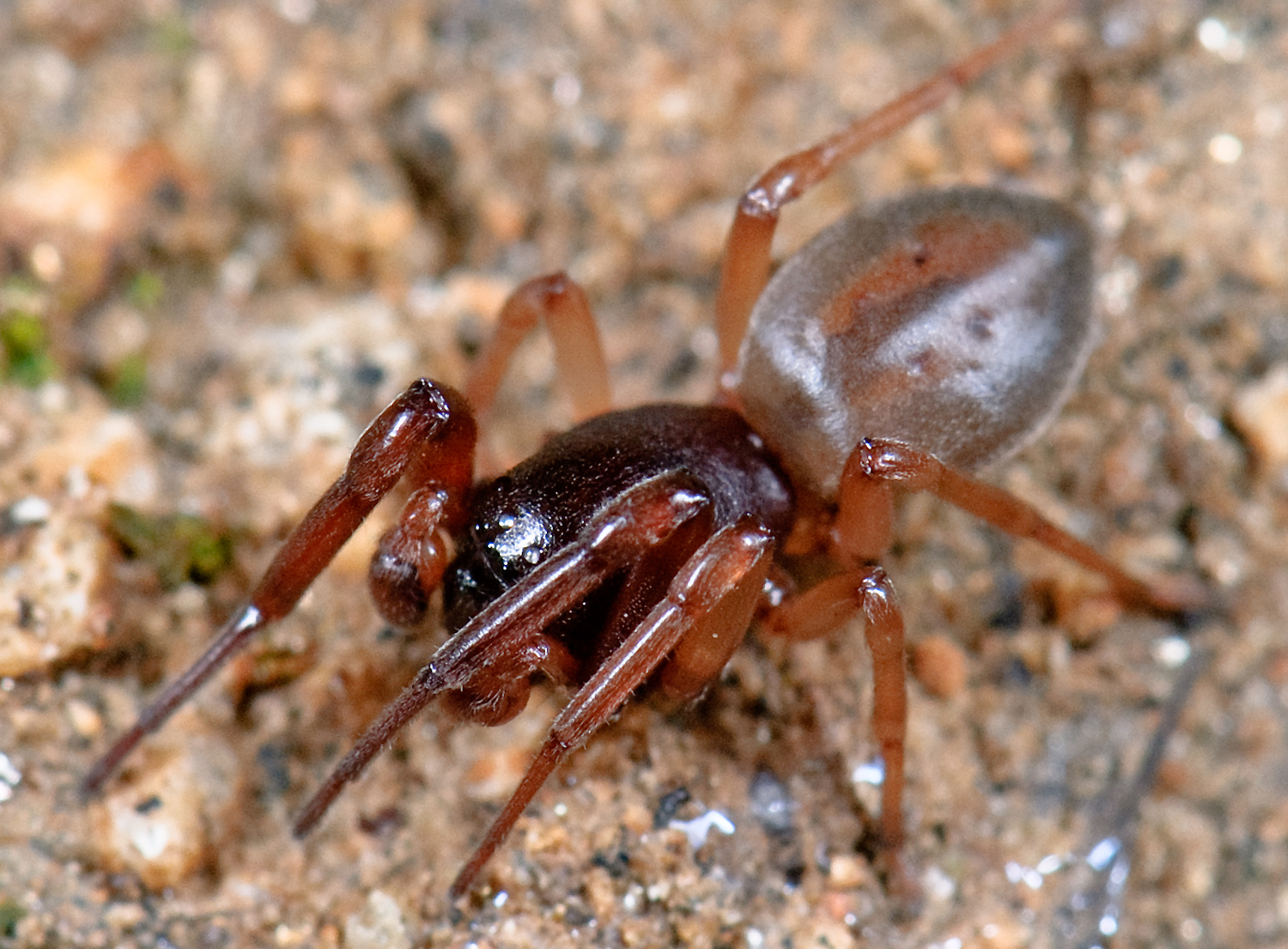
Trachelas pacificus, male

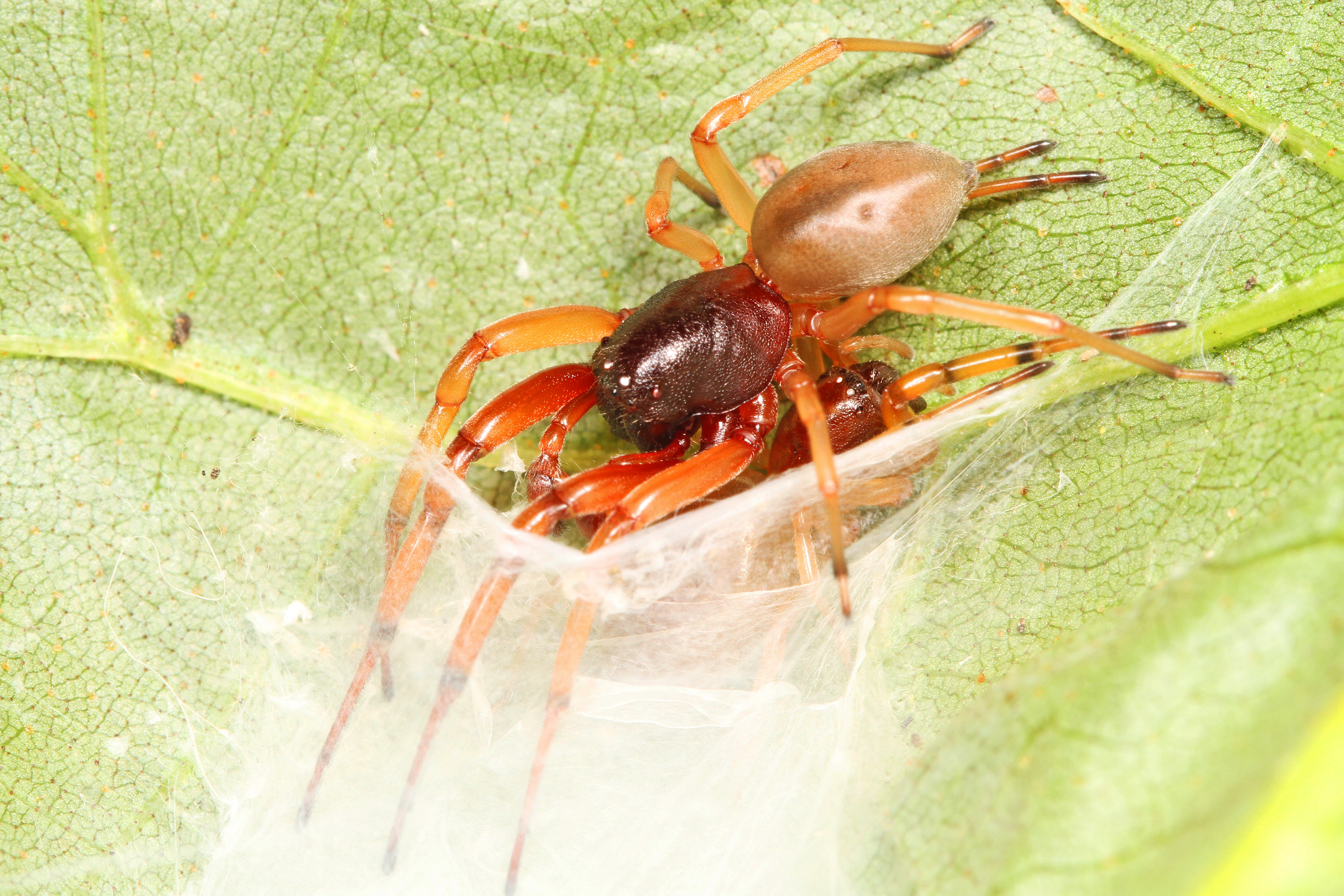
Broad faced sac spider
(Trachelas tranquillus)

Trachelas L. Koch, 1872

- T. alticola Hu, 2001 — China
- T. anomalus (Taczanowski, 1874) — French Guiana
- T. barroanus Chamberlin, 1925 — Panama
- T. bicolor Keyserling, 1887 — Hispaniola
- T. bispinosus F. O. Pickard-Cambridge, 1899 — Mexico to Panama, Trinidad
- T. borinquensis Gertsch, 1942 — Puerto Rico
- T. brachialis Jin, Yin & Zhang, 2017 — China
- T. bravidus Chickering, 1972 — Jamaica
- T. bulbosus F. O. Pickard-Cambridge, 1899 — Mexico to El Salvador
- T. cadulus Chickering, 1972 — Jamaica
- T. cambridgei Kraus, 1955 — El Salvador to Panama
- T. canariensis Wunderlich, 1987 — Spain, Canary Is., Africa
- T. chamoli Quasin, Siliwal & Uniyal, 2018 — India
- T. chubbi Lessert, 1921 — East Africa
- T. contractus Platnick & Shadab, 1974 — Cuba
- T. costatus O. Pickard-Cambridge, 1885 — Pakistan, India
- T. crassus Rivera-Quiroz & Álvarez-Padilla, 2015 — Mexico
- T. crewsae Marusik & Fomichev, 2020 — Tajikistan
- T. daubei Schmidt, 1971 — Ecuador
- T. depressus Platnick & Shadab, 1974 — Mexico
- T. devi Biswas & Raychaudhuri, 2000 — Bangladesh
- T. digitus Platnick & Shadab, 1974 — Costa Rica
- T. dilatus Platnick & Shadab, 1974 — Hispaniola
- T. ductonuda Rivera-Quiroz & Álvarez-Padilla, 2015 — Mexico
- T. ecudobus Chickering, 1972 — Panama, Trinidad
- T. erectus Platnick & Shadab, 1974 — Hispaniola
- T. fanjingshan Zhang, Fu & Zhu, 2009 — China
- T. fasciae Zhang, Fu & Zhu, 2009 — China
- T. femoralis Simon, 1898 — St. Vincent
- T. fuscus Platnick & Shadab, 1974 — Mexico
- T. gaoligongensis Jin, Yin & Zhang, 2017 — China
- T. giganteus Platnick & Shadab, 1974 — Jamaica
- T. gigapophysis Jin, Yin & Zhang, 2017 — China
- T. hamatus Platnick & Shadab, 1974 — Mexico
- T. hassleri Gertsch, 1942 — Guyana
- T. himalayensis Biswas, 1993 — India
- T. huachucanus Gertsch, 1942 — USA, Mexico
- T. inclinatus Platnick & Shadab, 1974 — Cuba
- T. jamaicensis Gertsch, 1942 — Jamaica
- T. japonicus Bösenberg & Strand, 1906 — Russia (Far East), China, Korea, Japan
- T. lanceolatus F. O. Pickard-Cambridge, 1899 — Mexico
- T. latus Platnick & Shadab, 1974 — Mexico, Guatemala
- T. mexicanus Banks, 1898 — USA, Mexico
- T. minor O. Pickard-Cambridge, 1872 (type) — Mediterranean to Central Asia, West Africa
- T. mombachensis Leister & Miller, 2015 — Nicaragua
- T. mulcetus Chickering, 1972 — Jamaica
- T. nanyueensis Yin, 2012 — China
- T. niger Mello-Leitão, 1922 — Brazil
- T. nigrifemur Mello-Leitão, 1941 — Colombia
- T. oculus Platnick & Shadab, 1974 — Cuba
- T. odoreus Rivera-Quiroz & Álvarez-Padilla, 2015 — Mexico
- T. oreophilus Simon, 1906 — India, Sri Lanka
- T. organatus Platnick & Shadab, 1974 — USA, Mexico
- T. pacificus Chamberlin & Ivie, 1935 — USA, Mexico
- T. panamanus Chickering, 1937 — Panama
- T. parallelus Platnick & Shadab, 1974 — Nicaragua
- T. planus Platnick & Shadab, 1974 — Costa Rica
- T. prominens Platnick & Shadab, 1974 — Mexico to Panama
- T. punctatus Simon, 1886 — Senegal
- T. pusillus Lessert, 1923 — South Africa, Lesotho
- T. quadridens Kraus, 1955 — El Salvador, Costa Rica
- T. quisquiliarum Simon, 1906 — Sri Lanka
- T. robustus Keyserling, 1891 — Brazil
- T. rotundus Platnick & Shadab, 1974 — Mexico
- T. rugosus Keyserling, 1891 — Brazil
- T. santaemartae Schmidt, 1971 — Colombia
- T. scopulifer Simon, 1896 — South Africa
- T. shilinensis Jin, Yin & Zhang, 2017 — China
- T. similis F. O. Pickard-Cambridge, 1899 — USA to Costa Rica
- T. sinensis Chen, Peng & Zhao, 1995 — China
- T. sinuosus Platnick & Shadab, 1974 — USA
- T. speciosus Banks, 1898 — Mexico
- T. spicus Platnick & Shadab, 1974 — Mexico
- T. spinulatus F. O. Pickard-Cambridge, 1899 — Central America
- T. spirifer F. O. Pickard-Cambridge, 1899 — Guatemala, Honduras
- T. submissus Gertsch, 1942 — Paraguay
- T. sylvae Caporiacco, 1949 — Kenya
- T. tanasevitchi Marusik & Kovblyuk, 2010 — Russia (Far East)
- T. tomaculus Platnick & Shadab, 1974 — Cuba, Hispaniola
- T. tranquillus (Hentz, 1847) — USA, Canada
- T. transversus F. O. Pickard-Cambridge, 1899 — Mexico, Costa Rica
- T. triangulus Platnick & Shadab, 1974 — Panama
- T. tridentatus Mello-Leitão, 1947 — Brazil
- T. trifidus Platnick & Shadab, 1974 — Panama
- T. truncatulus F. O. Pickard-Cambridge, 1899 — Mexico
- T. uniaculeatus Schmidt, 1956 — Canary Is.
- T. vitiosus Keyserling, 1891 — Brazil
- T. volutus Gertsch, 1935 — USA, Mexico
- T. vulcani Simon, 1896 — China, Japan, Indonesia (Java, Moluccas)
- T. zhui Li, Wang, Zhang & Chen, 2019 — China
- † T. poinari Penney, 2001

=== Trachelopachys ===
Trachelopachys

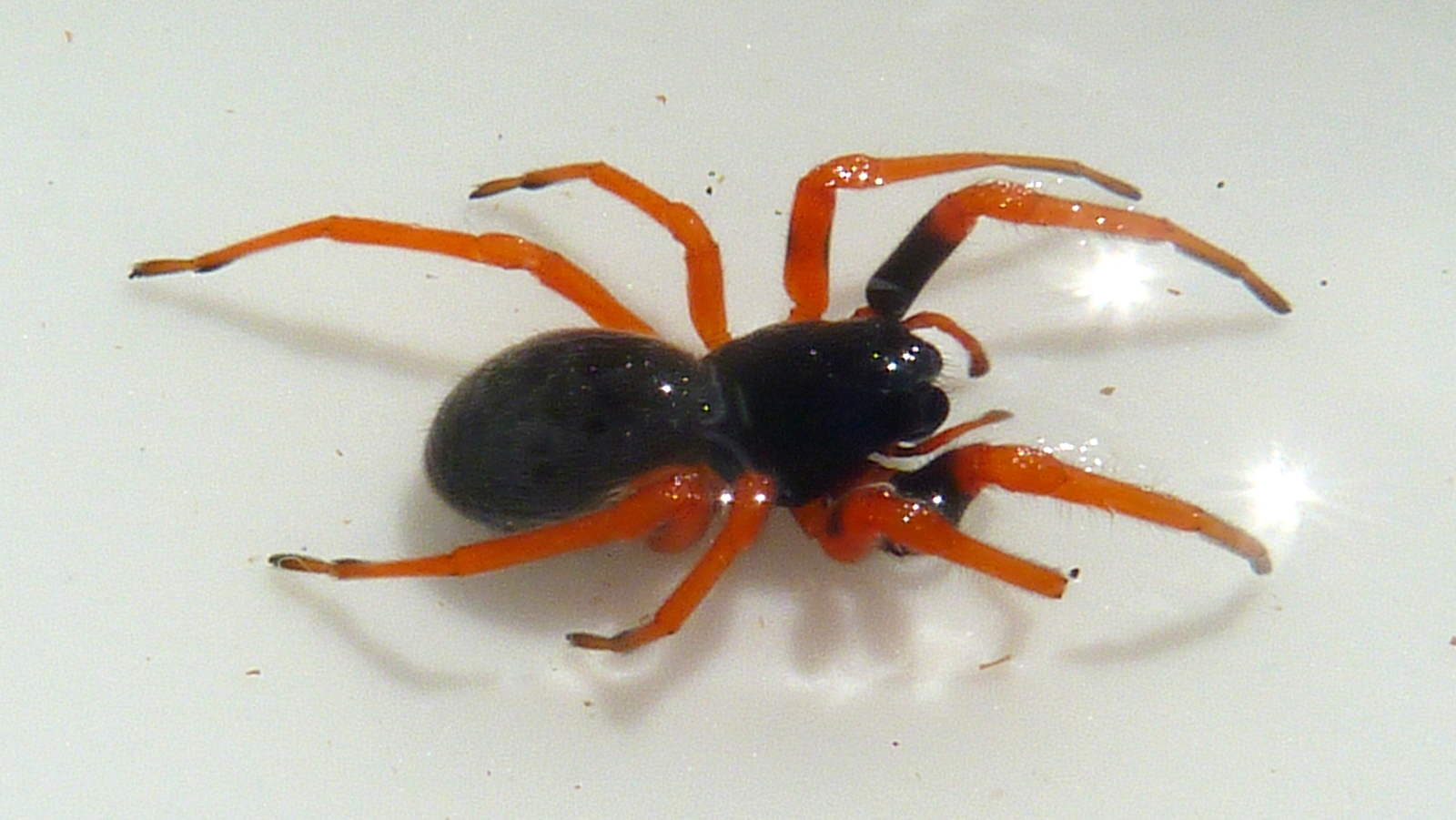
Trachelopachys gracilis

Trachelopachys Simon, 1897

- T. aemulatus Gertsch, 1942 — Paraguay
- T. ammobates Platnick & Rocha, 1995 — Brazil
- T. bicolor Chamberlin, 1916 — Peru, Bolivia
- T. bidentatus Tullgren, 1905 — Bolivia
- T. camarapi Pantoja, Saturnino & Bonaldo, 2021 — Brazil
- T. caviunae (Mello-Leitão, 1947) — Brazil
- T. cingulipes (Simon, 1886) — Argentina
- T. gracilis (Keyserling, 1891) — Brazil
- T. ignacio Platnick, 1975 — Paraguay
- T. keyserlingi (Roewer, 1951) — Brazil, Paraguay, Argentina
- T. machupicchu Platnick, 1975 — Peru
- T. magdalena Platnick, 1975 — Colombia
- T. quadriocellatus (Mello-Leitão, 1939) — Bolivia, Paraguay, Argentina
- T. sericeus (Simon, 1886) (type) — Brazil, Paraguay, Argentina, Chile
- T. singularis (Caporiacco, 1955) — Venezuela
- T. tarma Platnick, 1975 — Peru

== U ==
=== Utivarachna ===
Utivarachna Kishida, 1940

- U. accentuata (Simon, 1896) — Sri Lanka
- U. arcuata Zhao & Peng, 2014 — China
- U. bucculenta Deeleman-Reinhold, 2001 — Thailand
- U. chamaeleon Deeleman-Reinhold, 2001 — Borneo (Malaysia, Indonesia)
- U. dusun Deeleman-Reinhold, 2001 — Malaysia (Borneo)
- U. fabaria Zhao & Peng, 2014 — China
- U. fronto (Simon, 1906) — India
- U. fukasawana Kishida, 1940 (type) — Borneo (Malaysia, Brunei)
- U. gongshanensis Zhao & Peng, 2014 — China
- U. gui (Zhu, Song & Kim, 1998) — China
- U. ichneumon Deeleman-Reinhold, 2001 — Malaysia (Borneo)
- U. kinabaluensis Deeleman-Reinhold, 2001 — Malaysia (Borneo)
- U. lata Jin, Yin & Zhang, 2015 — China
- U. phyllicola Deeleman-Reinhold, 2001 — Thailand, Indonesia (Sumatra, Borneo)
- U. rama Chami-Kranon & Likhitrakarn, 2007 — Thailand
- U. rubra Deeleman-Reinhold, 2001 — Indonesia (Borneo)
- U. subfabaria Liu, Xu & Haddad, 2020 — China
- U. taiwanica (Hayashi & Yoshida, 1993) — Taiwan
- U. tangi Liu, Xu & Haddad, 2020 — China
