= Foordana =

Scientific classification
- Kingdom: Animalia
- Phylum: Arthropoda
- Subphylum: Chelicerata
- Class: Arachnida
- Order: Araneae
- Infraorder: Araneomorphae
- Family: Trachelidae
- Genus: Foordana; Haddad, 2025

Type species
- F. distincta Haddad, 2025

Species
- 3, see text

Genus of spiders

Foordana is a genus of spiders in the family Trachelidae.

== Distribution ==
Foordana is known from South Africa, where three species have been recorded. The genus appears to be endemic to South Africa based on current distributional data.

== Etymology ==
The genus name honors South African arachnologist Stefan Foord (1971–2023). F. distinta refers to the well-defined abdominal markings. F. flavipoda indicates the yellow legs in both sexes of this species. F. kasouga is named after Kasouga in the Eastern Cape Province, its type locality.

== Species ==
As of January 2026, this genus includes three species:

- Foordana distincta Haddad, 2025 – South Africa
- Foordana flavipoda Haddad, 2025 – South Africa
- Foordana kasouga Haddad, 2025 – South Africa
