= Coronarachne =

Scientific classification
- Kingdom: Animalia
- Phylum: Arthropoda
- Subphylum: Chelicerata
- Class: Arachnida
- Order: Araneae
- Infraorder: Araneomorphae
- Family: Trachelidae
- Genus: Coronarachne; Haddad & Lyle, 2024

Type species
- C. denticulata Haddad & Lyle, 2024

Species
- 5, see text

Genus of spiders

Coronarachne is a genus of spiders in the family Trachelidae.

== Distribution ==
Coronarachne is endemic to southern Africa.

== Etymology ==
The genus name is a combination of Latin "corona" (crown) and Ancient Greek αράχνη (arachne, "spider"), referring to the denticles at the distal end of the dorsal RTA that resemble a crown.

The species name for C. denticulata refers to the pronounced denticles on the distal end of the dorsal RTA of males. C. neethlingi honors Jan Andries Neethling, who collected the holotype. C. penicillus (from Latin penicillum "brush") is named for the shape of the embolus tip. C. setosa (from Latin "bristly") indicates tufts of setae on the cymbium. C. unigena ("sharing both parents") refers to the similarity of males of this species and C. setosa.

== Species ==
As of January 2026, this genus includes five species:

- Coronarachne denticulata Haddad & Lyle, 2024 – South Africa
- Coronarachne neethlingi Haddad & Lyle, 2024 – South Africa
- Coronarachne penicillus Haddad & Lyle, 2024 – South Africa
- Coronarachne setosa Haddad & Lyle, 2024 – Mozambique, South Africa
- Coronarachne unigena Haddad & Lyle, 2024 – South Africa
