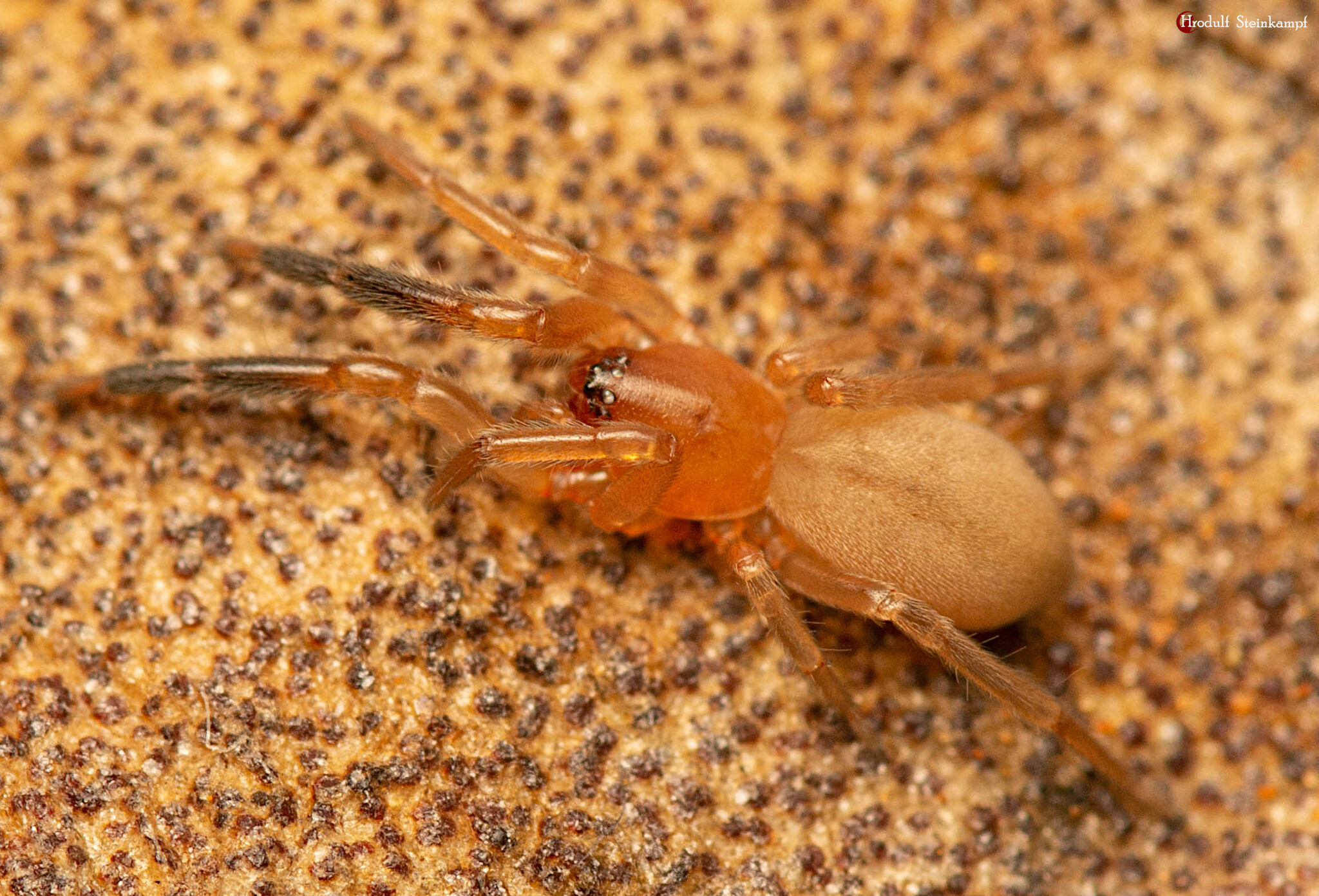
- R. gramineus

Scientific classification
- Kingdom: Animalia
- Phylum: Arthropoda
- Subphylum: Chelicerata
- Class: Arachnida
- Order: Araneae
- Infraorder: Araneomorphae
- Family: Trachelidae
- Genus: Rukuluk; Haddad, 2025
- Species: R. gramineus

Binomial name
- Rukuluk gramineus Haddad, 2025

= Rukuluk =

Species of spider

Rukuluk is a monotypic genus of spiders in the family Trachelidae containing the single species, Rukuluk gramineus.

== Distribution ==
Rukuluk gramineus is endemic to South Africa.

== Etymology ==
The species name is derived from Latin "gramineus" ("belonging to grass"), referring to the species' microhabitat.
