= Capobula =

Scientific classification
- Kingdom: Animalia
- Phylum: Arthropoda
- Subphylum: Chelicerata
- Class: Arachnida
- Order: Araneae
- Infraorder: Araneomorphae
- Family: Trachelidae
- Genus: Capobula; Haddad, Jin, Platnick & Booysen, 2021

Type species
- Orthobula infima (Simon, 1896)

Species
- 5, see text

Genus of spiders

Capobula is a genus of southern African spiders in the family Trachelidae. The type species was first described by Eugène Simon from a juvenile found in South Africa. It was placed with Orthobula for several morphological similarities, including a large sclerite beneath the abdomen and spines behind several of the legs. After a more thorough examination in 2021, including both male and female adults, enough distinctive features were found in the holotype and several other newly discovered species to warrant a new genus.

== Distribution ==
All described species are endemic to South Africa (with one also found in Lesotho).

== Species ==
As of October 2025, this genus includes five species:

- Capobula capensis Haddad, Jin, Platnick & Booysen, 2021 – South Africa
- Capobula infima (Simon, 1896) – South Africa (type species)
- Capobula montana Haddad, Jin, Platnick & Booysen, 2021 – South Africa, Lesotho
- Capobula neethlingi Haddad, Jin, Platnick & Booysen, 2021 – South Africa
- Capobula ukhahlamba Haddad, Jin, Platnick & Booysen, 2021 – South Africa

== See also ==
- Orthobula
