= Mushimane =

Scientific classification
- Kingdom: Animalia
- Phylum: Arthropoda
- Subphylum: Chelicerata
- Class: Arachnida
- Order: Araneae
- Infraorder: Araneomorphae
- Family: Trachelidae
- Genus: Mushimane; Haddad, 2025
- Species: M. tswibilinki

Binomial name
- Mushimane tswibilinki Haddad, 2025

Genus of spider

Mushimane is a South African monotypic genus of spiders in the family Trachelidae containing the single species, Mushimane tswibilinki.

== Description ==
Adults are only about 1.8 mm in body length.

== Etymology ==
The genus name is a Swahili word for "little man", indicating this being possibly the smallest species of the family. "tswibilinki" indicates a man with a small penis in the Sesotho language, in reference to the short embolus in males of this species.
