= Namaquella =

Scientific classification
- Kingdom: Animalia
- Phylum: Arthropoda
- Subphylum: Chelicerata
- Class: Arachnida
- Order: Araneae
- Infraorder: Araneomorphae
- Family: Trachelidae
- Genus: Namaquella; Haddad, 2025

Type species
- N. arida Haddad, 2025

Species
- 2, see text

Genus of spiders

Namaquella is a genus of spiders in the family Trachelidae.

== Distribution ==
Namaquella is endemic to South Africa.

== Etymology ==
The genus is named after the Namaqualand region where the type species originates. N. arida indicates the species was collected from arid Succulent Karoo environments. N. samanthae is named after Charles Haddad's wife, who collected the holotype of this species.

== Species ==
As of January 2026, this genus includes two species:

- Namaquella arida Haddad, 2025 – South Africa
- Namaquella samanthae Haddad, 2025 – South Africa
