= Mondeku =

Scientific classification
- Kingdom: Animalia
- Phylum: Arthropoda
- Subphylum: Chelicerata
- Class: Arachnida
- Order: Araneae
- Infraorder: Araneomorphae
- Family: Salticidae
- Genus: Mondeku; Azarkina & Haddad, 2020
- Species: M. albopilosum

Binomial name
- Mondeku albopilosum Azarkina & Haddad, 2020

Genus of jumping spiders

Mondeku is a monotypic genus of east African jumping spiders containing the single species, Mondeku albopilosum. It was first described by G. N. Azarkina and C. R. Haddad in 2020, and it has only been found in Kenya.

== See also ==
- List of Salticidae genera
