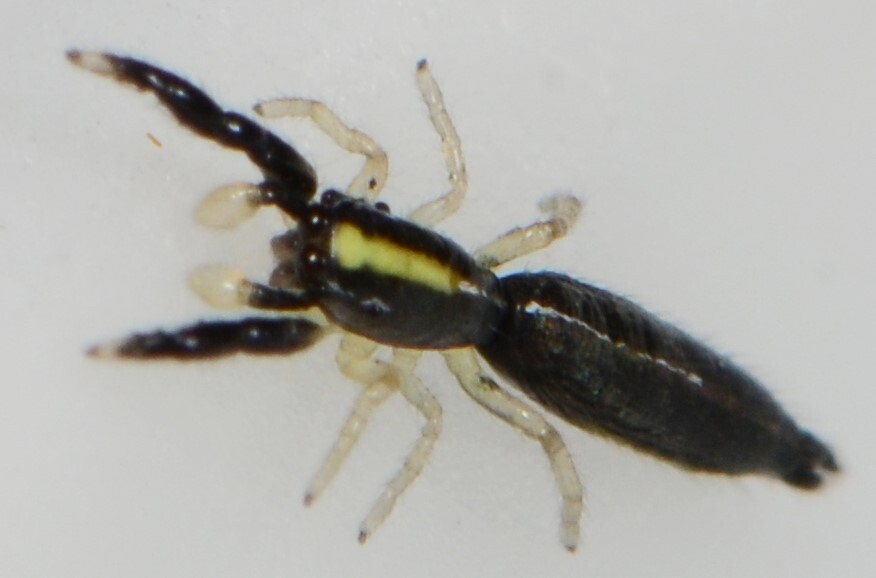
- female T. coronatus
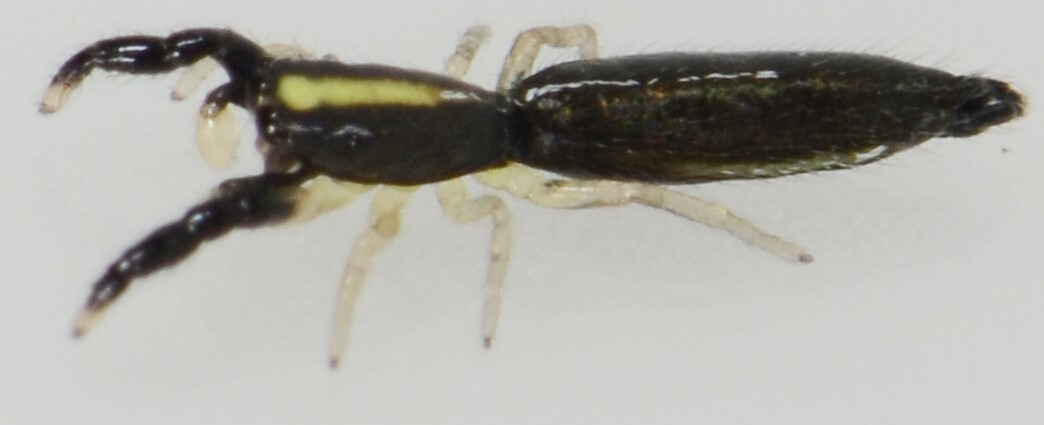
- female T. coronatus

Scientific classification
- Kingdom: Animalia
- Phylum: Arthropoda
- Subphylum: Chelicerata
- Class: Arachnida
- Order: Araneae
- Infraorder: Araneomorphae
- Family: Salticidae
- Genus: Tenuiballus; Azarkina & Haddad, 2020

Type species
- T. minor Azarkina & Haddad, 2020

Species
- Tenuiballus coronatus Azarkina & Haddad, 2020; Tenuiballus minor Azarkina & Haddad, 2020

= Tenuiballus =

Genus of jumping spiders

Tenuiballus is a small genus of southern African jumping spiders. It was first described by G. N. Azarkina and C. R. Haddad in 2020, and it has only been found in South Africa.

== Species ==
As of October 2025, this genus includes two species:

- Tenuiballus coronatus Azarkina & Haddad, 2020 – South Africa
- Tenuiballus minor Azarkina & Haddad, 2020 – South Africa (type species)

== See also ==
- List of Salticidae genera
