= Trachecymbius =

Scientific classification
- Kingdom: Animalia
- Phylum: Arthropoda
- Subphylum: Chelicerata
- Class: Arachnida
- Order: Araneae
- Infraorder: Araneomorphae
- Family: Trachelidae
- Genus: Trachecymbius; Haddad & Lyle, 2024

Type species
- T. tyume Haddad & Lyle, 2024

Species
- 5, see text

Genus of spiders

Trachecymbius is a genus of spiders in the family Trachelidae.

== Distribution ==
Trachecymbius is endemic to South Africa.

== Etymology ==
The genus name is a contraction of the related genus Trachelas and "cymbium".

T. bosselaersi honors Belgian arachnologist Jan Bosselaers. T. felis (from Latin for "cat") refers to Katberg ("cat mountain"), the type locality. T. peterwebbi honors Peter Webb for his sampling and photography contributions. T. tyume indicates that this species was first discovered in Tyume Forest. T. umbella (Latin for "sun-shade") refers to the shape of the epigynal anterior ridges.

== Species ==
As of January 2026, this genus includes five species:

- Trachecymbius bosselaersi Haddad & Lyle, 2024 – South Africa
- Trachecymbius felis Haddad & Lyle, 2024 – South Africa
- Trachecymbius peterwebbi Haddad & Lyle, 2024 – South Africa
- Trachecymbius tyume Haddad & Lyle, 2024 – South Africa
- Trachecymbius umbella Haddad & Lyle, 2024 – South Africa
