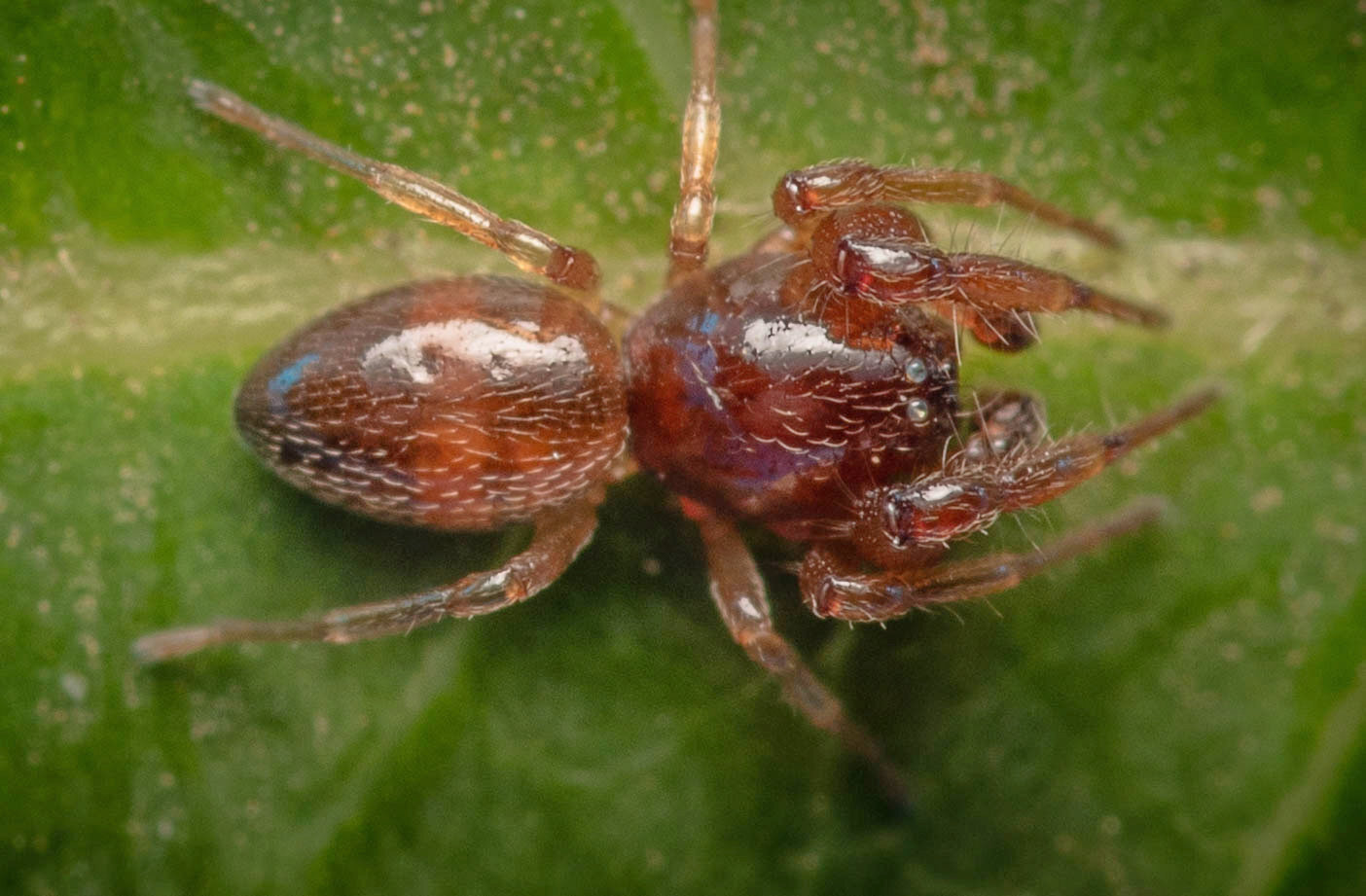
- F. gladius in South Africa

Scientific classification
- Kingdom: Animalia
- Phylum: Arthropoda
- Subphylum: Chelicerata
- Class: Arachnida
- Order: Araneae
- Infraorder: Araneomorphae
- Family: Trachelidae
- Genus: Falcaranea; Haddad & Lyle, 2024

Type species
- F. gladius Haddad & Lyle, 2024

Species
- 3, see text

= Falcaranea =

Genus of spiders

Falcaranea is a genus of spiders in the family Trachelidae.

== Distribution ==
Falcaranea is endemic to southern Africa.

== Etymology ==
The genus name is a combination of Latin "falcatus" "armed with scythes" and Ancient Greek "spider", referring to the sword-like shape of the male embolus. F. amatola is named after the Amatola Mountains, where most specimens were collected. F. gladius also refers to the embolus shape, from Latin "sword". F. maputensis is named after Maputaland, where it was collected.

== Species ==
As of January 2026, this genus includes three species:

- Falcaranea amatola Haddad & Lyle, 2024 – South Africa
- Falcaranea gladius Haddad & Lyle, 2024 – South Africa
- Falcaranea maputensis Haddad & Lyle, 2024 – Zimbabwe, Mozambique, South Africa
