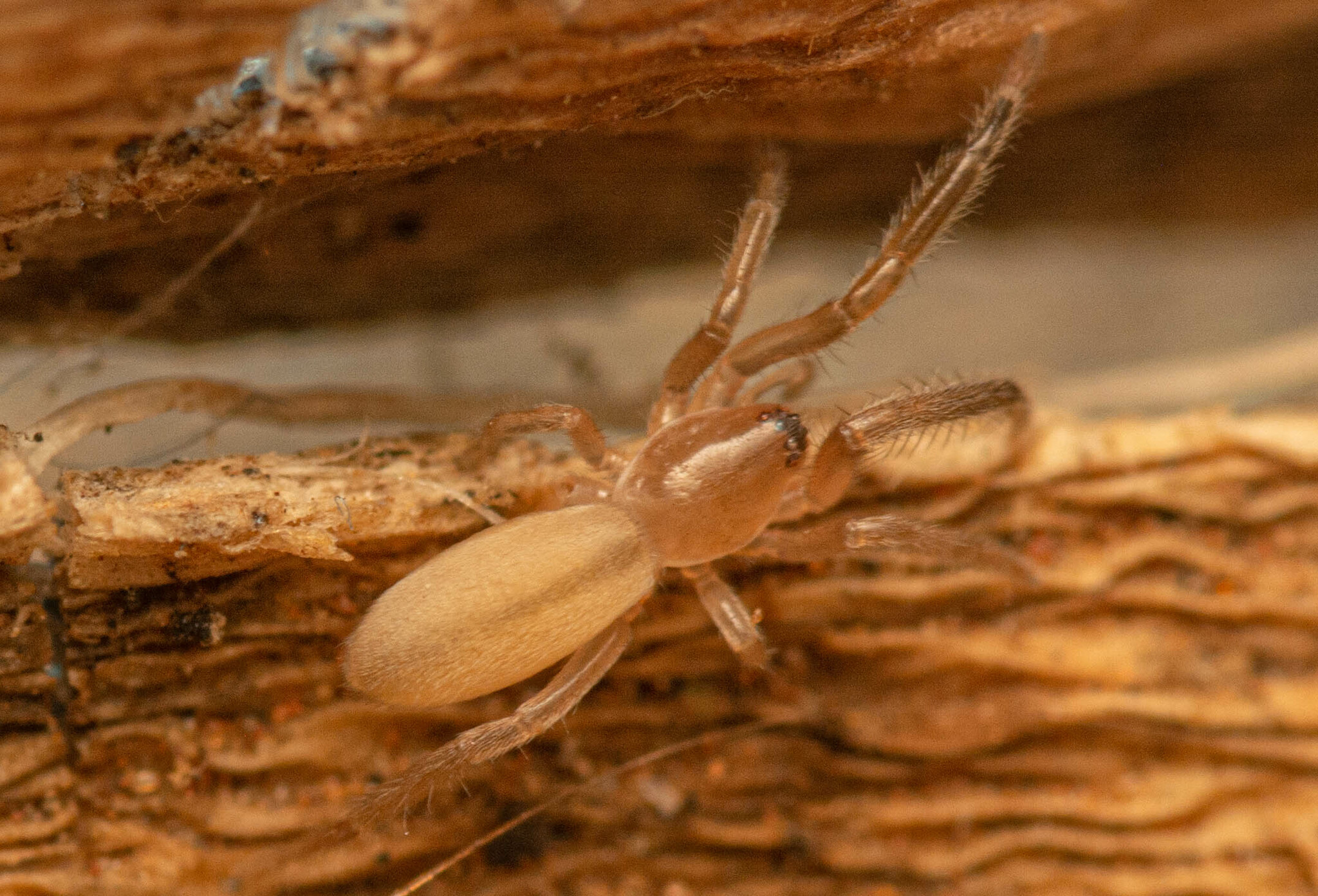
- P. striatus
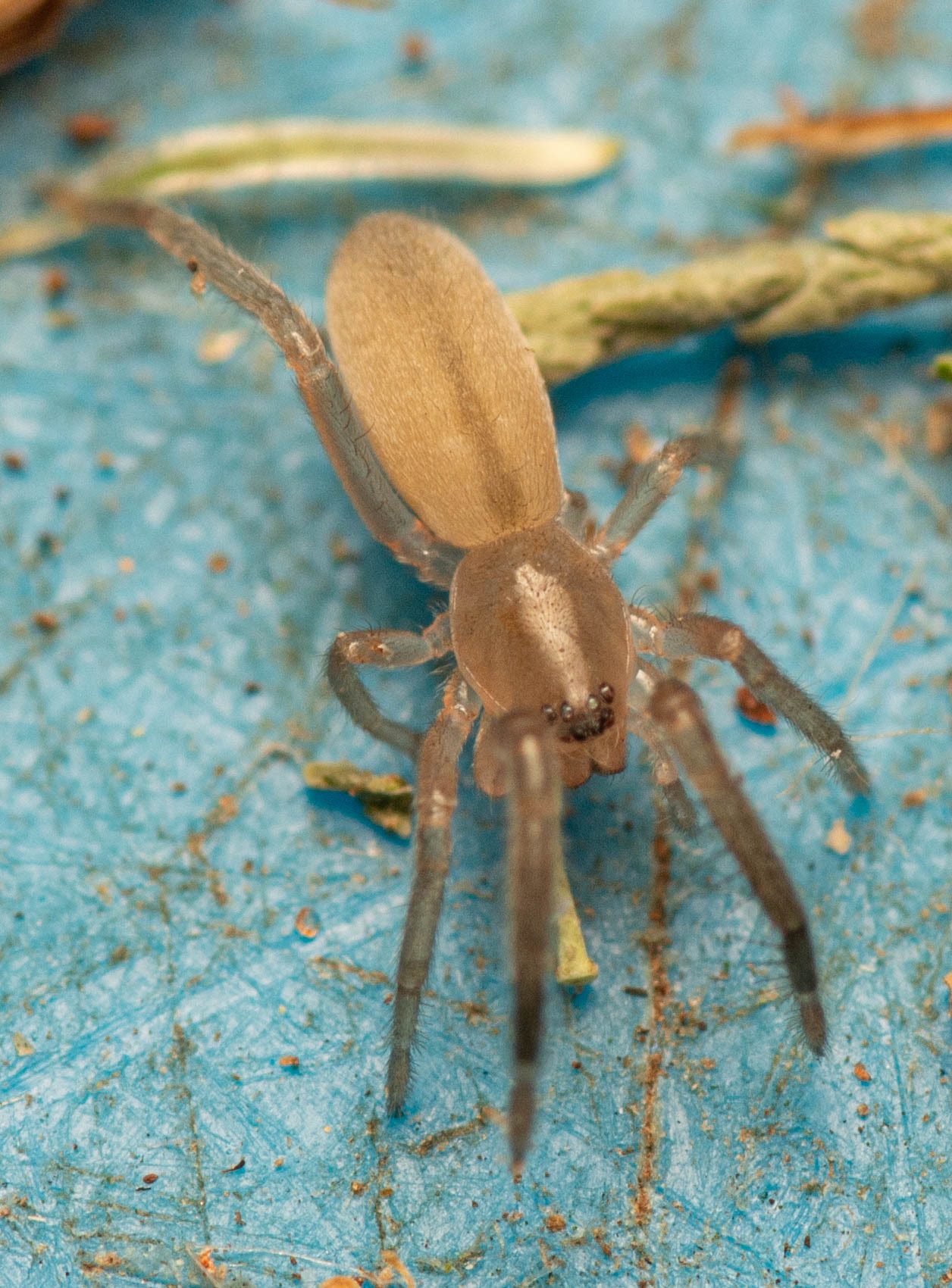
- P. striatus

Scientific classification
- Kingdom: Animalia
- Phylum: Arthropoda
- Subphylum: Chelicerata
- Class: Arachnida
- Order: Araneae
- Infraorder: Araneomorphae
- Family: Trachelidae
- Genus: Poachelas; Haddad & Lyle, 2008

Type species
- P. striatus Haddad & Lyle, 2008

Species
- 4, see text

= Poachelas =

Genus of spiders

Poachelas is a genus of African araneomorph spiders in the family Trachelidae, first described by Charles R. Haddad & R. Lyle in 2008.

Three of its species are endemic to South Africa, one is endemic to Zimbabwe.

== Species ==
As of October 2025, this genus includes four species:

- Poachelas montanus Haddad & Lyle, 2008 – South Africa
- Poachelas refugus Haddad, 2010 – South Africa
- Poachelas solitarius Haddad & Lyle, 2008 – Zimbabwe
- Poachelas striatus Haddad & Lyle, 2008 – South Africa (type species)
