= Spinotrachelas =

Scientific classification
- Kingdom: Animalia
- Phylum: Arthropoda
- Subphylum: Chelicerata
- Class: Arachnida
- Order: Araneae
- Infraorder: Araneomorphae
- Family: Trachelidae
- Genus: Spinotrachelas; Haddad, 2006

Type species
- S. capensis Haddad, 2006

Species
- 5, see text

Genus of spiders

Spinotrachelas is a genus of South African araneomorph spiders in the family Trachelidae, first described by Charles R. Haddad in 2006.

All of its described species are endemic to South Africa.

== Species ==
As of October 2025, this genus includes five species:

- Spinotrachelas capensis Haddad, 2006 – South Africa (type species)
- Spinotrachelas confinis Lyle, 2011 – South Africa
- Spinotrachelas montanus Haddad, Neethling & Lyle, 2011 – South Africa
- Spinotrachelas namaquensis Lyle, 2011 – South Africa
- Spinotrachelas similis Lyle, 2011 – South Africa
