= Fuchibotulus =

Scientific classification
- Kingdom: Animalia
- Phylum: Arthropoda
- Subphylum: Chelicerata
- Class: Arachnida
- Order: Araneae
- Infraorder: Araneomorphae
- Family: Trachelidae
- Genus: Fuchibotulus; Haddad & Lyle, 2008

Type species
- F. bicornis Haddad & Lyle, 2008

Species
- F. bicornis Haddad & Lyle, 2008; F. haddadi Lyle, 2013; F. kigelia Haddad & Lyle, 2008

Genus of spiders

Fuchibotulus is a genus of South African and Mozambican araneomorph spiders in the family Trachelidae, first described by Charles R. Haddad & R. Lyle in 2008.

== Species ==
As of October 2025, this genus includes three species:

- Fuchibotulus bicornis Haddad & Lyle, 2008 – South Africa (type species)
- Fuchibotulus haddadi Lyle, 2013 – South Africa
- Fuchibotulus kigelia Haddad & Lyle, 2008 – South Africa, Mozambique
