= Corniclypeus =

Scientific classification
- Kingdom: Animalia
- Phylum: Arthropoda
- Subphylum: Chelicerata
- Class: Arachnida
- Order: Araneae
- Infraorder: Araneomorphae
- Family: Trachelidae
- Genus: Corniclypeus; Jin, Li & Zhang, 2024
- Species: C. simplex

Binomial name
- Corniclypeus simplex (Jin, Li & Zhang, 2024)

Species of spider

Corniclypeus is a monotypic genus of spiders in the family Trachelidae containing the single species, Corniclypeus simplex.

This genus was originally named Cornifronus, then corrected to Cornifrons, which was already taken by a moth genus.

== Etymology ==
The genus name is a combination of Latin "corniger" (horned) and "clypeus".

== Distribution ==
Corniclypeus simplex is endemic to China.
