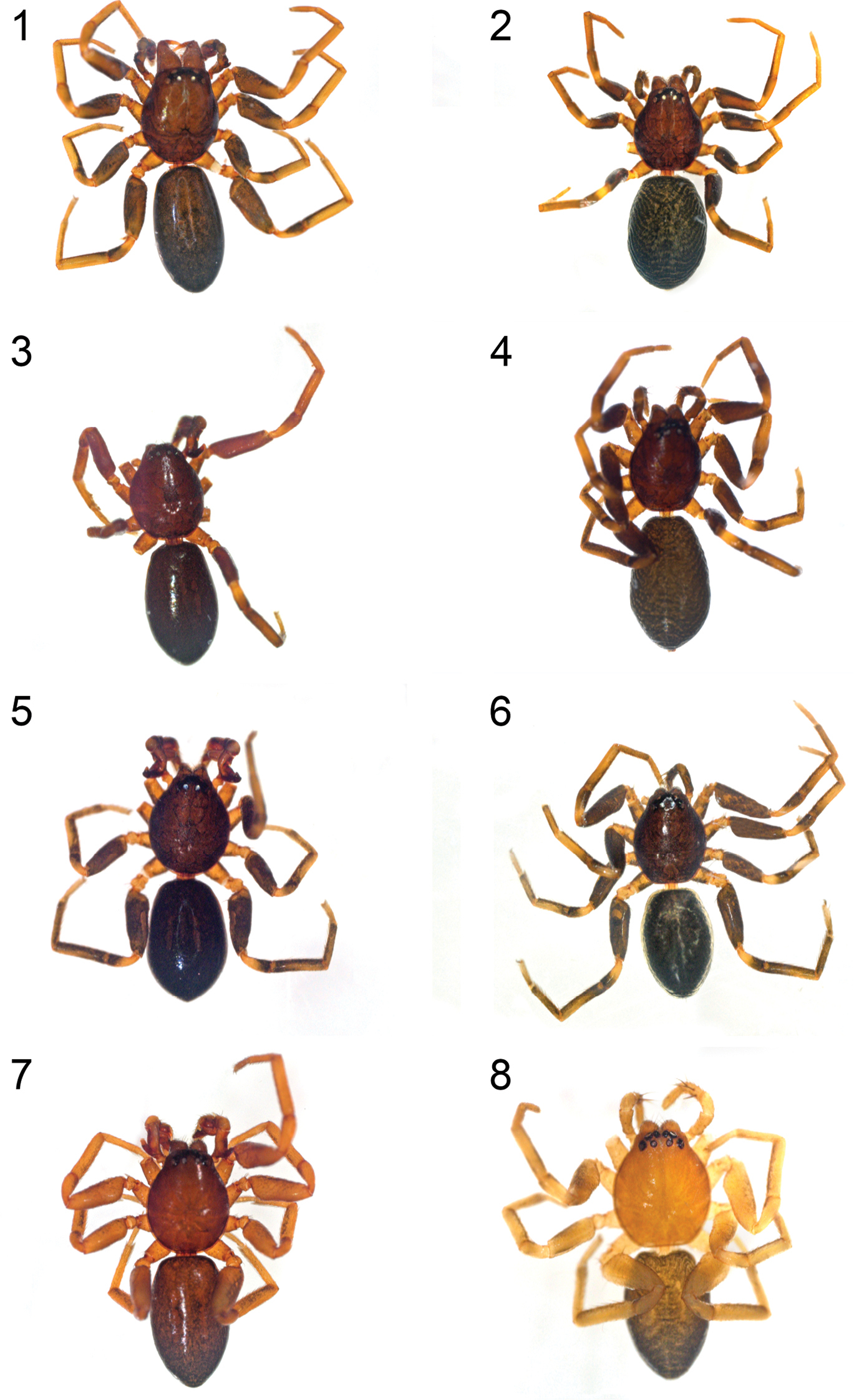
- Planochelas brevis, Planochelas haddadi, Planochelas jocquei, and Planochelas neethlingi

Scientific classification
- Kingdom: Animalia
- Phylum: Arthropoda
- Subphylum: Chelicerata
- Class: Arachnida
- Order: Araneae
- Infraorder: Araneomorphae
- Family: Trachelidae
- Genus: Planochelas; Lyle & Haddad, 2009

Type species
- P. botulus Lyle & Haddad, 2009

Species
- see text

= Planochelas =

Genus of spiders

Planochelas is an African genus of African araneomorph spiders in the family Trachelidae, first described by R. Lyle & C. R. Haddad in 2009.

== Species ==
As of October 2025, this genus includes seven species:

- Planochelas botulus Lyle & Haddad, 2009 – Ghana, Uganda (type species)
- Planochelas brevis Khoza & Lyle, 2019 – DR Congo
- Planochelas dentatus Lyle & Haddad, 2009 – Ivory Coast
- Planochelas haddadi Khoza & Lyle, 2019 – South Africa
- Planochelas jocquei Khoza & Lyle, 2019 – DR Congo
- Planochelas neethlingi Khoza & Lyle, 2019 – South Africa
- Planochelas purpureus Lyle & Haddad, 2009 – Ivory Coast
