= Patelloceto =

Scientific classification
- Kingdom: Animalia
- Phylum: Arthropoda
- Subphylum: Chelicerata
- Class: Arachnida
- Order: Araneae
- Infraorder: Araneomorphae
- Family: Trachelidae
- Genus: Patelloceto; Lyle & Haddad, 2010

Type species
- P. secutor Lyle & Haddad, 2010

Species
- see text

Genus of spiders

Patelloceto is a genus of African araneomorph spiders in the family Trachelidae, first described by R. Lyle & C. R. Haddad in 2010.

== Species ==
As of October 2025, this genus includes five species:

- Patelloceto denticulata Lyle & Haddad, 2010 – Ethiopia
- Patelloceto media Lyle & Haddad, 2010 – Central, East Africa
- Patelloceto murphyorum Pett, 2022 – Kenya
- Patelloceto secutor Lyle & Haddad, 2010 – Southern Africa (type species)
- Patelloceto thomasi Pett, 2022 – Kenya
