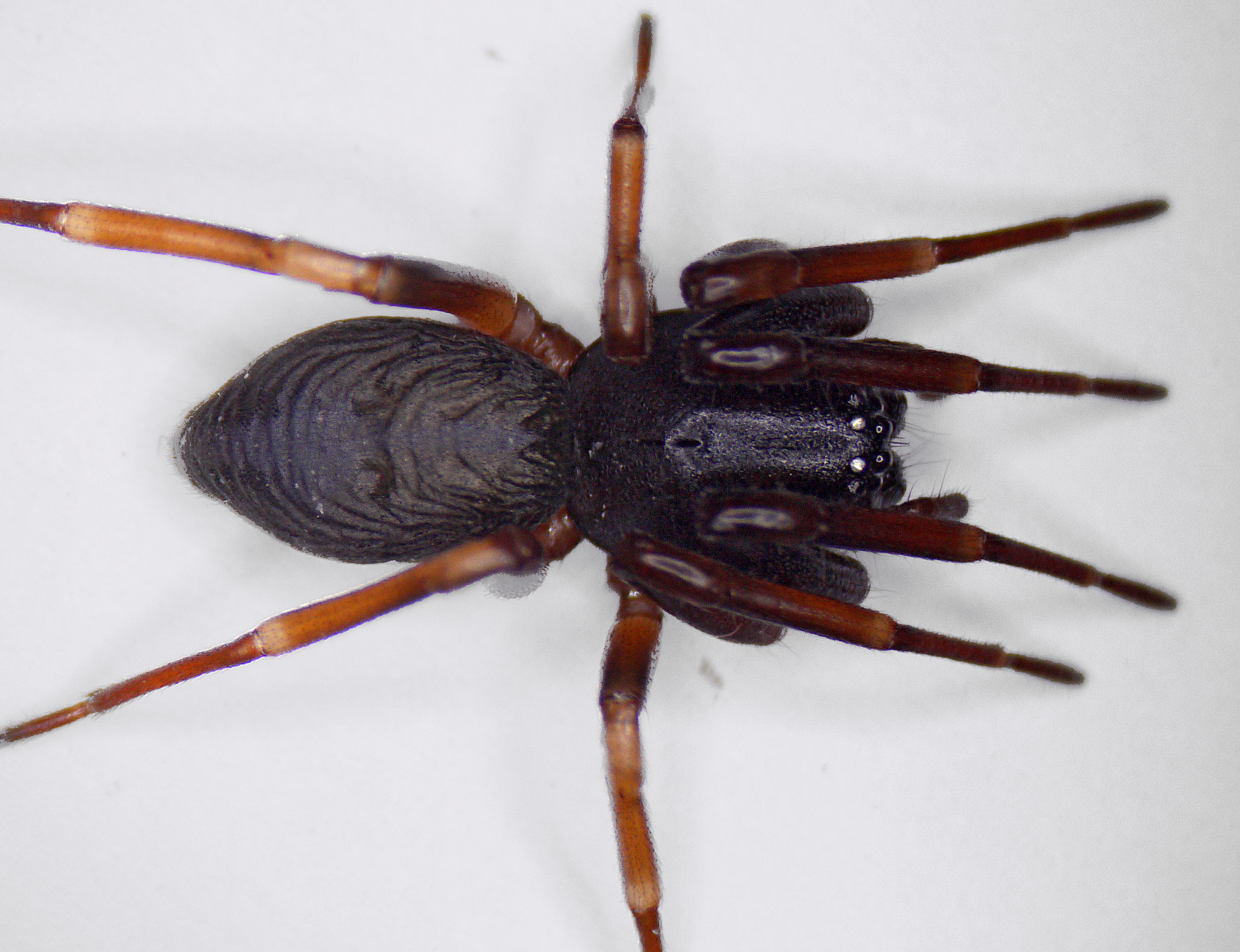
- Cetonana laticeps
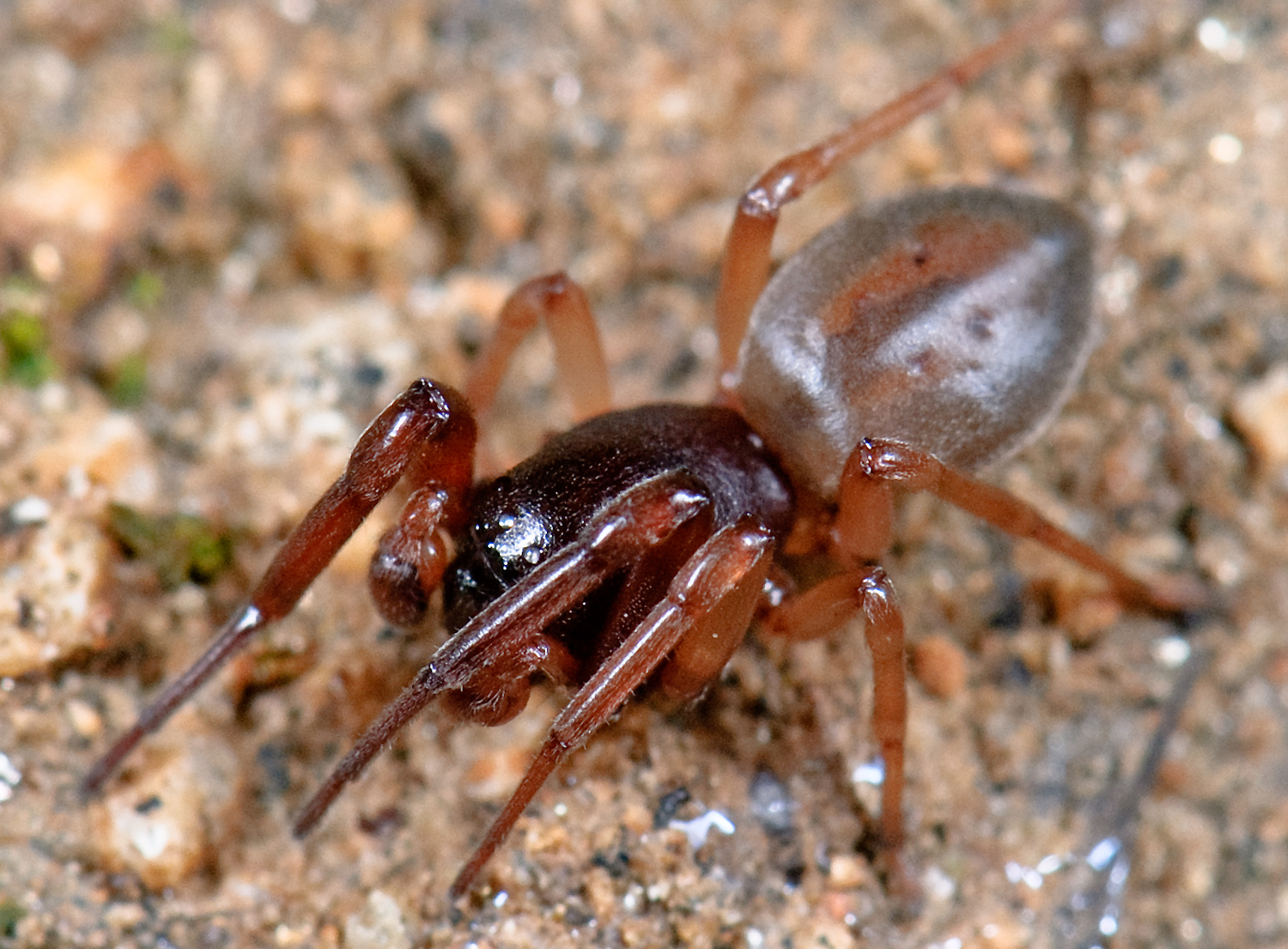
- male Trachelas pacificus

Scientific classification
- Kingdom: Animalia
- Phylum: Arthropoda
- Subphylum: Chelicerata
- Class: Arachnida
- Order: Araneae
- Infraorder: Araneomorphae
- Family: Trachelidae; Simon, 1897

Diversity
- 29 genera, 307 species
- blue: reported countries (WSC) green: observation hotspots (iNaturalist)

= Trachelidae =

Trachelidae Temporal range: Neogene–present

Family of spiders

Trachelidae is a family of araneomorph spiders (more recently evolved spiders with inward-pointing chelicerae) first described by Eugène Simon in 1897 as a subfamily called "Tracheleae" ("Trachelinae" in modern terminology).

The Trachelidae family, also known as "ground sac spiders", is within the group of spiders known as the RTA clade, which includes mostly wandering spiders that do not use webs. Spiders in the Trachelidae family are characterized as being 3-10mm long and having a red cephalothorax and a yellow/tan abdomen. They are commonly found indoors. It was placed in the family Clubionidae, then later in Corinnidae when the Clubionidae were split up. The first study that suggested Trachelidae should be considered its own family was done by Deeleman-Reinhold in 2001 as part of an analysis of RTA Clade spiders.

An analysis by Martín J. Ramírez in 2014 suggested that it was not closely related to other members of the Corinnidae, and was better treated as a separate family. It was then placed in the CTC clade of spiders, or the Claw Tuft Clasper clade, which is a group of spiders that have two tarsal claws with tufts of hair.

A major synapomorphy of Trachelidae is the reduction of leg spines. Other synapomorphies of the family include no scales, no epiandrous spigot, only one major ampullate gland in females, no median apophysis, and the secondary spermatheca are the same size as the primary.

== Genera ==
As of January 2026, this family includes 29 genera and 307 species:

- Afroceto Lyle & Haddad, 2010 – Africa
- Capobula Haddad, Jin, Platnick & Booysen, 2021 – Lesotho, South Africa
- Cetonana Strand, 1929 – China, Caucasus, Turkey, Brazil
- Corniclypeus Jin, Li & Zhang, 2024 – China
- Coronarachne Haddad & Lyle, 2024 – Mozambique, South Africa
- Falcaranea Haddad & Lyle, 2024 – Mozambique, South Africa, Zimbabwe
- Foordana Haddad, 2025 – South Africa
- Fuchiba Haddad & Lyle, 2008 – Mozambique, Botswana, Lesotho, South Africa
- Fuchibotulus Haddad & Lyle, 2008 – Mozambique, South Africa
- Jocquestus Lyle & Haddad, 2018 – DR Congo, Mozambique, Tanzania, South Africa, Zimbabwe
- Meriola Banks, 1895 – Guatemala, North America, South America. Introduced to Hawaii
- Metatrachelas Bosselaers & Bosmans, 2010 – Algeria, Tunisia, Europe
- Mushimane Haddad, 2025 – South Africa
- Namaquella Haddad, 2025 – South Africa
- Orthobula Simon, 1897 – Africa, Asia, Argentina, Paraguay, Eastern Mediterranean
- Paccius Simon, 1898 – Madagascar, Seychelles
- Paraceto Jin, Yin & Zhang, 2017 – China, Korea
- Paranita Ramírez & Grismado, 2024 – Argentina
- Paratrachelas Kovblyuk & Nadolny, 2009 – Algeria, China, Korea, Israel, Turkey, Russia, Italy, Portugal, Spain, France
- Patelloceto Lyle & Haddad, 2010 – Africa
- Planochelas Lyle & Haddad, 2009 – DR Congo, Uganda, South Africa, Ghana, Ivory Coast
- Poachelas Haddad & Lyle, 2008 – South Africa, Zimbabwe
- Rukuluk Haddad, 2025 – South Afrika
- Spinotrachelas Haddad, 2006 – South Africa
- Thysanina Simon, 1910 – Tanzania, Namibia, South Africa
- Trachecymbius Haddad & Lyle, 2024 – South Africa
- Trachelas L. Koch, 1872 – Africa, Asia, Canary Islands, Russia, Spain, North America, South America
- Trachelopachys Simon, 1897 – South America
- Utivarachna Kishida, 1940 – Asia
