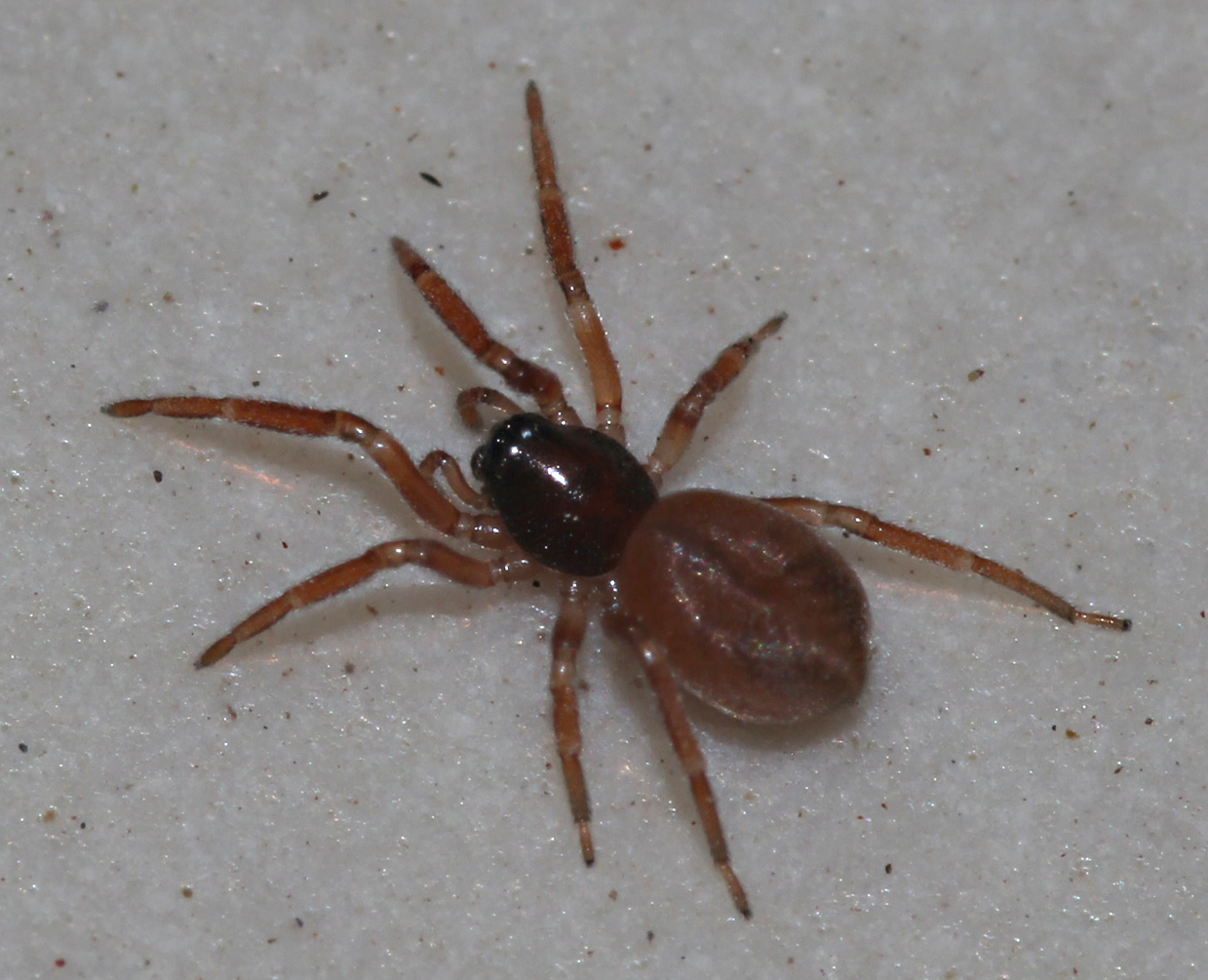
- P. paulae

Scientific classification
- Kingdom: Animalia
- Phylum: Arthropoda
- Subphylum: Chelicerata
- Class: Arachnida
- Order: Araneae
- Infraorder: Araneomorphae
- Family: Trachelidae
- Genus: Paranita; Ramírez & Grismado, 2024

Type species
- P. paulae Ramírez & Grismado, 2024

Species
- 2, see text

= Paranita =

Genus of spiders

Paranita is a genus of spiders in the family Trachelidae.

== Distribution ==
Paranita is endemic to Argentina.

== Etymology ==
The genus name indicates the region of the Paraná River. P. paulae is named after Paula Magariños, Martin Ramírez' wife. P. inesae is named after his daughter, Inés Ramírez Magariños.

== Species ==
As of January 2026, this genus includes two species:

- Paranita inesae Ramírez & Grismado, 2024 – Argentina
- Paranita paulae Ramírez & Grismado, 2024 – Argentina
