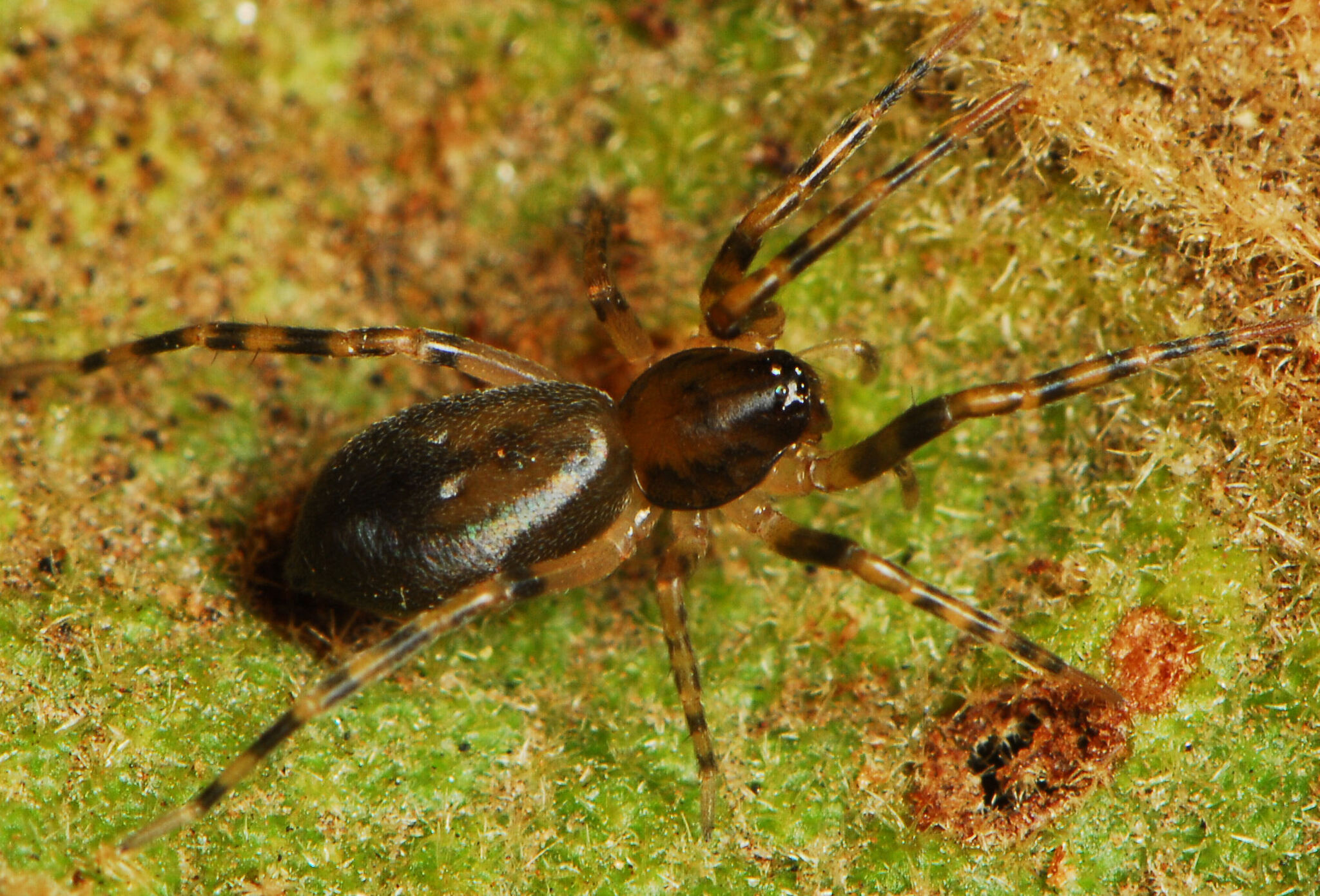
- female A. martini
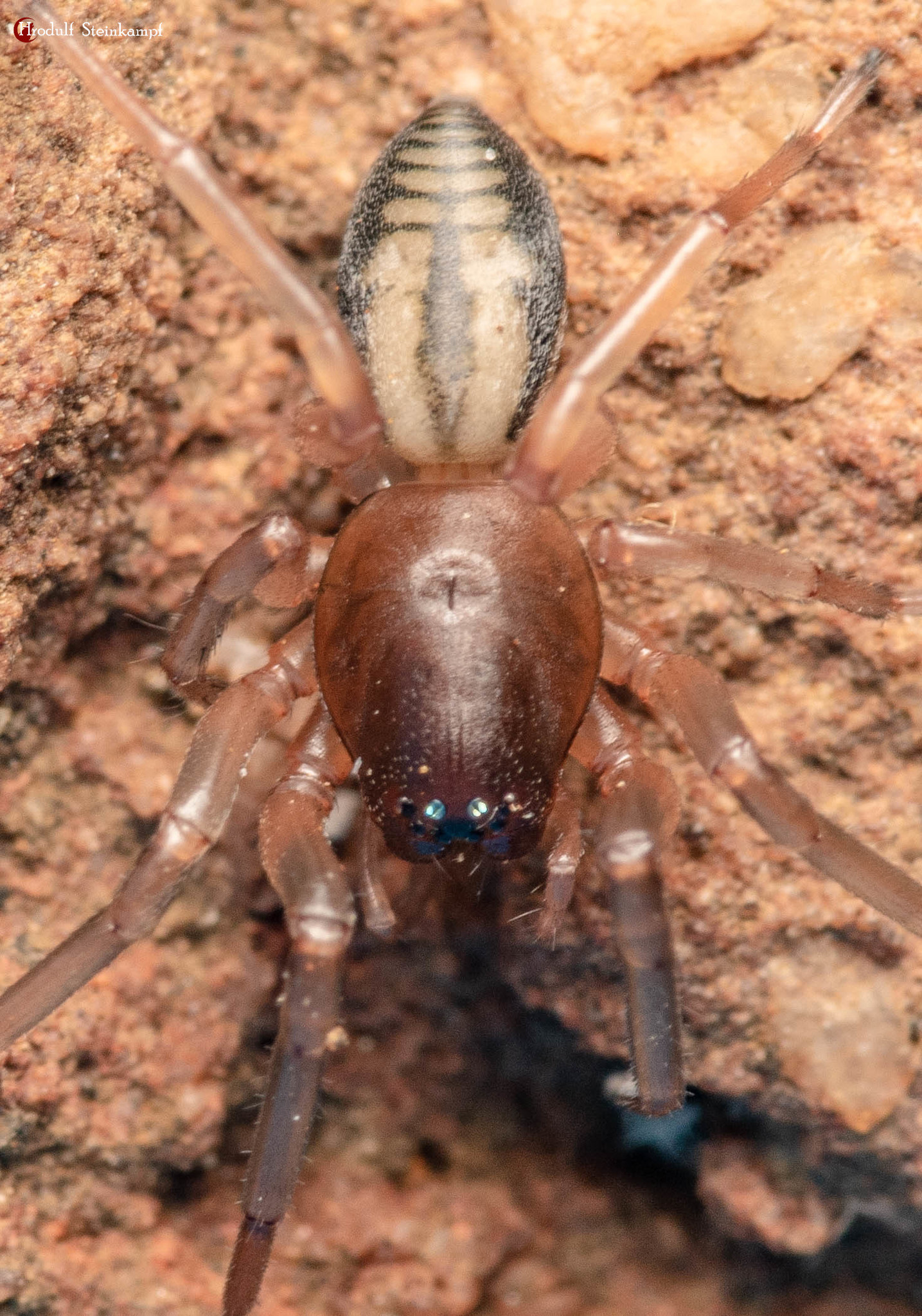
- A. africana

Scientific classification
- Kingdom: Animalia
- Phylum: Arthropoda
- Subphylum: Chelicerata
- Class: Arachnida
- Order: Araneae
- Infraorder: Araneomorphae
- Family: Trachelidae
- Genus: Afroceto; Lyle & Haddad, 2010

Type species
- A. martini (Simon, 1897)

Species
- 16, see text

= Afroceto =

Genus of spiders

Afroceto is a genus of African araneomorph spiders in the family Trachelidae, first described by R. Lyle & Charles R. Haddad in 2010.

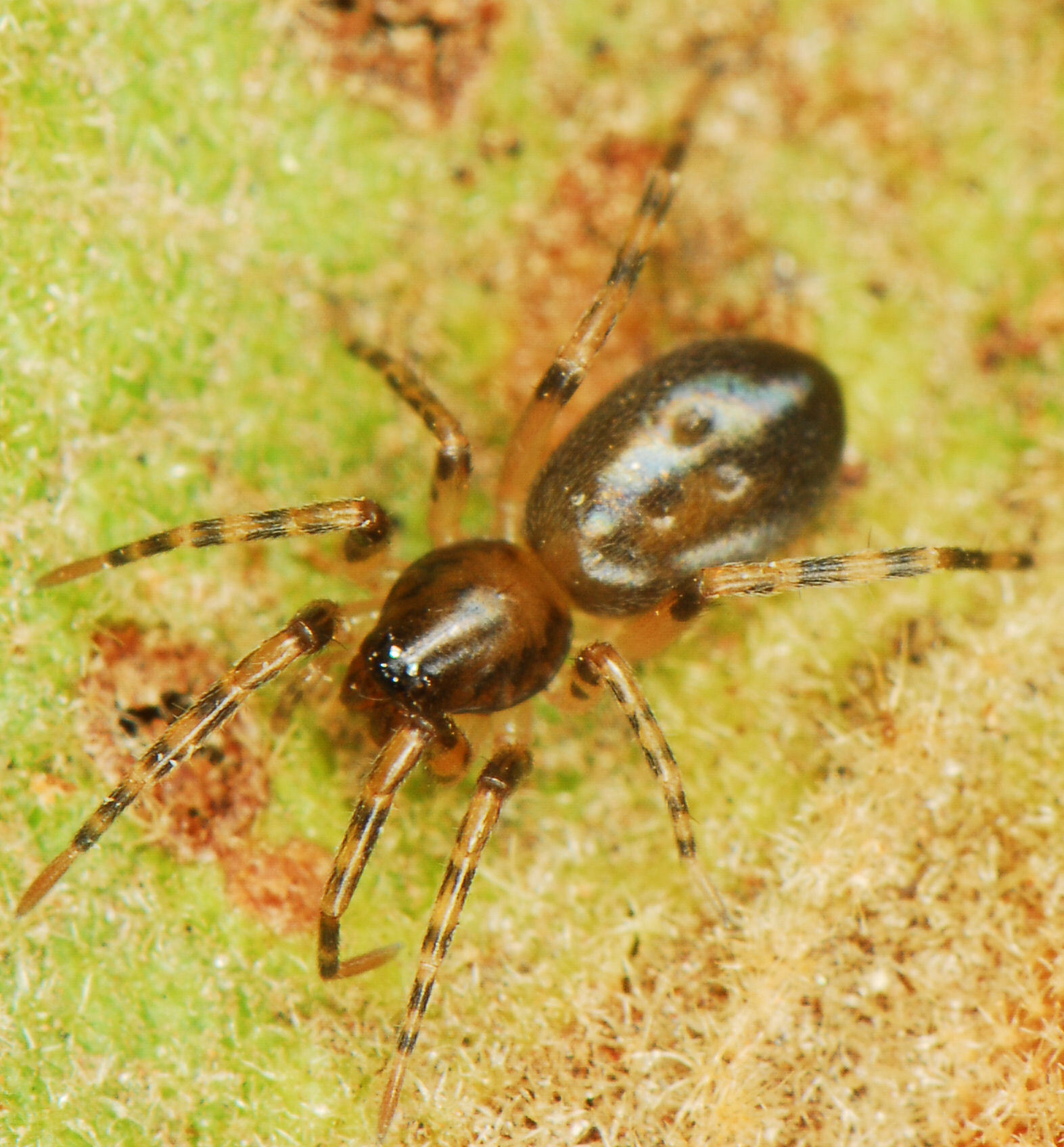
female A. martini

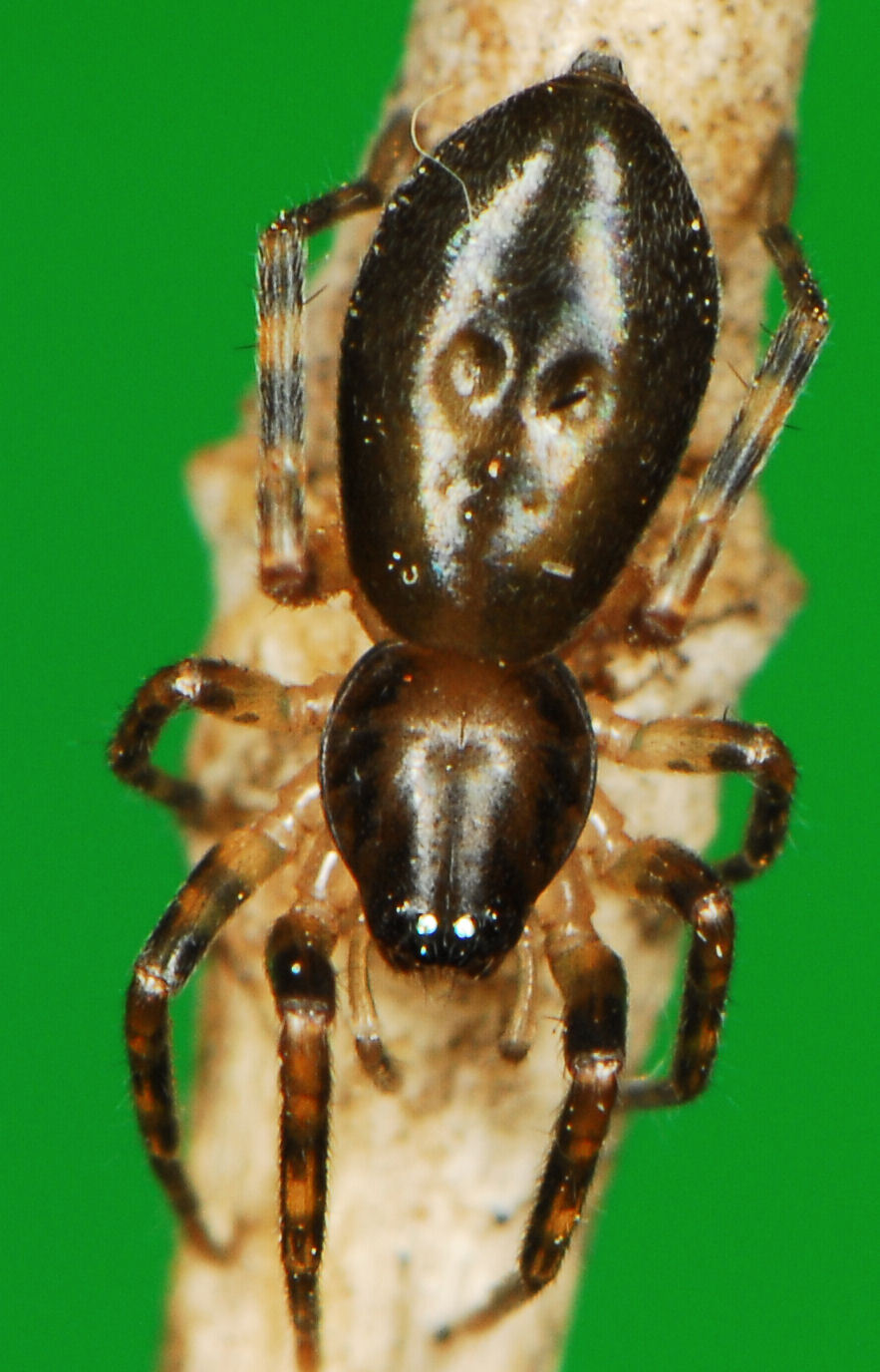
female A. martini

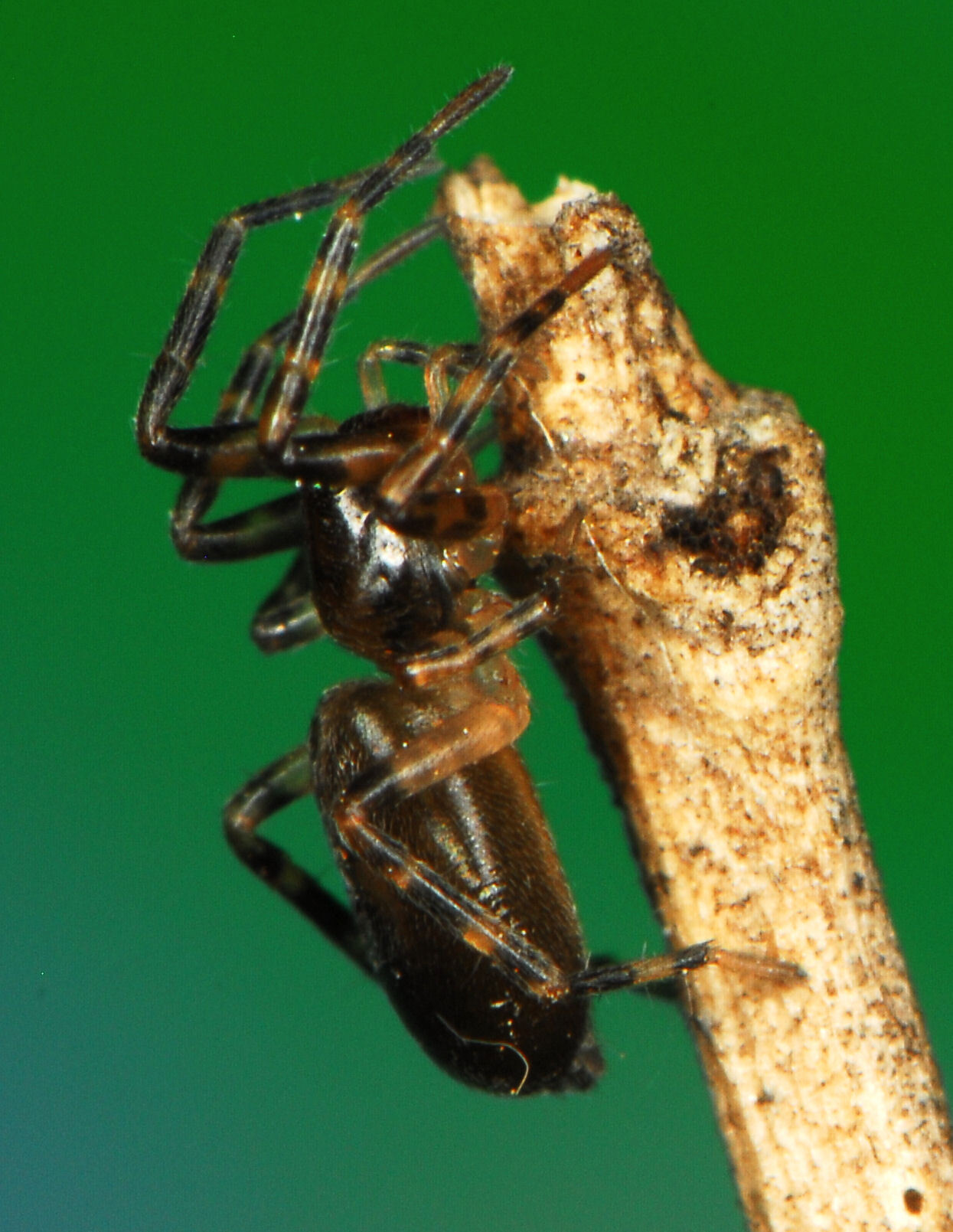
female A. martini

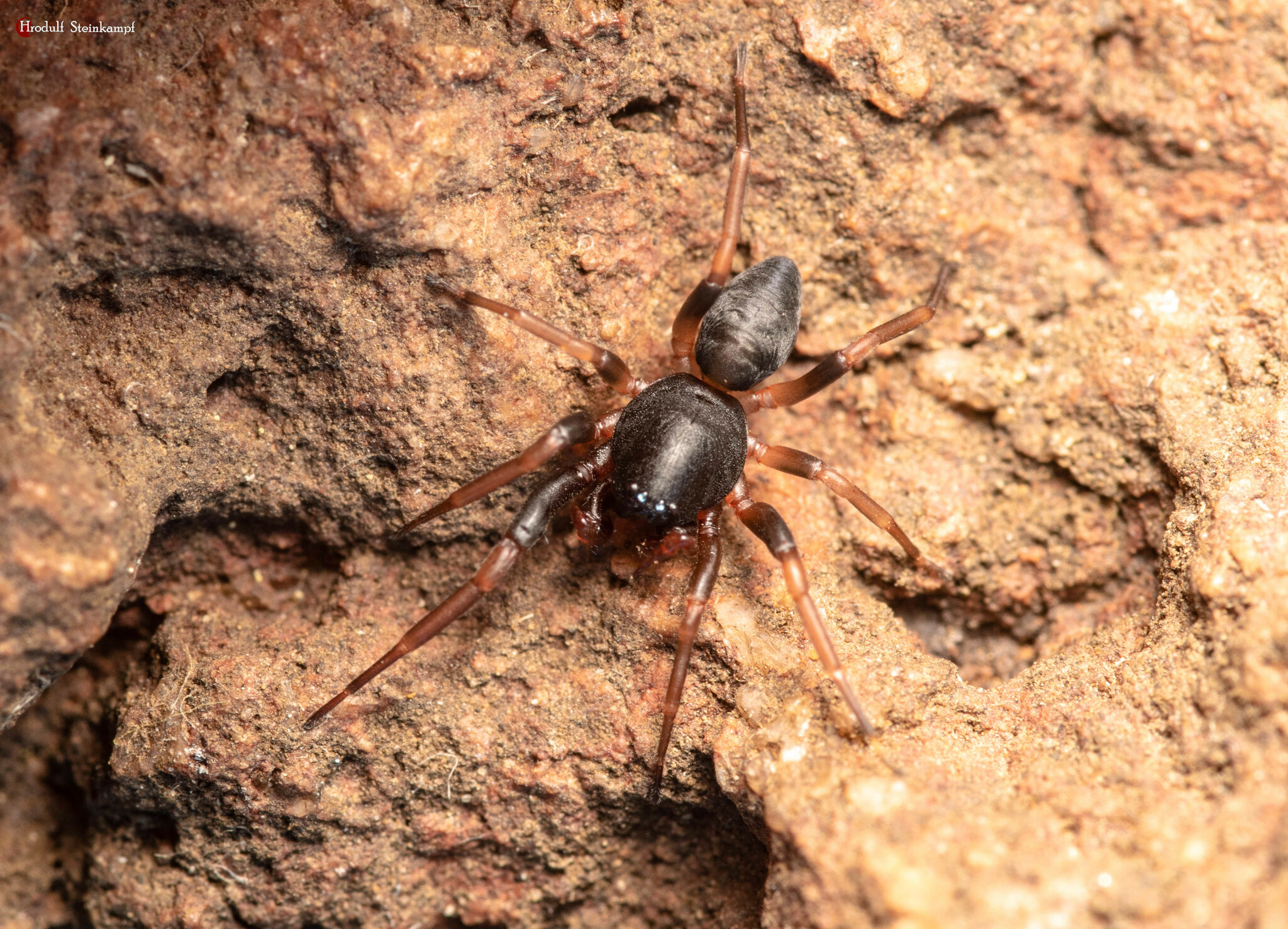
A. plana

== Species ==
As of October 2025, this genus includes sixteen species:

- Afroceto africana (Simon, 1910) – Namibia, South Africa, Lesotho
- Afroceto ansieae Lyle, 2015 – South Africa
- Afroceto bisulca Lyle & Haddad, 2010 – South Africa
- Afroceto bulla Lyle & Haddad, 2010 – South Africa
- Afroceto capensis Lyle & Haddad, 2010 – South Africa
- Afroceto coenosa (Simon, 1897) – South Africa
- Afroceto corcula Lyle & Haddad, 2010 – South Africa
- Afroceto croeseri Lyle & Haddad, 2010 – South Africa
- Afroceto dippenaarae Lyle, 2015 – South Africa
- Afroceto flabella Lyle & Haddad, 2010 – South Africa
- Afroceto gracilis Lyle & Haddad, 2010 – South Africa
- Afroceto martini (Simon, 1897) – East, Southern Africa (type species)
- Afroceto plana Lyle & Haddad, 2010 – South Africa, Malawi
- Afroceto porrecta Lyle & Haddad, 2010 – South Africa
- Afroceto rotunda Lyle & Haddad, 2010 – South Africa
- Afroceto spicula Lyle & Haddad, 2010 – South Africa
