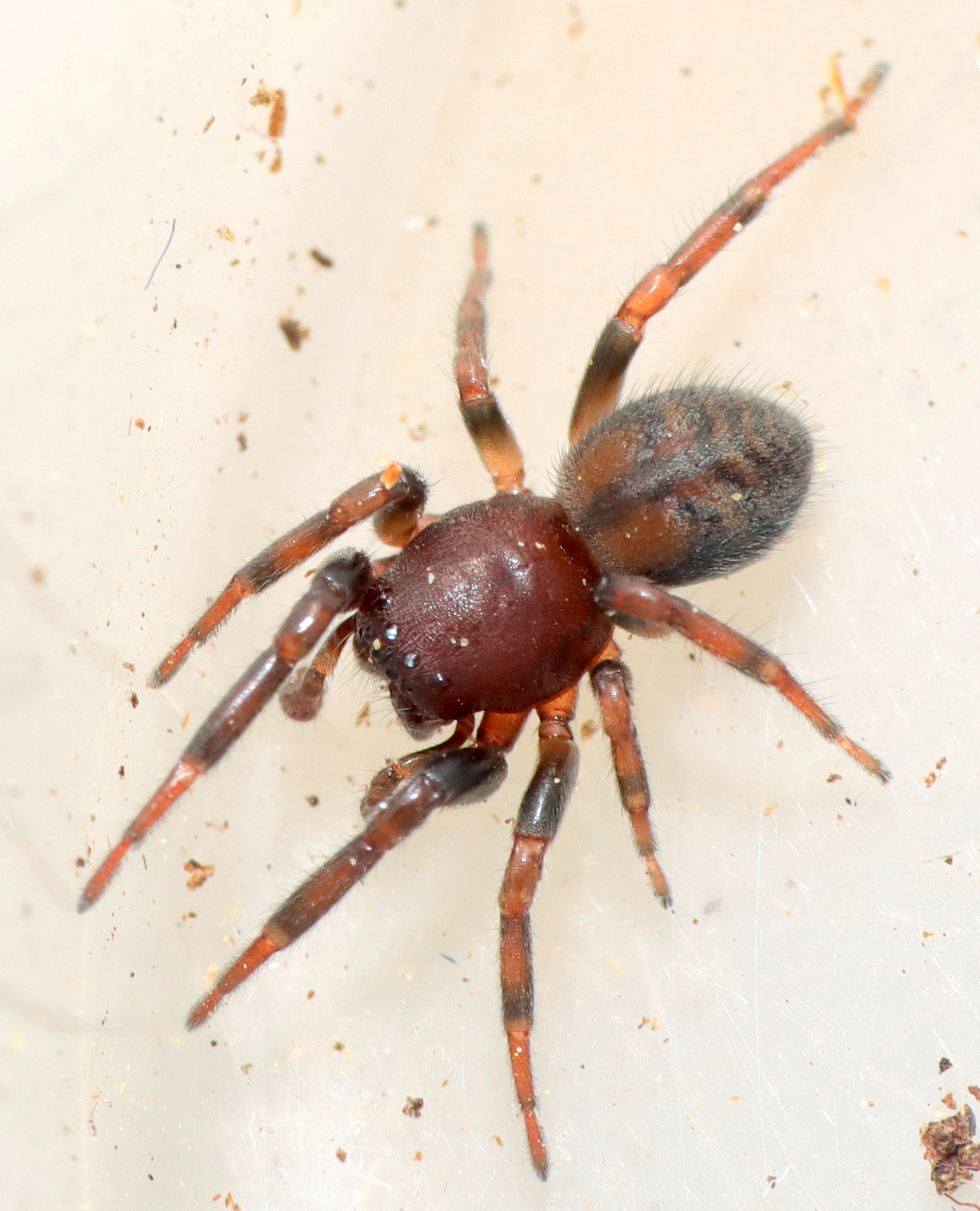

Scientific classification
- Kingdom: Animalia
- Phylum: Arthropoda
- Subphylum: Chelicerata
- Class: Arachnida
- Order: Araneae
- Infraorder: Araneomorphae
- Family: Trachelidae
- Genus: Fuchiba; Haddad & Lyle, 2008

Type species
- F. aquilonia Haddad & Lyle, 2008

Species
- 6, see text

= Fuchiba =

Genus of spiders

Fuchiba is a genus of African araneomorph spiders in the family Trachelidae. It was first described by Charles R. Haddad & R. Lyle in 2008.

== Species ==
As of October 2025, this genus includes six species:

- Fuchiba aquilonia Haddad & Lyle, 2008 – Botswana, Mozambique, South Africa (type species)
- Fuchiba capensis Haddad & Lyle, 2008 – South Africa
- Fuchiba montana Haddad & Lyle, 2008 – South Africa, Lesotho
- Fuchiba similis Haddad & Lyle, 2008 – South Africa
- Fuchiba tortilis Haddad & Lyle, 2008 – South Africa
- Fuchiba venteri Haddad & Lyle, 2008 – South Africa
