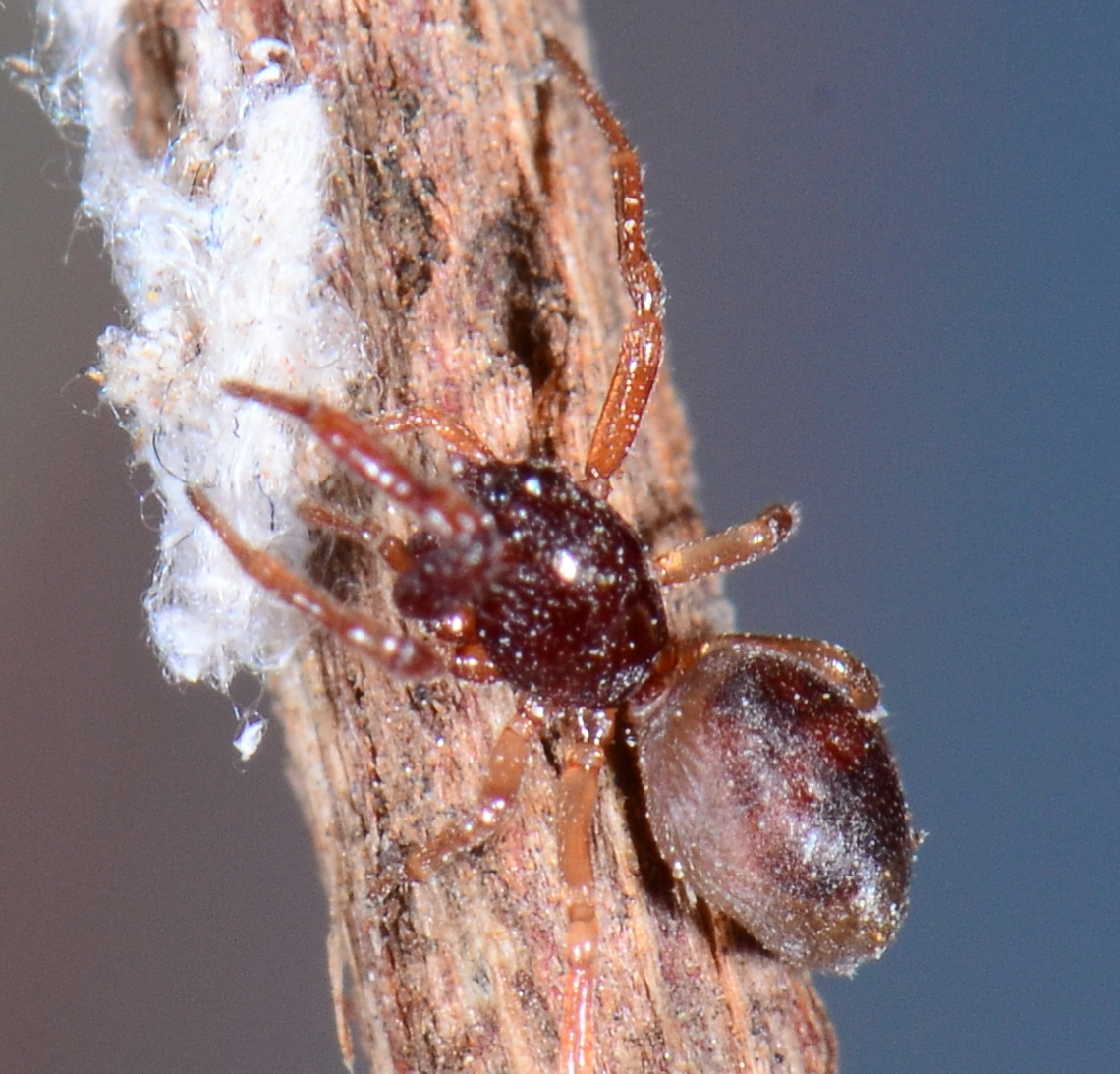
- female J. schenkeli
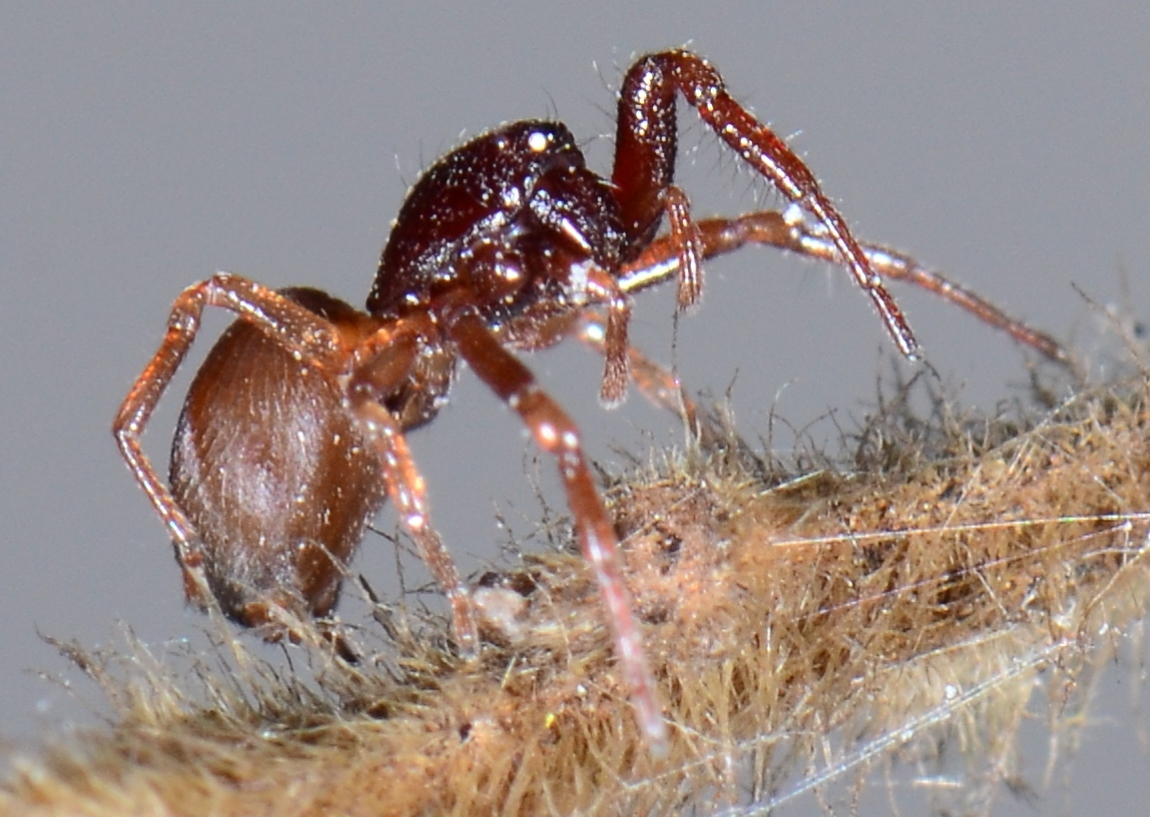
- female J. schenkeli

Scientific classification
- Kingdom: Animalia
- Phylum: Arthropoda
- Subphylum: Chelicerata
- Class: Arachnida
- Order: Araneae
- Infraorder: Araneomorphae
- Family: Trachelidae
- Genus: Jocquestus; Lyle & Haddad, 2018

Type species
- J. schenkeli (Lessert, 1923)

Species
- 7, see text

= Jocquestus =

Genus of spiders

Jocquestus is a genus of African araneomorph spiders in the family Trachelidae, first described by R. Lyle & Charles R. Haddad in 2018.

The genus is named after arachnologist Rudy Jocqué.

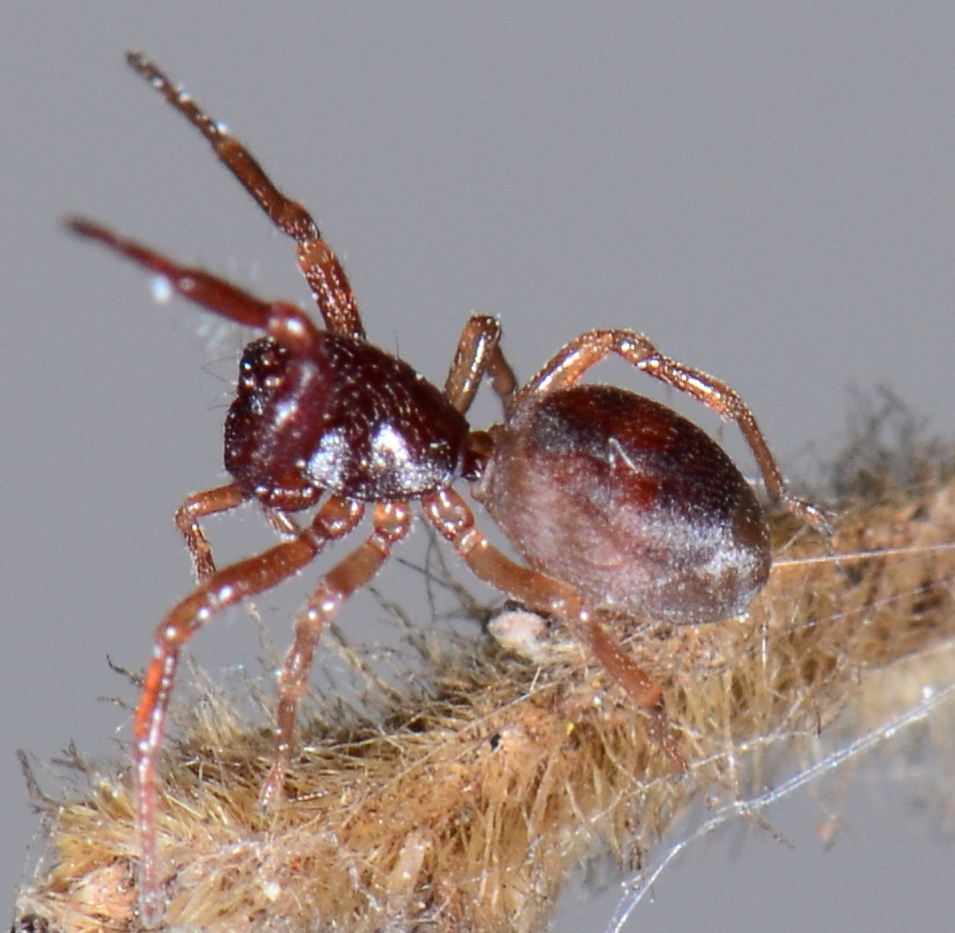
female J. schenkeli

== Species ==
As of October 2025, this genus includes seven species:

- Jocquestus capensis Lyle & Haddad, 2018 – South Africa
- Jocquestus griswoldi Lyle & Haddad, 2018 – Tanzania
- Jocquestus harrisi Lyle & Haddad, 2018 – South Africa
- Jocquestus incurvus Lyle & Haddad, 2018 – South Africa
- Jocquestus obliquus Lyle & Haddad, 2018 – Tanzania
- Jocquestus roeweri (Lawrence, 1938) – South Africa
- Jocquestus schenkeli (Lessert, 1923) – D.R. Congo, Zimbabwe, Mozambique, South Africa, Angola? (type species)
