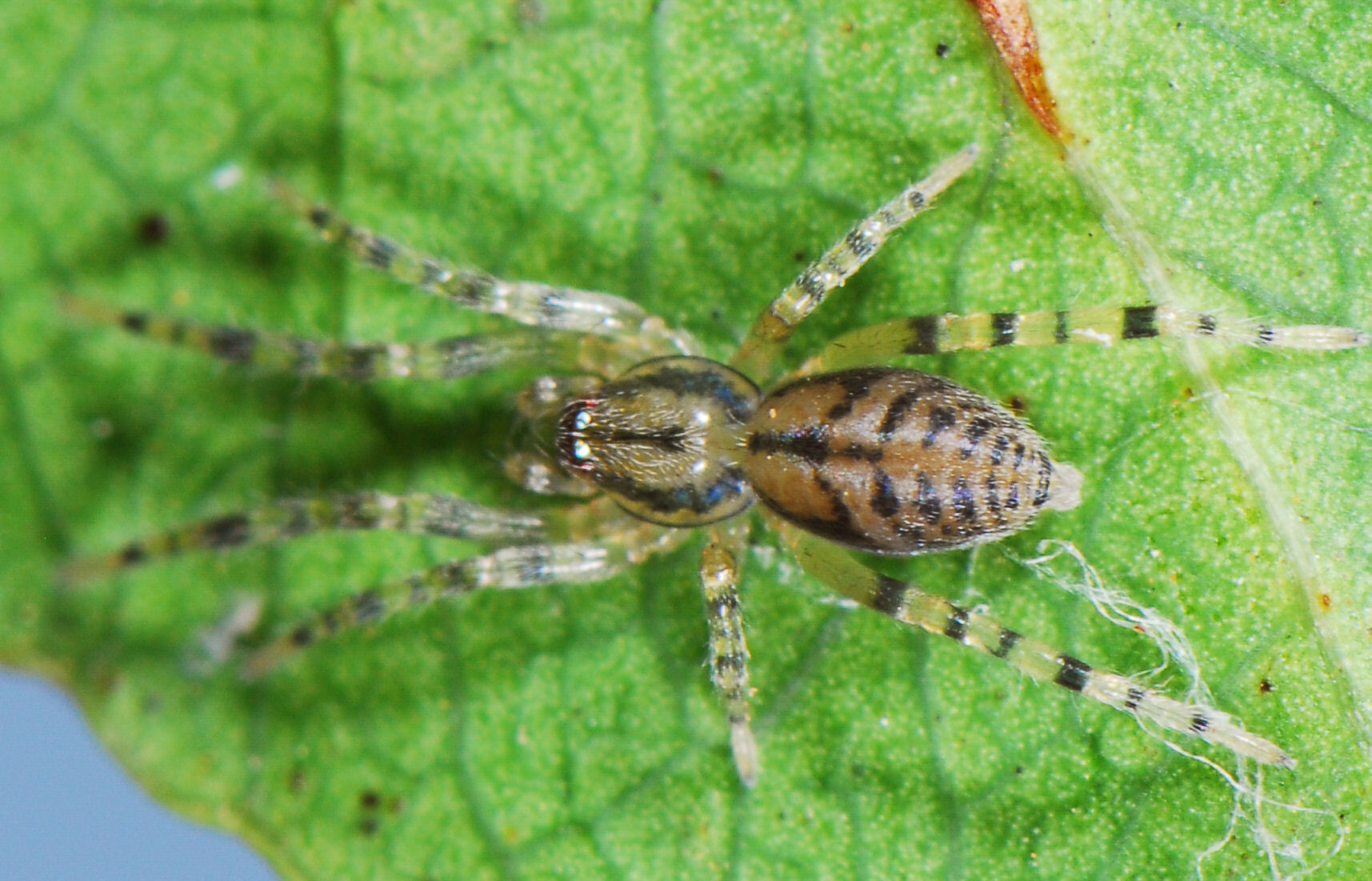
- female T. transversa
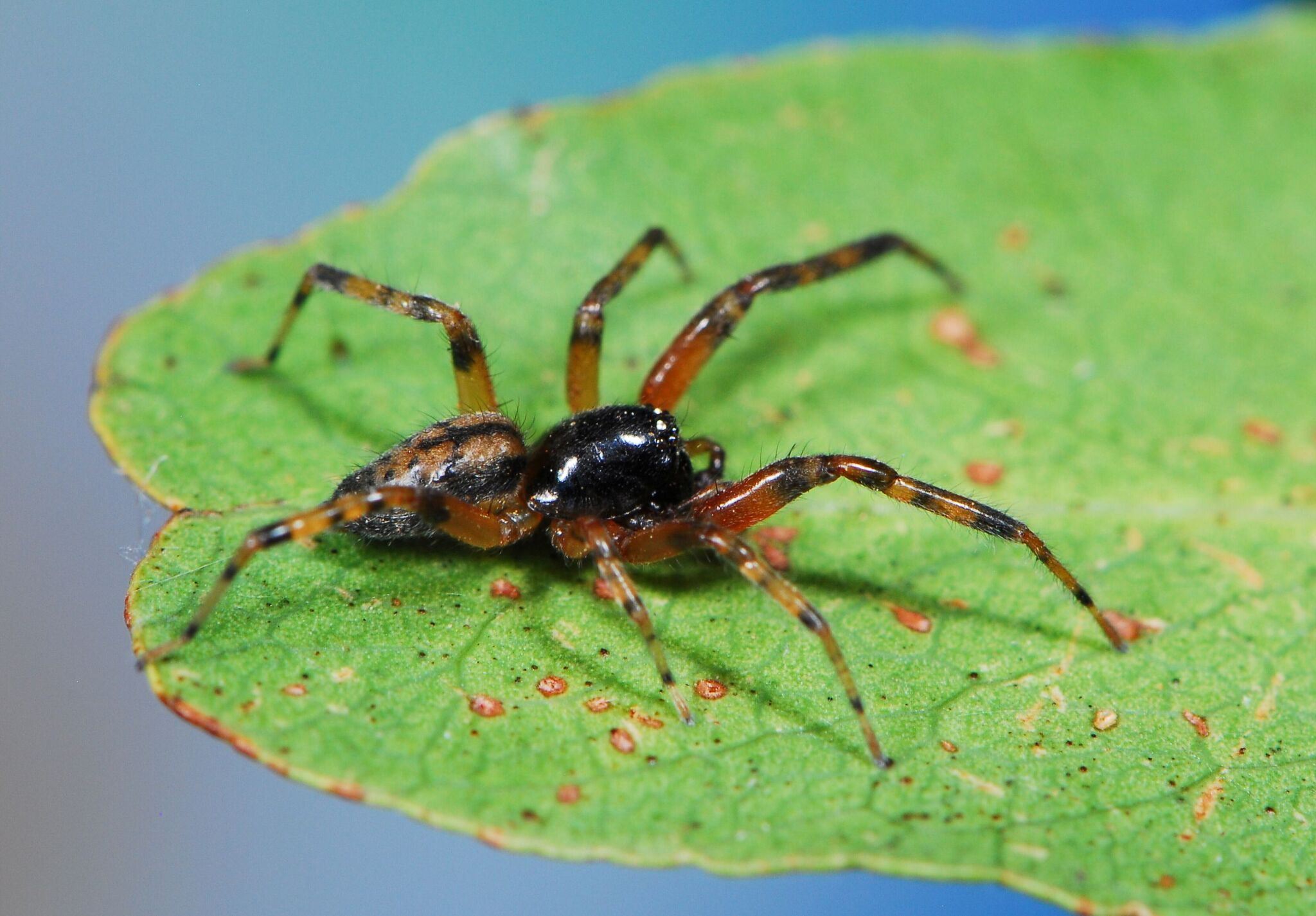
- male T. transversa

Scientific classification
- Kingdom: Animalia
- Phylum: Arthropoda
- Subphylum: Chelicerata
- Class: Arachnida
- Order: Araneae
- Infraorder: Araneomorphae
- Family: Trachelidae
- Genus: Thysanina; Simon, 1910

Type species
- T. serica Simon, 1910

Species
- 7, see text

= Thysanina =

Genus of spiders

Thysanina is a genus of African araneomorph spiders first described by Eugène Simon in 1910. Originally placed with the Liocranidae, it was moved to the Corinnidae in 2000, and to the Trachelidae in 2014.

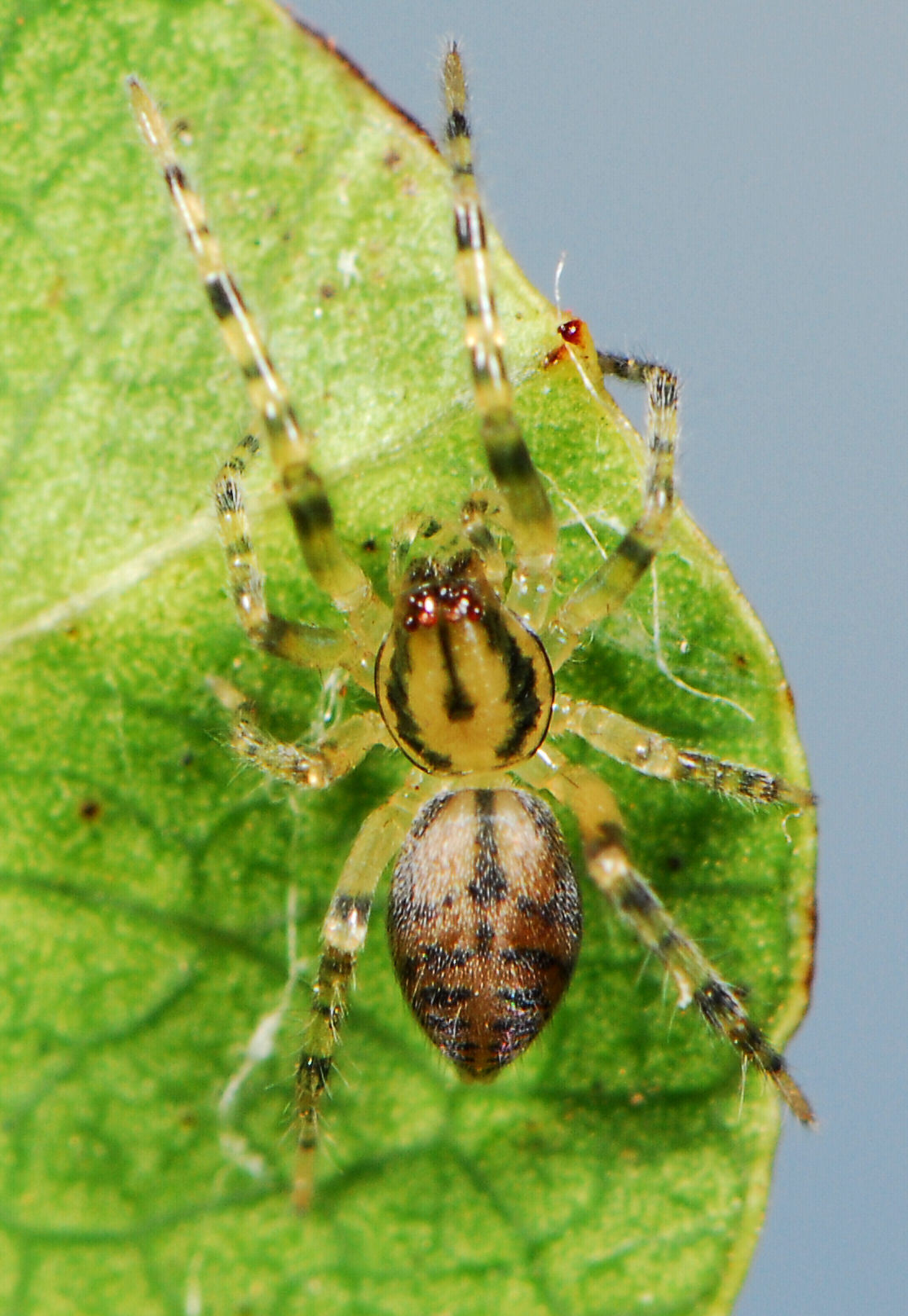
female T. transversa

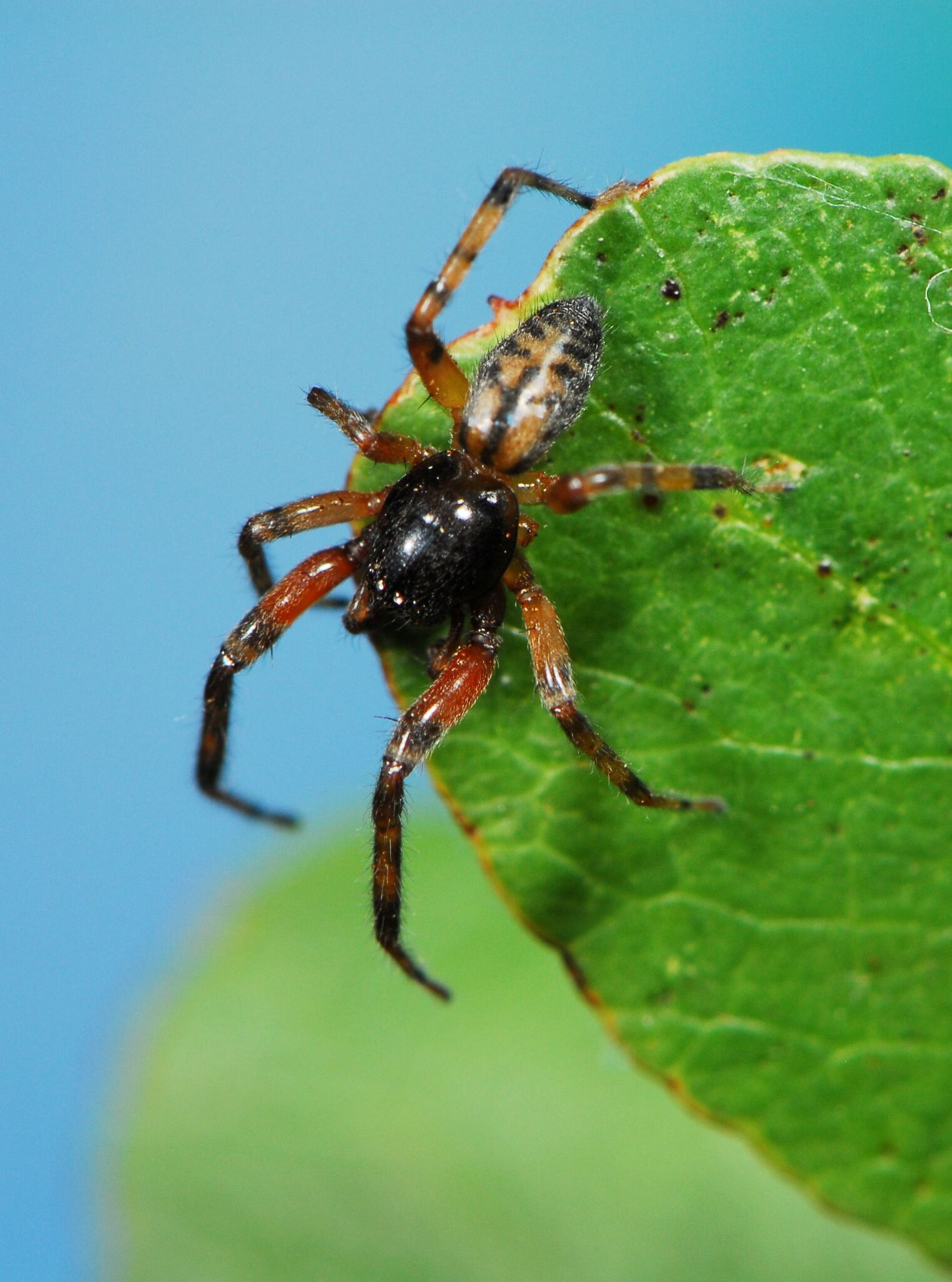
male T. transversa

== Species ==
As of October 2025, this genus includes seven species:

- Thysanina absolvo Lyle & Haddad, 2006 – South Africa
- Thysanina capensis Lyle & Haddad, 2006 – South Africa
- Thysanina gracilis Lyle & Haddad, 2006 – Namibia, South Africa
- Thysanina scopulifer (Simon, 1896) – South Africa
- Thysanina serica Simon, 1910 – Namibia, South Africa (type species)
- Thysanina similis Lyle & Haddad, 2006 – Tanzania
- Thysanina transversa Lyle & Haddad, 2006 – South Africa
