= Paccius =

Scientific classification
- Kingdom: Animalia
- Phylum: Arthropoda
- Subphylum: Chelicerata
- Class: Arachnida
- Order: Araneae
- Infraorder: Araneomorphae
- Family: Trachelidae
- Genus: Paccius; Simon, 1898

Type species
- P. madagascariensis (Simon, 1889)

Species
- 8, see text

Genus of spiders

Paccius is a genus of African araneomorph spiders first described by Eugène Simon in 1898 as a member of Corinnidae, and moved to Trachelidae in 2014.

== Species ==
As of April 2019 it contains eight species from Madagascar and Seychelles:

- Paccius angulatus Platnick, 2000 — Madagascar
- Paccius elevatus Platnick, 2000 — Madagascar
- Paccius griswoldi Platnick, 2000 — Madagascar
- Paccius madagascariensis (Simon, 1889) — Madagascar
- Paccius mucronatus Simon, 1898 — Madagascar
- Paccius quadridentatus Simon, 1898 — Seychelles
- Paccius quinteri Platnick, 2000 — Madagascar
- Paccius scharffi Platnick, 2000 — Madagascar
