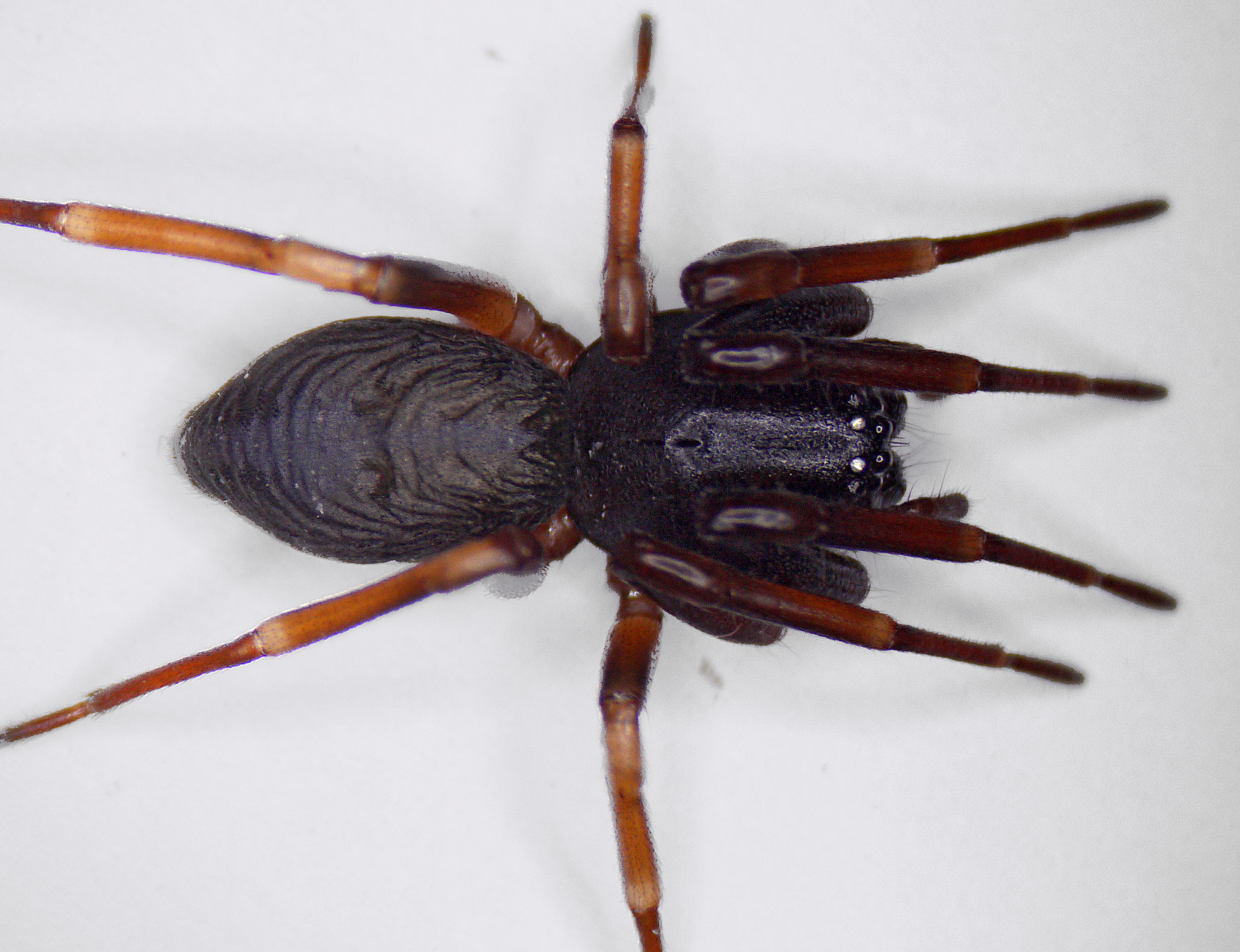
- C. laticeps

Scientific classification
- Kingdom: Animalia
- Phylum: Arthropoda
- Subphylum: Chelicerata
- Class: Arachnida
- Order: Araneae
- Infraorder: Araneomorphae
- Family: Trachelidae
- Genus: Cetonana; Strand, 1929

Type species
- C. laticeps (Canestrini, 1868)

Species
- 5, see text

= Cetonana =

Genus of spiders

Cetonana is a genus of araneomorph spiders in the family Trachelidae, first described by Embrik Strand in 1929.

== Species ==
As of April 2019 it contains five species:

- Cetonana laticeps (Canestrini, 1868) — Europe, Russia (Caucasus)
- Cetonana lineolata (Mello-Leitão, 1941) — Brazil
- Cetonana petrunkevitchi Mello-Leitão, 1945 — Brazil
- Cetonana setosa (Simon, 1897) — Brazil
- Cetonana shaanxiensis Jin, Yin & Zhang, 2017 — China
