= Paraceto =

Scientific classification
- Domain: Eukaryota
- Kingdom: Animalia
- Phylum: Arthropoda
- Subphylum: Chelicerata
- Class: Arachnida
- Order: Araneae
- Infraorder: Araneomorphae
- Family: Trachelidae
- Genus: Paraceto; Jin, Yin & Zhang, 2017

Type species
- P. spiralis Jin, Yin & Zhang, 2017

Species
- P. orientalis (Schenkel, 1936) — China, Korea; P. spiralis Jin, Yin & Zhang, 2017 — China

Genus of spiders

Paraceto is a genus of Chinese and Korean araneomorph spiders in the family Trachelidae, first described by C. Jin, X. C. Yin & F. Zhang in 2017. As of April 2019 it contains only two species.
