= Metatrachelas =

Scientific classification
- Kingdom: Animalia
- Phylum: Arthropoda
- Subphylum: Chelicerata
- Class: Arachnida
- Order: Araneae
- Infraorder: Araneomorphae
- Family: Trachelidae
- Genus: Metatrachelas; Bosselaers & Bosmans, 2010

Type species
- M. rayi (Simon, 1878)

Species
- M. amabilis (Simon, 1878) — Algeria, Tunisia; M. macrochelis (Wunderlich, 1992) — Spain, Canary Is., Azores, Algeria; M. rayi (Simon, 1878) — Spain, France, Italy, Algeria

Genus of spiders

Metatrachelas is a genus of araneomorph spiders in the family Trachelidae, first described by J. Bosselaers & R. Bosmans in 2010. As of April 2019 it contains only three species.
