= Paratrachelas =

Scientific classification
- Domain: Eukaryota
- Kingdom: Animalia
- Phylum: Arthropoda
- Subphylum: Chelicerata
- Class: Arachnida
- Order: Araneae
- Infraorder: Araneomorphae
- Family: Trachelidae
- Genus: Paratrachelas; Kovblyuk & Nadolny, 2009

Type species
- P. maculatus (Thorell, 1875)

Species
- 5, see text

Genus of spiders

Paratrachelas is a genus of araneomorph spiders in the family Trachelidae, first described by M. M. Kovblyuk & A. A. Nadolny in 2009.

== Species ==
As of April 2019 it contains five species:

- Paratrachelas acuminus (Zhu & An, 1988) — Russia (Far East), China, Korea
- Paratrachelas atlantis Bosselaers & Bosmans, 2010 — Algeria
- Paratrachelas ibericus (Bosselaers, Urones, Barrientos & Alberdi, 2009) — Portugal, Spain, France, Algeria
- Paratrachelas maculatus (Thorell, 1875) — France to Ukraine, Turkey, Israel
- Paratrachelas validus (Simon, 1884) — Portugal, Spain, Italy
