= Charles R. Haddad =

Arachnologist

Charles Richard Haddad
- Born: February 21, 1979 (age 47); Bloemfontein, Free State, South Africa
- Education: University of the Free State
- Known for: Systematics and ecology of African spiders
- Scientific career
- Fields: Arachnology
- Workplaces: University of the Free State

Charles Richard Haddad (born 21 February 1979) is a South African arachnologist.

== Biography ==
Haddad attended St. Andrew’s School in Bloemfontein from 1985 to 1996. In 1997, he enrolled at the University of the Free State, where he obtained a BSc in 2000 and a BSc with honours in Entomology the following year. In 2002 he began a master’s degree, which he completed in 2003 with the thesis Spider ecology in pistachio orchards in South Africa, receiving the award cum laude. From 2004 he undertook doctoral studies at the University of the Free State, completing his PhD in Entomology in 2012 with the dissertation Advances in the systematics and ecology of African Corinnidae spiders (Arachnida: Araneae), with emphasis on the Castianeirinae.

Since 1999 Haddad has been a practical demonstrator in zoology at the University of the Free State. From 2000 to 2004 he worked as an entomologist and consultant for pistachio farmers at the Green Valley Nuts Estate in the Prieska district, Northern Cape. From November to December 2000 he conducted a study of insect and arachnid biodiversity in the Ndumo Game Reserve in northern KwaZulu-Natal. In January 2002, he studied the biodiversity of insects and arachnids in the Tembe Elephant Park in northern KwaZulu-Natal.

In March and December 2003, he participated in surveys of invertebrate diversity at the Mohale Dam in the highlands of Lesotho, and the rescue of invertebrates from the dam’s flood zone. In November 2003, he conducted studies in the Maloti Mountains of southern Lesotho to assess the diversity of arachnids in the region. From January 2004 to December 2005, Haddad was a junior lecturer at the University of the Free State. From January 2006 to December 2012, he was a lecturer in entomology at the University. Since March 2006, he has been assistant project leader for the South African National Survey of Arachnida (SANSA). Since February 2008, he has been president of the African Arachnological Society (AFRAS). Since January 2013, he has been senior lecturer in entomology at the University of the Free State.

Haddad’s research focuses on the systematics and ecology of Corinnidae (ant-mimicking spiders), Salticidae (jumping spiders), and other selected spider groups; the ecology and biodiversity of spiders in agroecosystems, nature reserves, and natural habitats; spiders associated with termites and ants; arachnid karyology and chromosome development; spider predatory behaviour; and spider parasites.

He contributed to the books First Atlas of the Spiders of South Africa (Arachnida: Araneae) (2010), Spiders of the Savanna Biome of South Africa (2013), and Spiders of the Grassland Biome (2014), edited by arachnologist Ansie S. Dippenaar-Schoeman.

== Eponyms ==
Several spider species have been named after Haddad, including: Afrarchaea haddadi, Loxosceles haddadi, Cheiramiona haddadi, Caddella haddadi, Fuchibotulus haddadi, Planochelas haddadi, Ballomma haddadi, Myrmecotypus haddadi, Metellina haddadi, Australoonops haddadi, Eleleis haddadi, Festucula haddadi, Lepthercus haddadi, Simorcus haddadi, and Thyenula haddadi.
