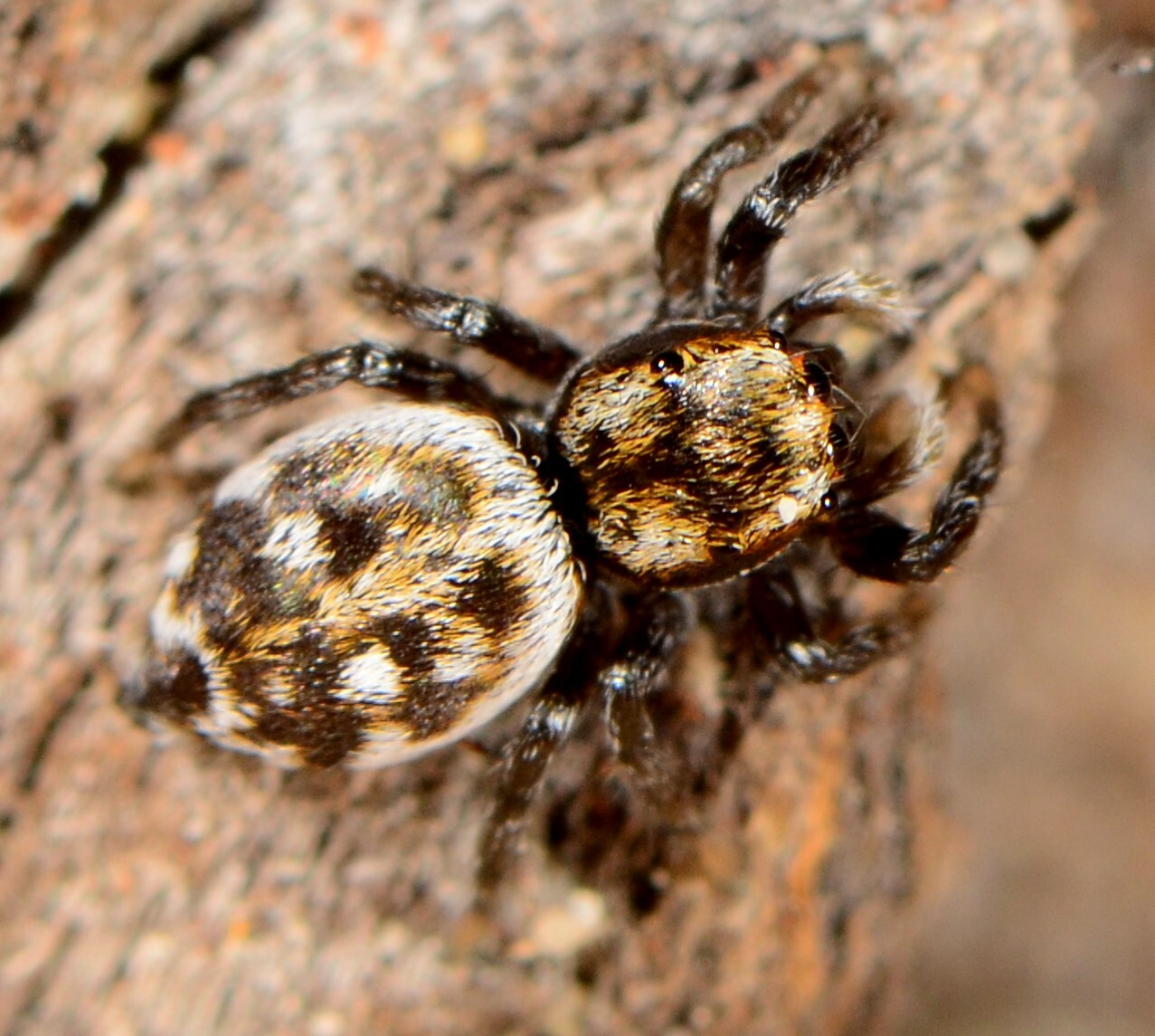
- female H. capensis
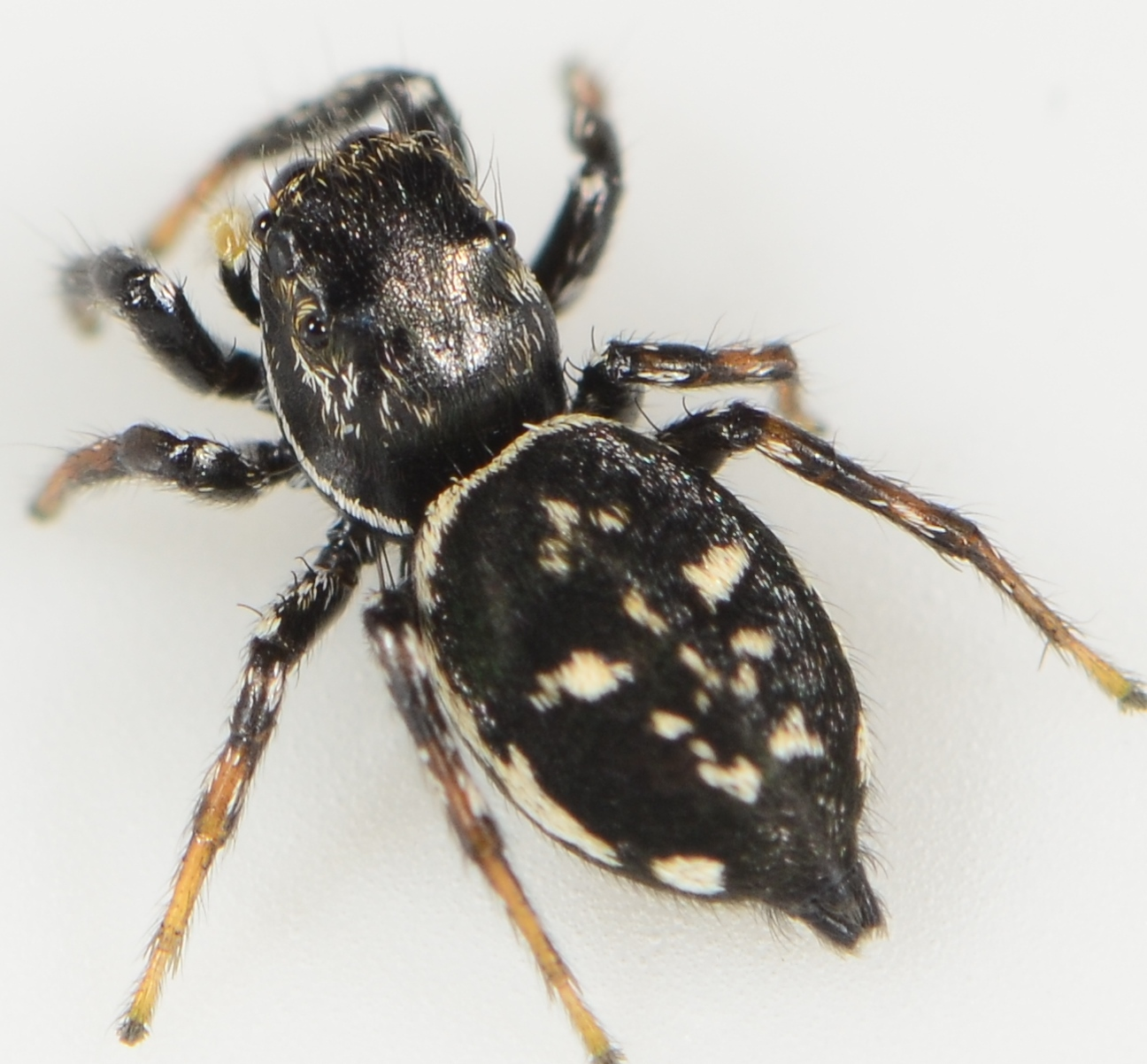
- female H. deserticola

Scientific classification
- Kingdom: Animalia
- Phylum: Arthropoda
- Subphylum: Chelicerata
- Class: Arachnida
- Order: Araneae
- Infraorder: Araneomorphae
- Family: Salticidae
- Subfamily: Salticinae
- Genus: Heliocapensis; Wesołowska, 1986

Type species
- Heliocapensis peckhami Simon, 1902

Species
- See text.

Synonyms
- Heliophanus

= Heliocapensis =

Genus of spiders

Heliocapensis is a mainly South African genus of the spider family Salticidae (jumping spiders).

== Distribution ==
Most species in this genus are endemic to South Africa, with a few found in .

== Life style ==
These are free-living spiders found on the ground or plant-dwellers collected from various habitat types.

== Description ==
These are small salticids, measuring between 3.0 and 4.5 mm in length.

Males are characterized by black coloration with distinctive white markings. A thin line traverses the anterior region of the abdomen, accompanied by two or three pairs of rounded or obliquely-oriented white markings. These markings consist of white setae or microscopic scales and tend to fade as the specimen ages.

== Taxonomy ==
The genus Heliocapensis was elevated from a subgenus of Heliophanus C. L. Koch, 1833 by Wesołowska in 2024.

== Species ==
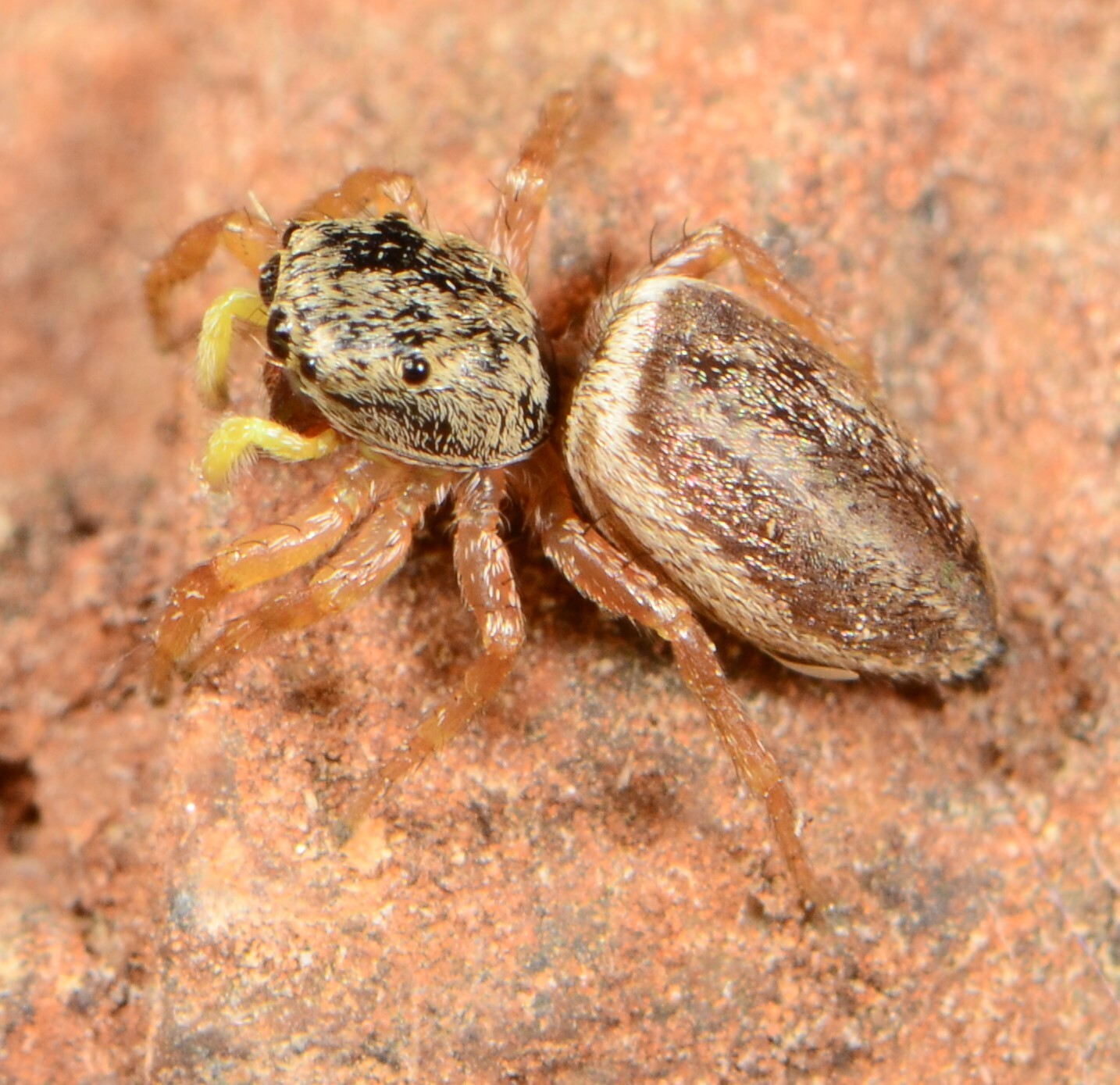
female H. aberdarensis

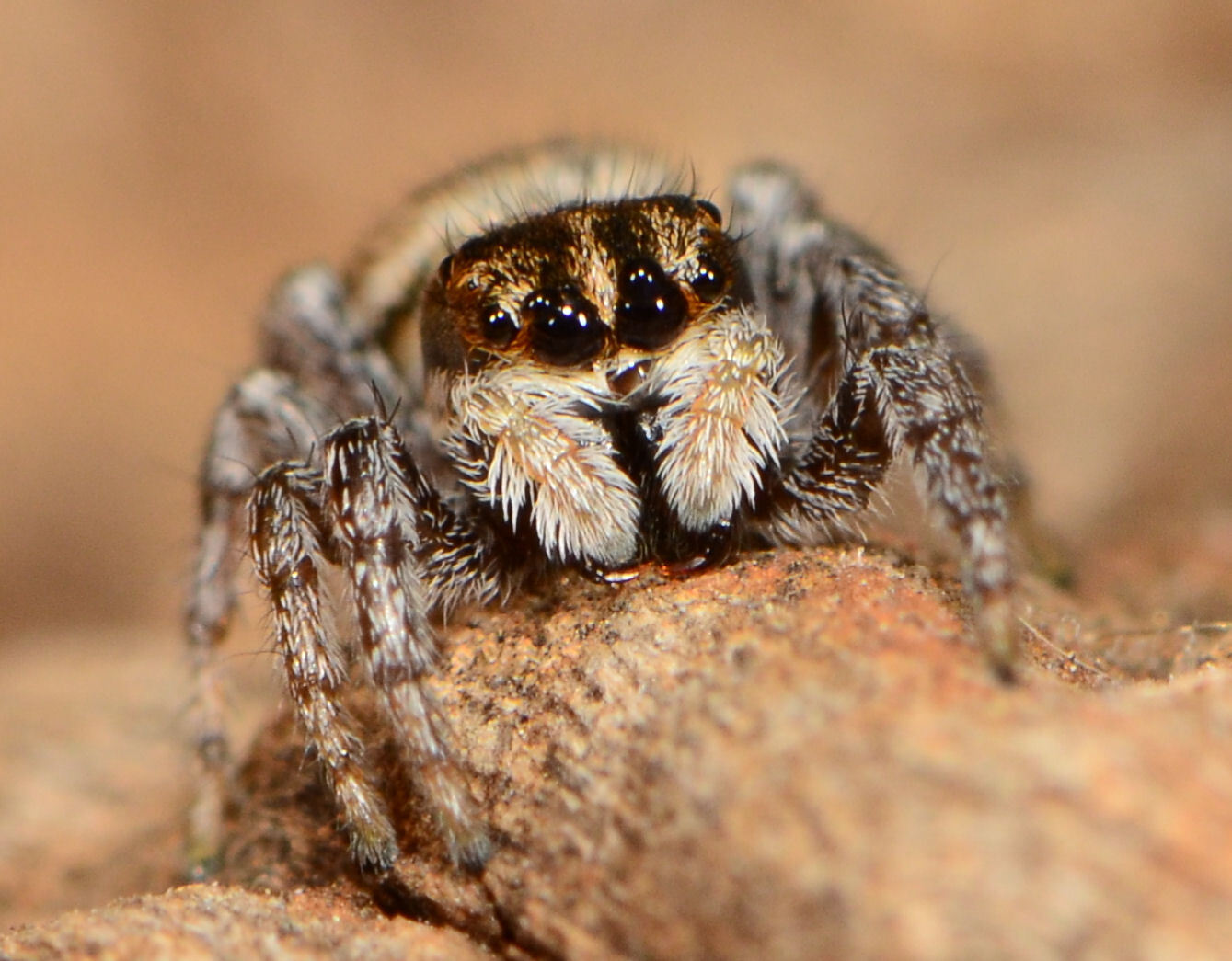
female H. capensis

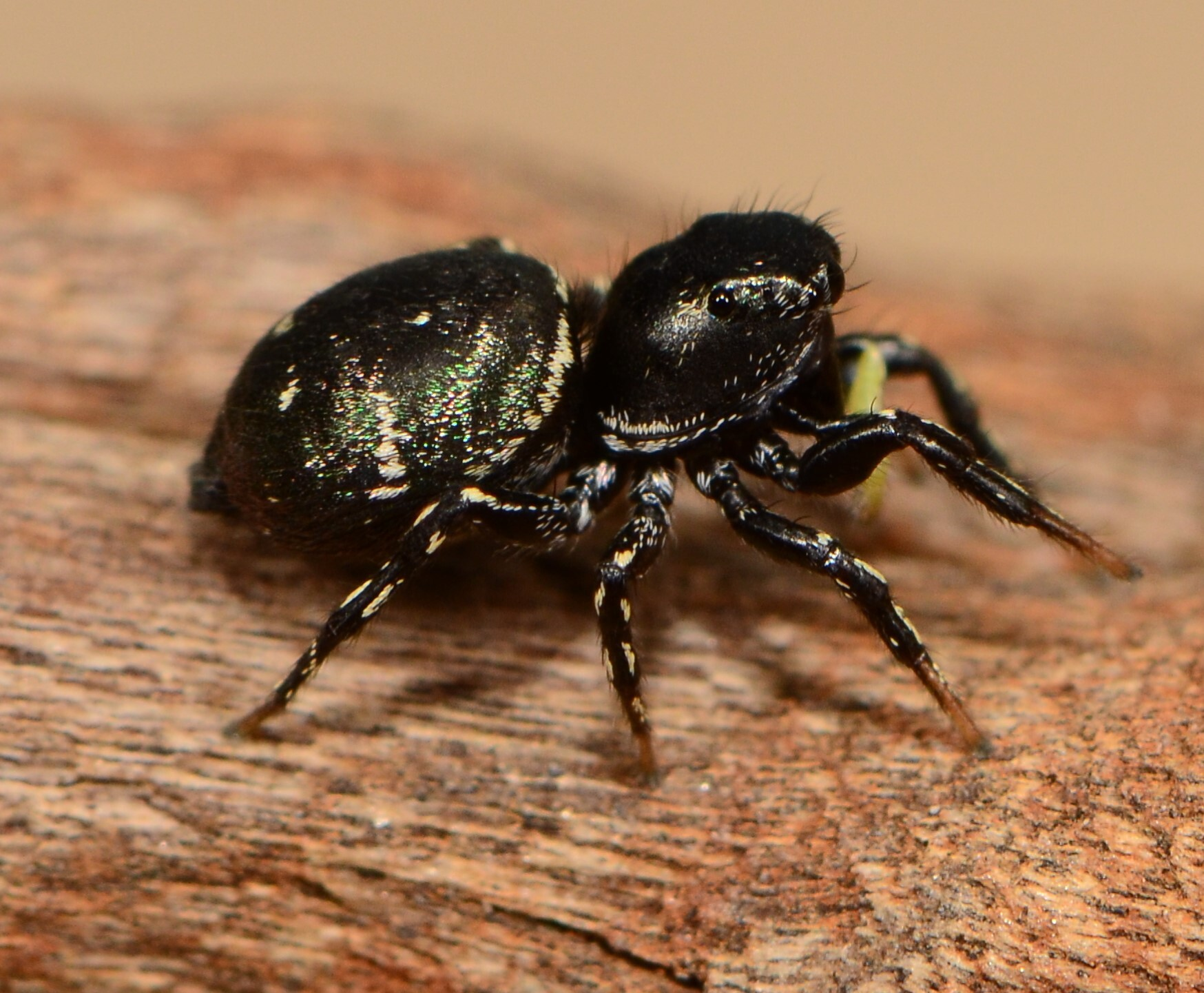
female H. peckhami

As of October 2025, this genus includes fourteen species:

- Heliocapensis aberdarensis (Wesołowska, 1986) – Kenya, South Africa
- Heliocapensis bellus (Wesołowska, 1986) – South Africa
- Heliocapensis capensis (Wesołowska, 1986) – South Africa
- Heliocapensis charlesi (Wesołowska, 2003) – South Africa
- Heliocapensis chikangawanus (Wesołowska, 1986) – Angola, Malawi
- Heliocapensis claviger (Simon, 1901) – Mozambique, South Africa
- Heliocapensis deserticola (Simon, 1901) – South Africa
- Heliocapensis lola Wesołowska & Henrard, 2025 – Guinea
- Heliocapensis maluti (Wesołowska & Haddad, 2014) – South Africa, Lesotho
- Heliocapensis mirabilis (Wesołowska, 1986) – South Africa
- Heliocapensis peckhami (Simon, 1902) – South Africa (type species)
- Heliocapensis portentosus (Wesołowska, 1986) – South Africa
- Heliocapensis redimitus (Simon, 1910) – South Africa
- Heliocapensis termitophagus (Wesołowska & Haddad, 2002) – South Africa
