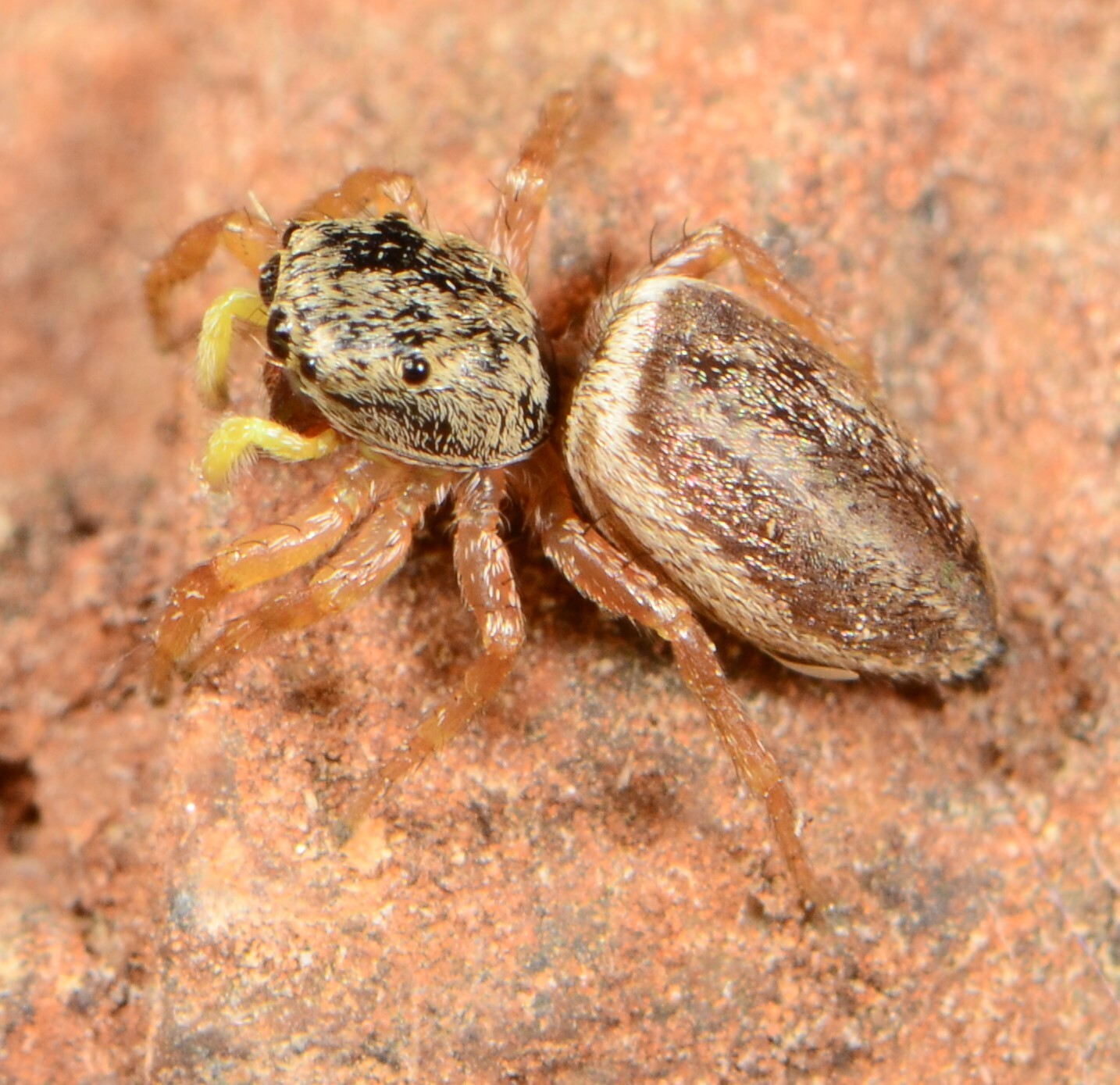
- female
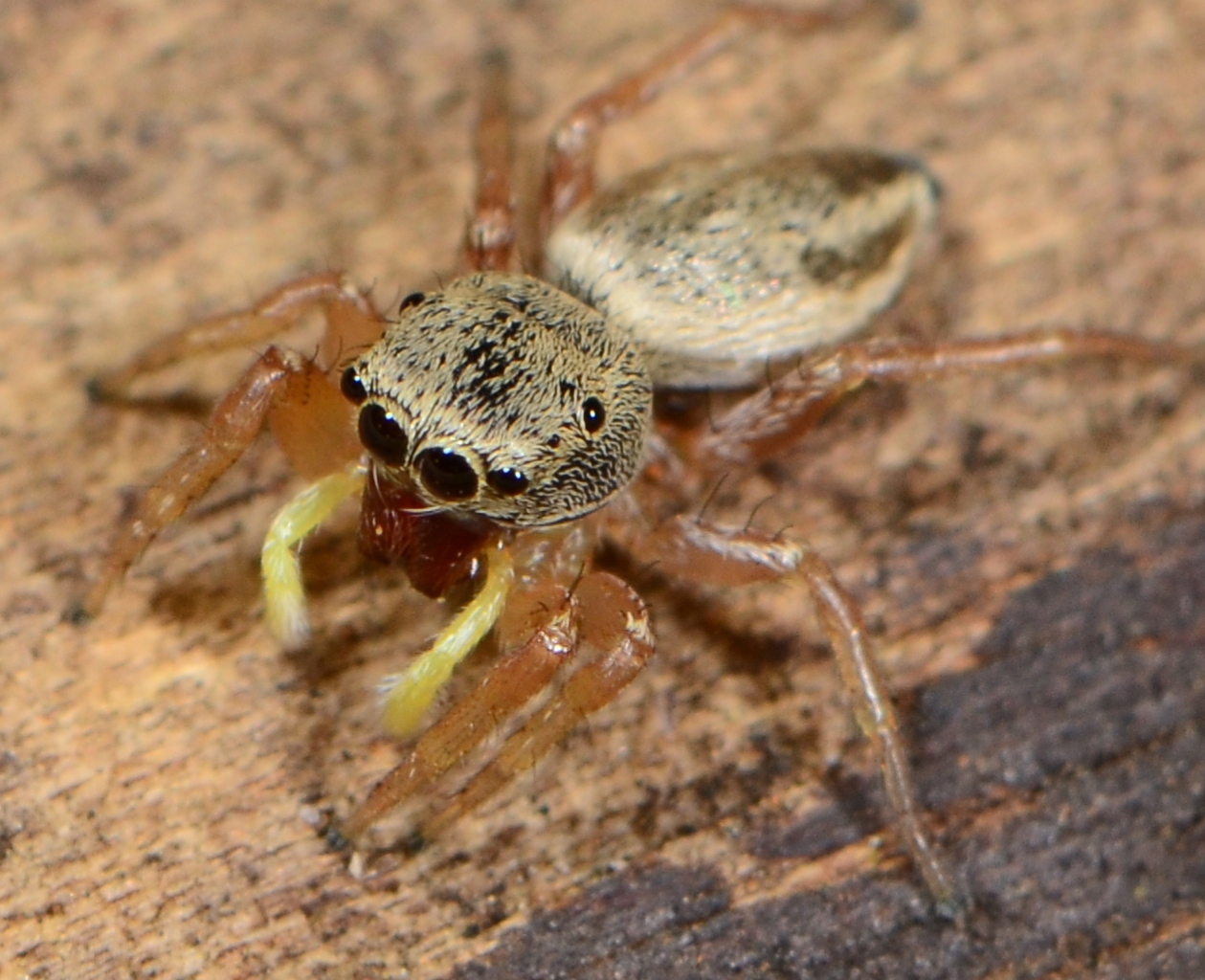
- female

Scientific classification
- Kingdom: Animalia
- Phylum: Arthropoda
- Subphylum: Chelicerata
- Class: Arachnida
- Order: Araneae
- Infraorder: Araneomorphae
- Family: Salticidae
- Genus: Heliocapensis
- Species: H. aberdarensis

Binomial name
- Heliocapensis aberdarensis (Wesołowska, 1986)

Synonyms
- Heliophanus aberdarensis Wesołowska, 1986

= Heliocapensis aberdarensis =

Aberdare Heliocapensis Sunny Jumping Spider

Species of spider

Heliocapensis aberdarensis is a species of jumping spider in the family Salticidae. It is found in Kenya and South Africa and is commonly known as the Aberdare Heliocapensis sunny jumping spider.

== Distribution ==
Heliocapensis aberdarensis is found in Kenya and South Africa. It is possibly undersampled and is expected to occur in more countries in between.

In South Africa, the species is known from Eastern Cape, Free State, Gauteng, KwaZulu-Natal, and Mpumalanga. Notable locations include Addo National Park, Golden Gate Highlands National Park, Platberg Nature Reserve, Suikerbosrand Nature Reserve, Royal Natal National Park, and Loskop Dam Nature Reserve.

== Habitat and ecology ==
The species was recorded from alpine grasslands in East Africa.

In South Africa it occurs on grasses and short shrubs in the Grassland, Savanna and Thicket biomes at altitudes ranging from 37 to 2204 m.

== Description ==
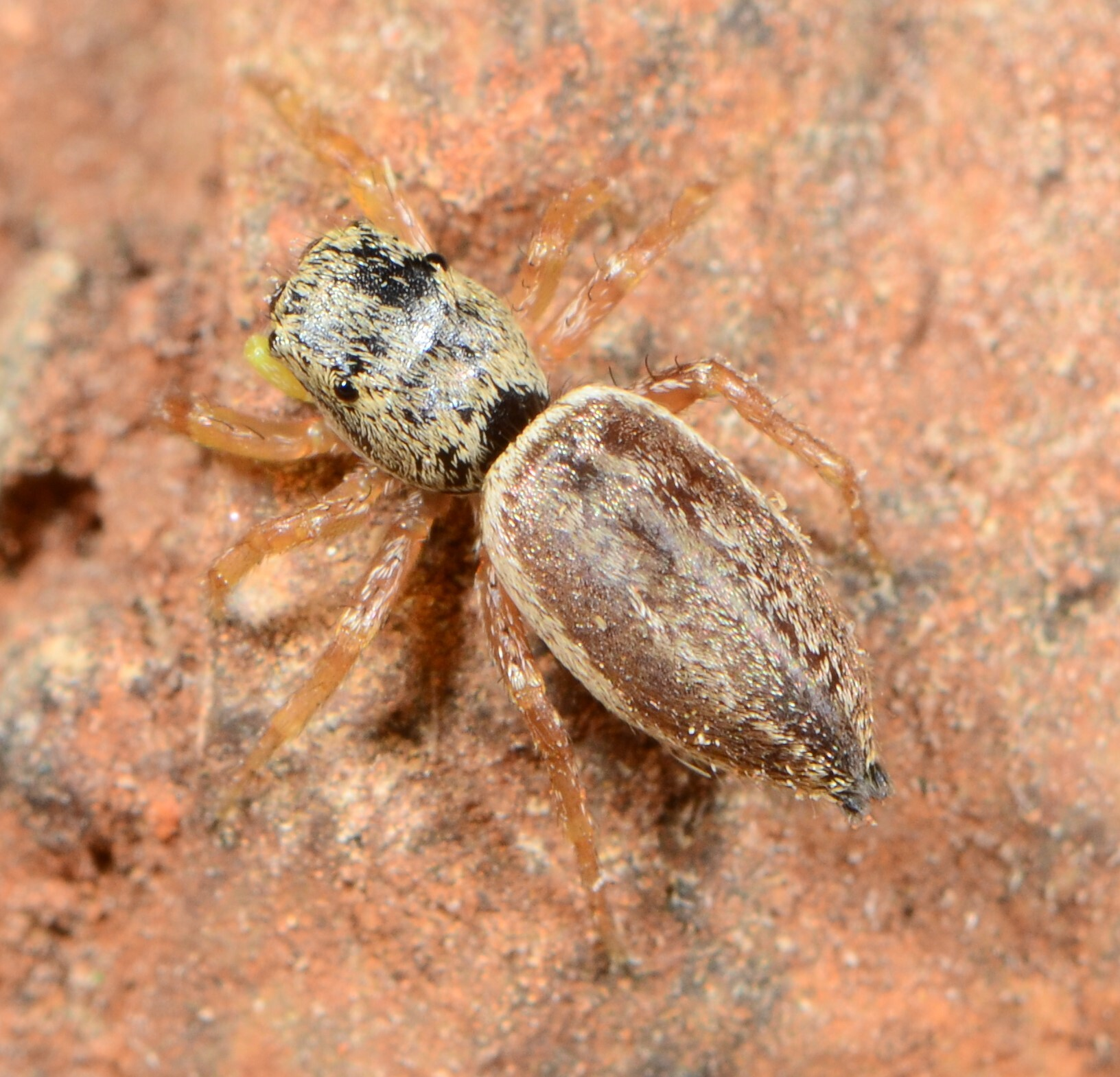
female

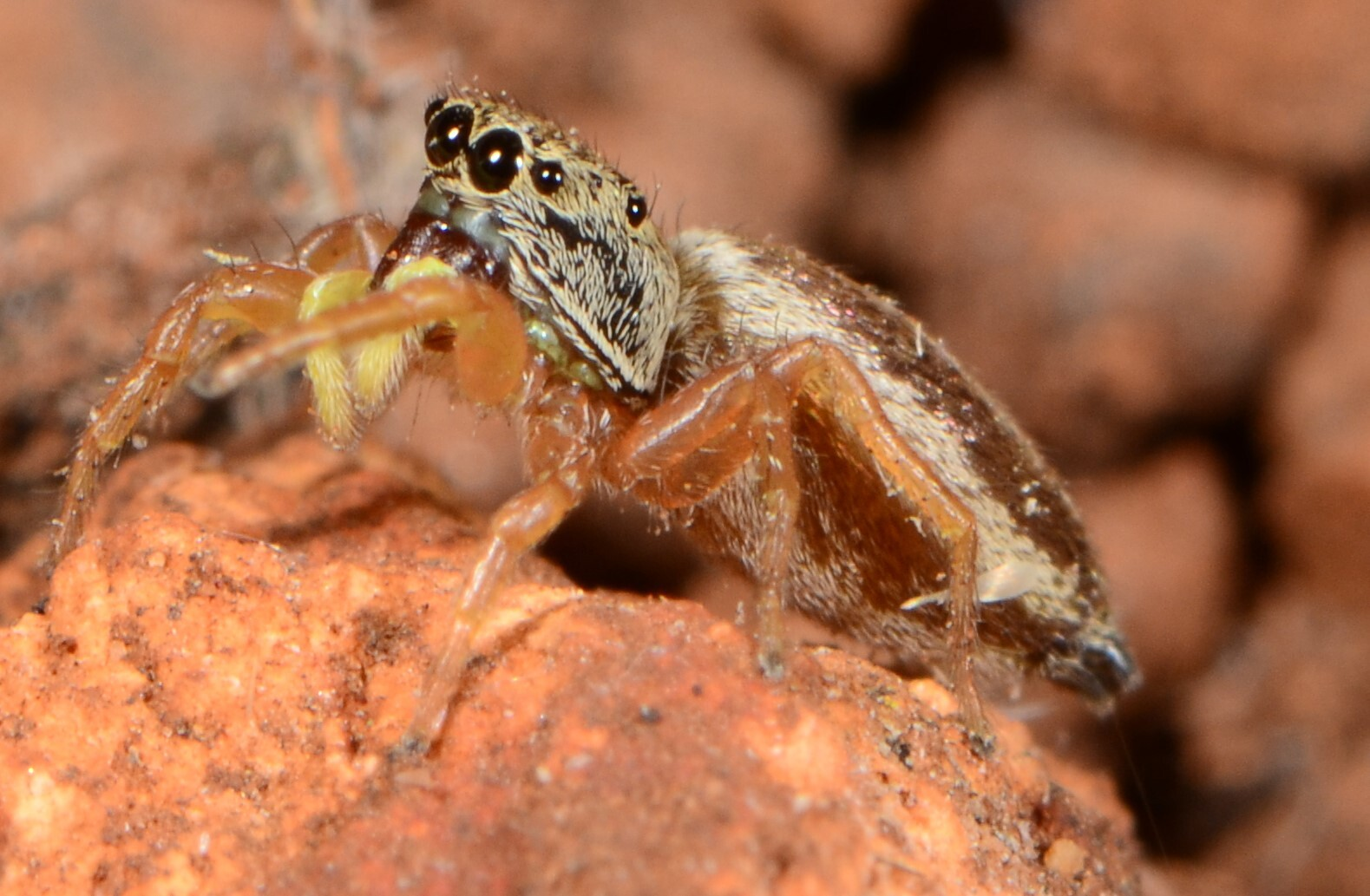
female

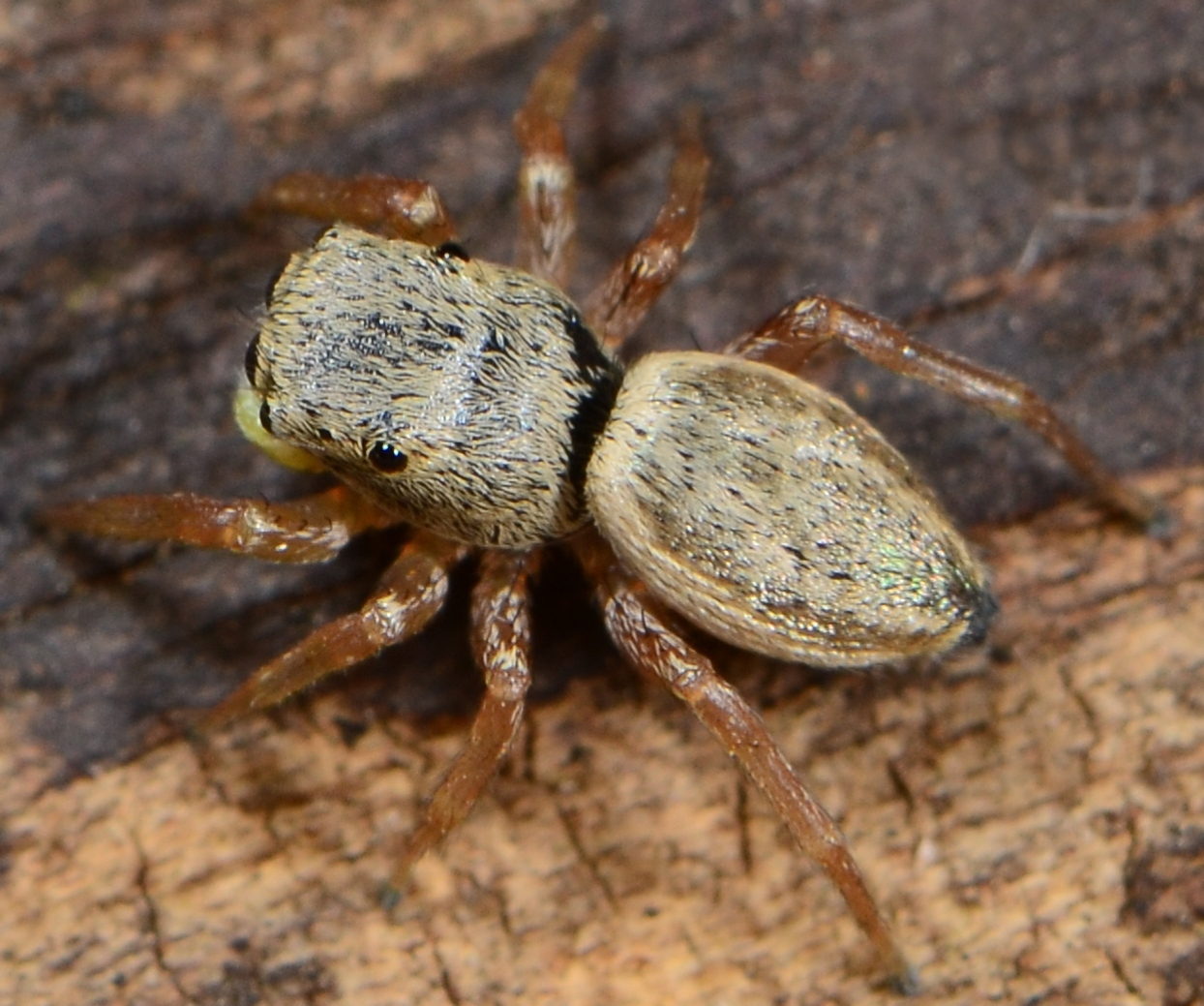
female

== Conservation ==
Heliocapensis aberdarensis is listed as Least Concern due to its wide geographical range. No threats are known and the species is protected in six protected areas including Addo National Park, Golden Gate Highlands National Park, Platberg Nature Reserve, Suikerbosrand Nature Reserve, Royal Natal National Park, and Loskop Dam Nature Reserve.

== Taxonomy ==
The female was described by Wesołowska in 1986. The male was added by Wesołowska and Haddad in 2013. The species was transferred to Heliocapensis by Wesołowska in 2024.
