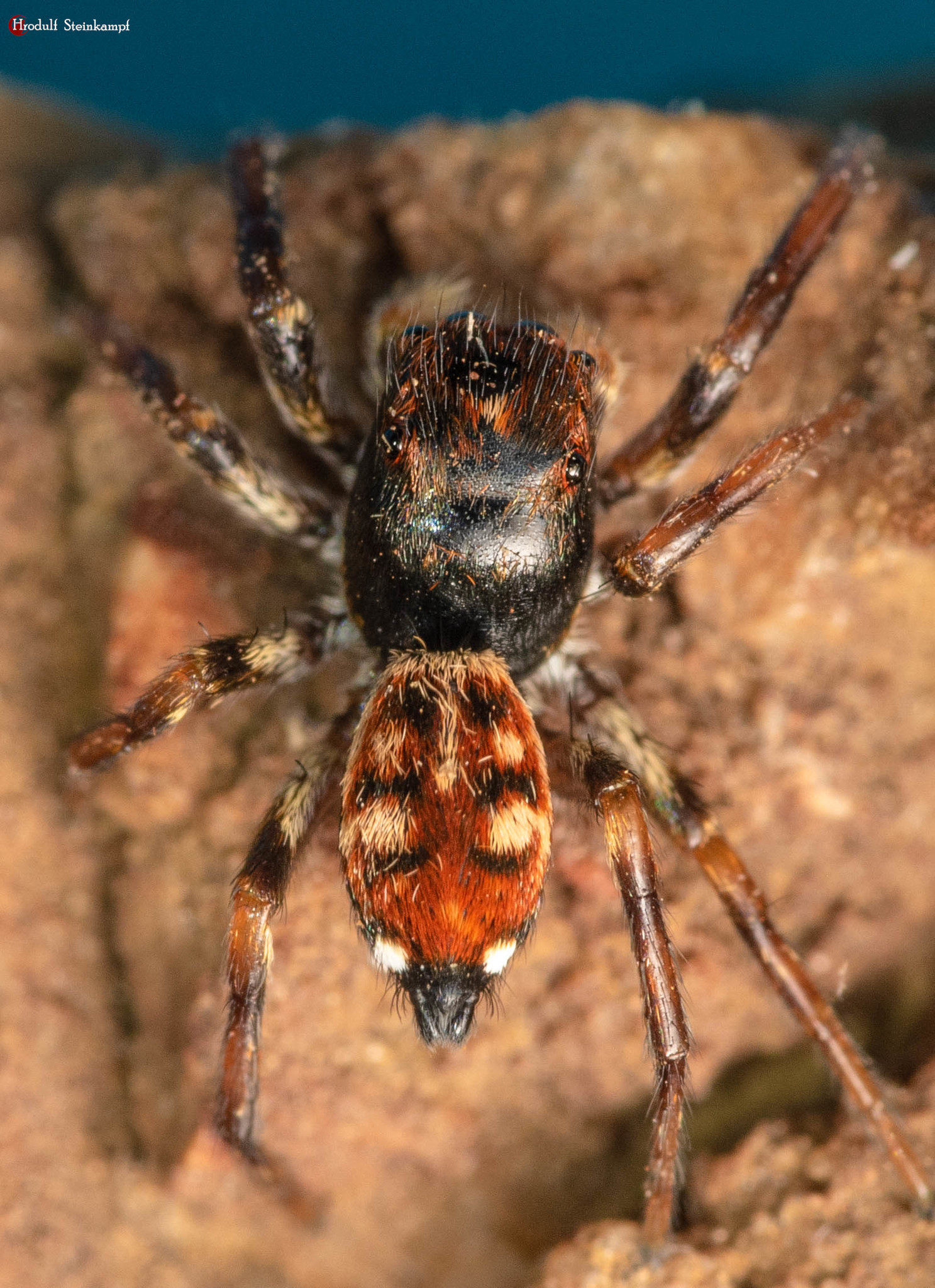

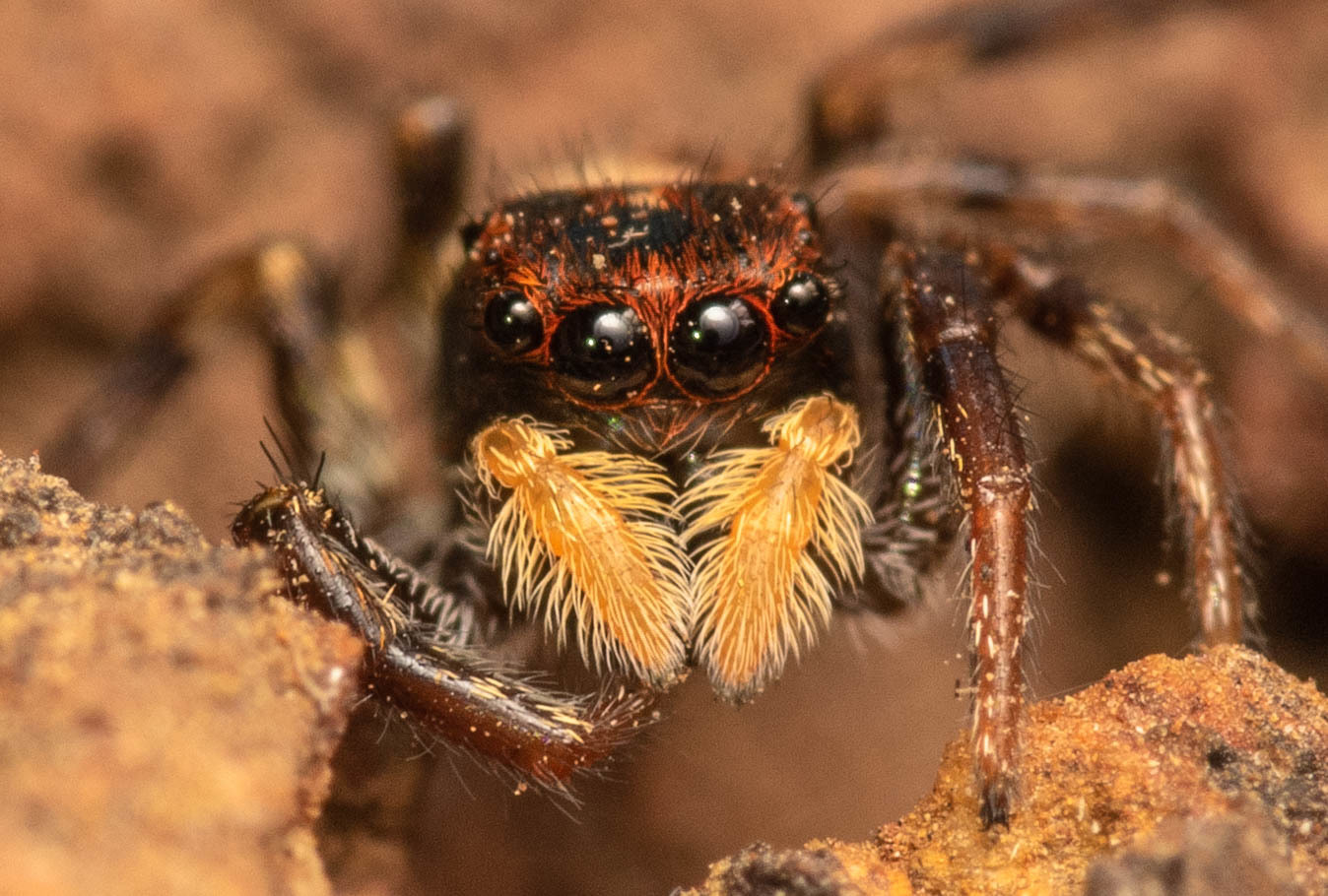

Scientific classification
- Kingdom: Animalia
- Phylum: Arthropoda
- Subphylum: Chelicerata
- Class: Arachnida
- Order: Araneae
- Infraorder: Araneomorphae
- Family: Salticidae
- Genus: Heliocapensis
- Species: H. termitophagus

Binomial name
- Heliocapensis termitophagus (Wesołowska & Haddad, 2002)

Synonyms
- Heliophanus termitophagus Wesołowska & Haddad, 2002; Heliophanus thaleri Wesołowska, 2009

= Heliocapensis termitophagus =

Termite-feeding Heliocapensis Sunny Jumping Spider

Species of spider

Heliocapensis termitophagus is a species of jumping spider in the family Salticidae. It is endemic to South Africa and is commonly known as the termite-feeding Heliocapensis sunny jumping spider.

== Distribution ==
Heliocapensis termitophagus has been sampled from two provinces of South Africa, the Northern Cape and Free State. Locations include Benfontein Nature Reserve, Bloemfontein, Erfenis Dam Nature Reserve, and Tussen-die-Riviere Nature Reserve.

== Habitat and ecology ==
Heliocapensis termitophagus has been sampled from the Grassland Biome at altitudes ranging from 1235 to 1399 m.

== Description ==
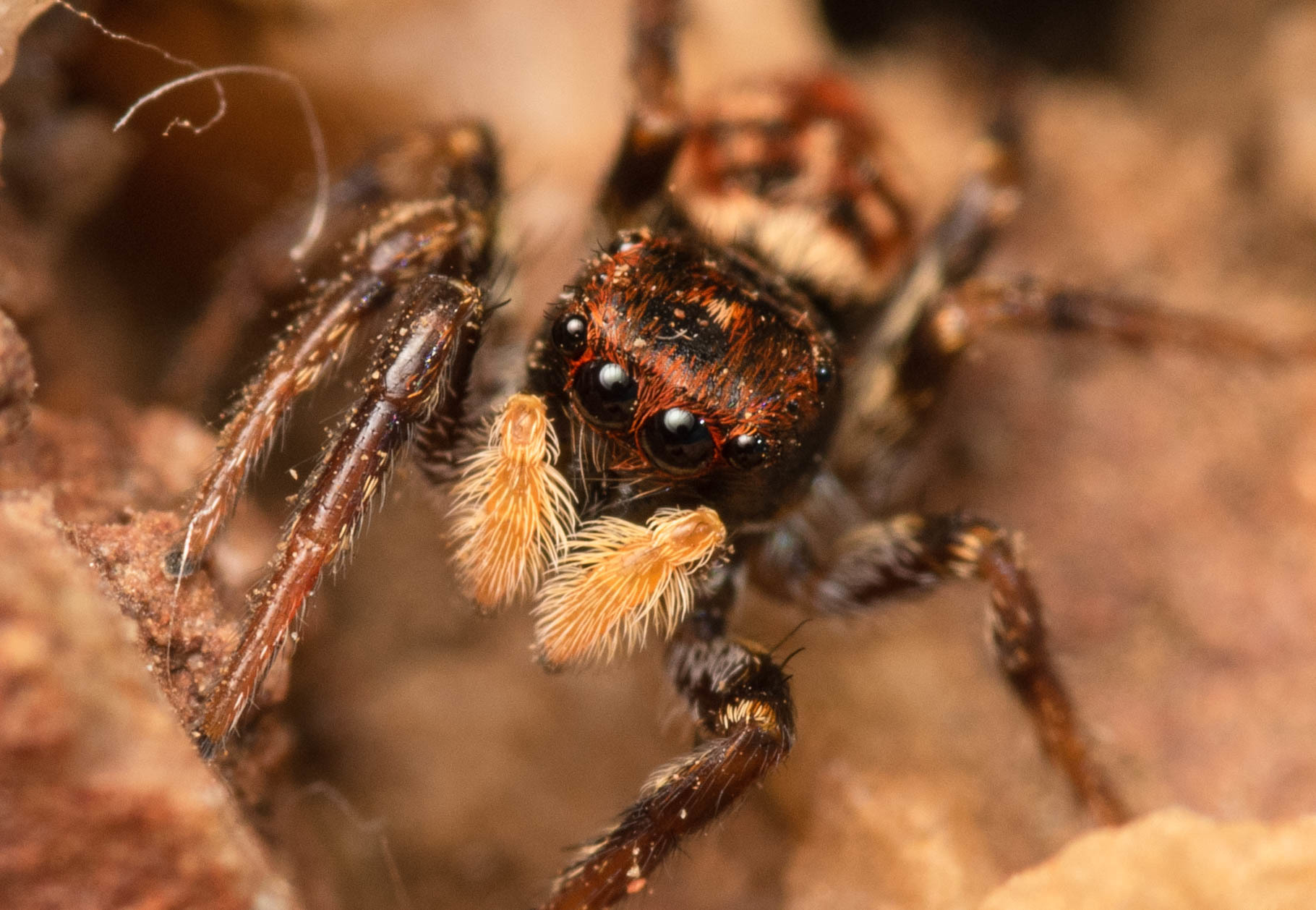

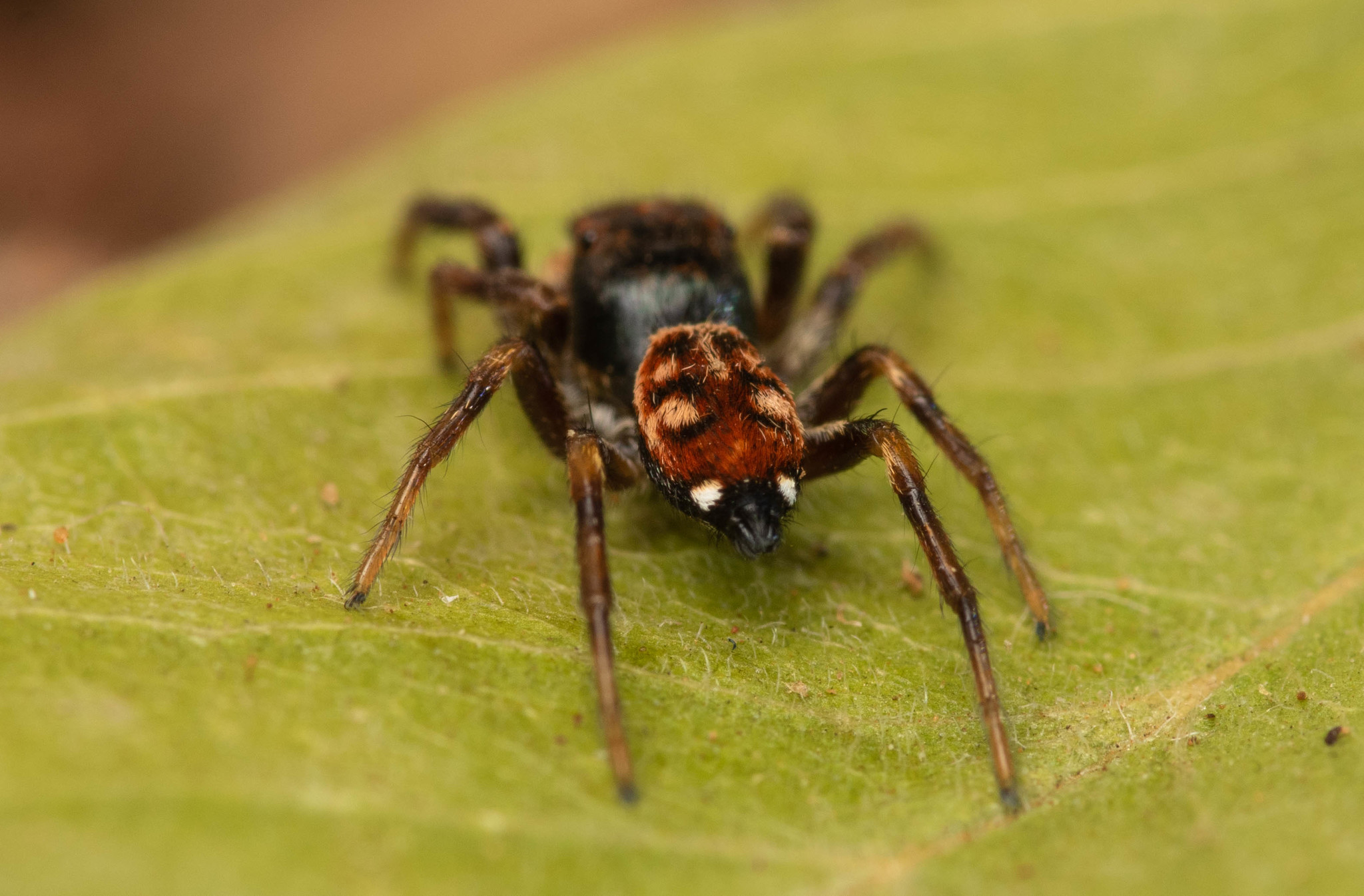

== Conservation ==
Heliocapensis termitophagus is listed as Least Concern due to the wide geographical range of the species. The species has a wide geographical range and is protected in Benfontein Nature Reserve, Erfenis Dam Nature Reserve, and Tussen-die-Riviere Nature Reserve.

== Taxonomy ==
The species is known from both sexes and has a junior synonym Heliocapensis thaleri. The species was transferred to Heliocapensis by Wesołowska in 2024.
