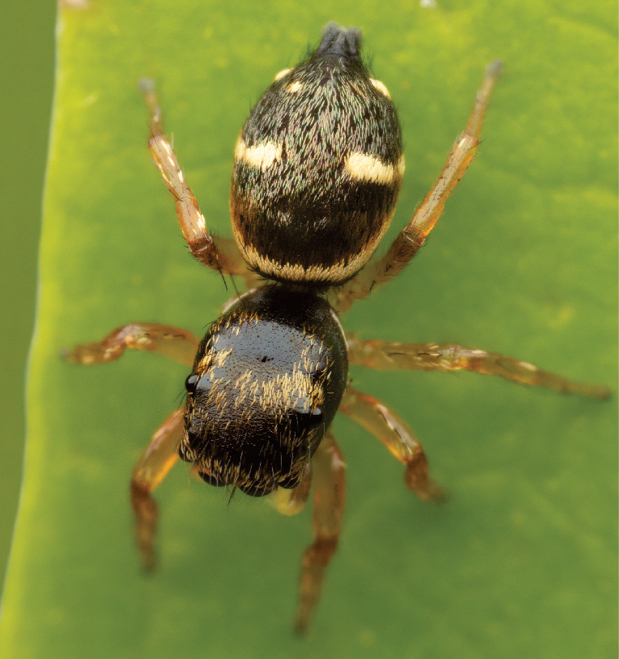

Scientific classification
- Kingdom: Animalia
- Phylum: Arthropoda
- Subphylum: Chelicerata
- Class: Arachnida
- Order: Araneae
- Infraorder: Araneomorphae
- Family: Salticidae
- Genus: Heliocapensis
- Species: H. mirabilis

Binomial name
- Heliocapensis mirabilis (Wesołowska, 1986)

Synonyms
- Heliophanus mirabilis Wesołowska, 1986

= Heliocapensis mirabilis =

Sneeuberg Heliocapensis Sunny Jumping Spider

Species of spider

Heliocapensis mirabilis is a species of jumping spider in the family Salticidae. It is endemic to South Africa and is commonly known as the Sneeuberg Heliocapensis sunny jumping spider.

== Distribution ==
Heliocapensis mirabilis is known from two provinces of South Africa, the Northern Cape and Western Cape. Locations include Richtersveld National Park, Algeria Forest Station, Clanwilliam, Stellenbosch, and Cape Town.

== Habitat and ecology ==
The species is a plant dweller that has been sampled from Fynbos, Desert and Succulent Karoo biomes at altitudes ranging from 78 to 103 m.

== Conservation ==
Heliocapensis mirabilis is listed as Least Concern due to its wide geographical range. There are no known threats, and the species receives protection in Richtersveld National Park.

== Taxonomy ==
The male was described by Wesołowska in 1986 and additional data was provided by Haddad and Wesołowska in 2013. The female was described by Haddad and Wesołowska in 2024.
