= Heliocapensis portentosus =

Tulbagh Heliocapensis Sunny Jumping Spider

Scientific classification
- Kingdom: Animalia
- Phylum: Arthropoda
- Subphylum: Chelicerata
- Class: Arachnida
- Order: Araneae
- Infraorder: Araneomorphae
- Family: Salticidae
- Genus: Heliocapensis
- Species: H. portentosus

Binomial name
- Heliocapensis portentosus (Wesołowska, 1986)

Synonyms
- Heliophanus portentosus Wesołowska, 1986

Species of spider

Heliocapensis portentosus is a species of jumping spider in the family Salticidae. It is endemic to the Western Cape and is commonly known as the Tulbagh Heliocapensis sunny jumping spider.

== Distribution ==
Heliocapensis portentosus is presently known only from the type locality, Tulbagh in the Western Cape.

== Habitat and ecology ==
Heliocapensis portentosus is a plant dweller that has been sampled on plants from the Fynbos Biome at 160 m.

== Conservation ==
Heliocapensis portentosus is listed as Data Deficient for Taxonomic reasons. The status of the species remains obscure, and some more sampling is needed to collect the female and to determine its range.

== Taxonomy ==
The species is known only from the male. It was transferred to Heliocapensis by Wesołowska in 2024.
