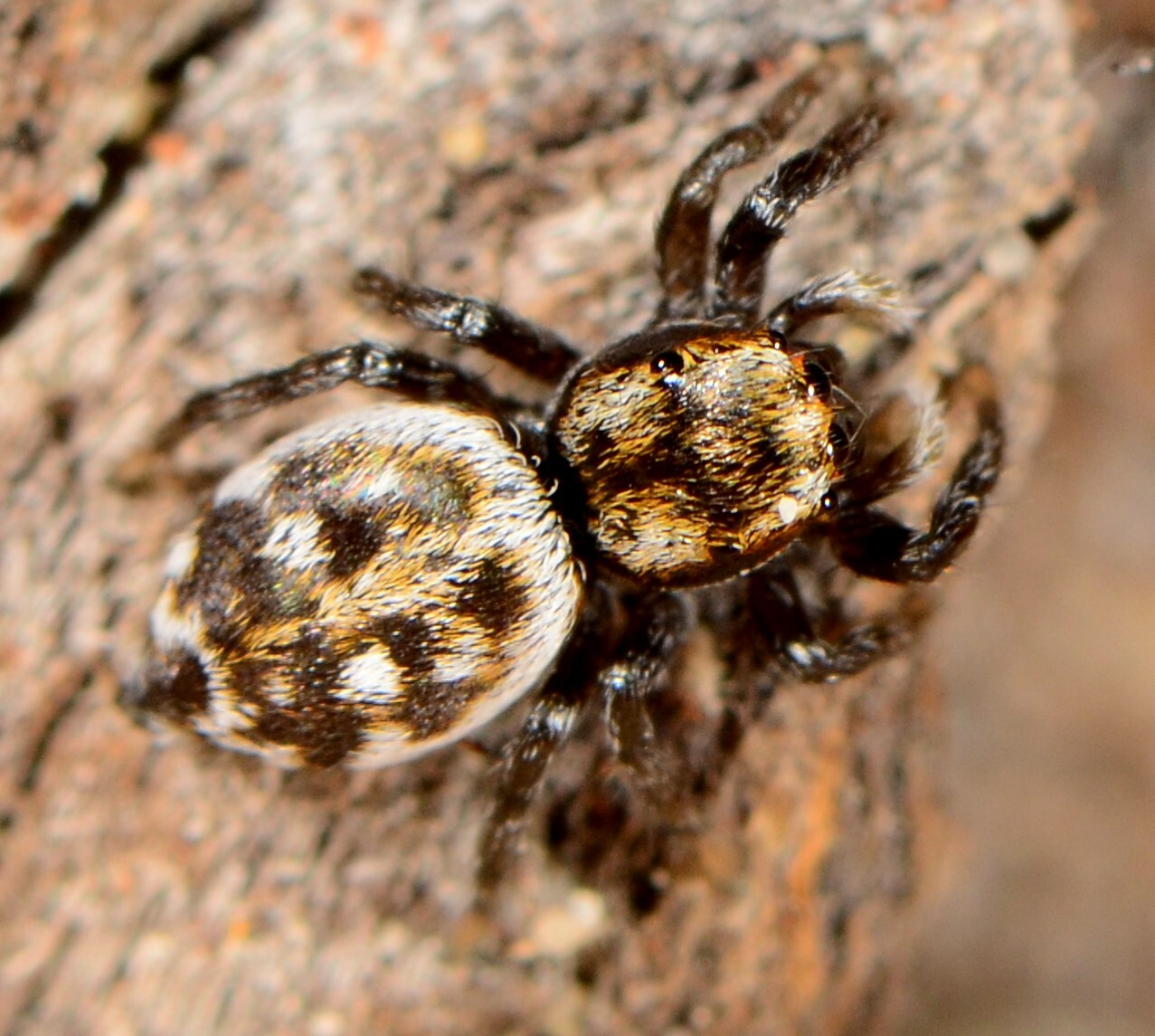
- female
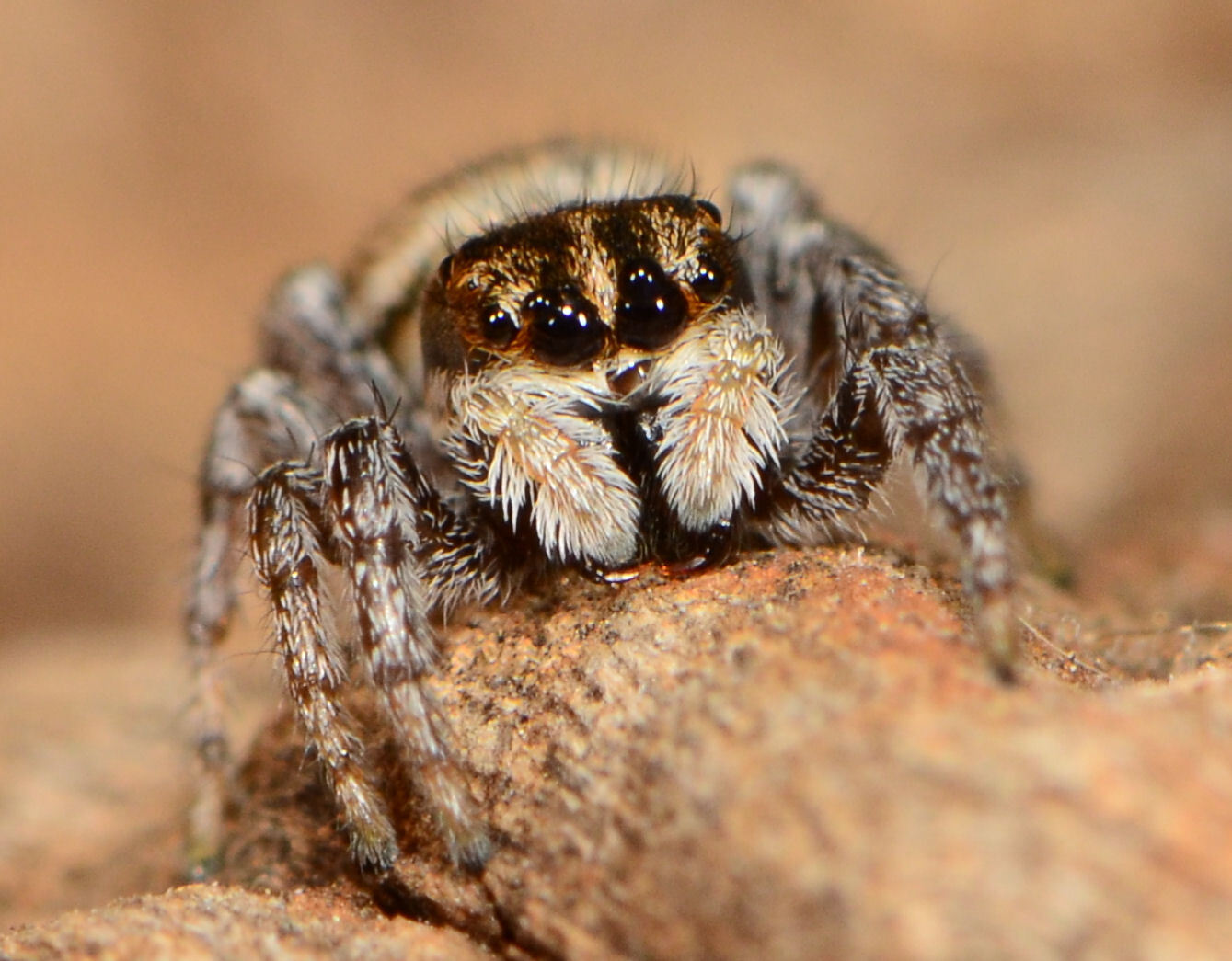
- female

Scientific classification
- Kingdom: Animalia
- Phylum: Arthropoda
- Subphylum: Chelicerata
- Class: Arachnida
- Order: Araneae
- Infraorder: Araneomorphae
- Family: Salticidae
- Genus: Heliocapensis
- Species: H. capensis

Binomial name
- Heliocapensis capensis (Wesołowska, 1986)

= Heliocapensis capensis =

Cape Heliocapensis Sunny Jumping Spider

Species of spider

Heliocapensis capensis is a species of jumping spider in the family Salticidae. It is endemic to South Africa and is commonly known as the Cape Heliocapensis sunny jumping spider.

== Distribution ==
Heliocapensis capensis is found in the Western Cape and Northern Cape provinces of South Africa. The species has been sampled from areas around Cape Town and Clanwilliam, as well as from the Northern Cape. Locations include Cape Town, Clanwilliam, Fernkloof Nature Reserve, Kirstenbosch National Botanical Garden, Stellenbosch, Table Mountain National Park, Nieuwoudtville, and Tankwa Karoo National Park.

== Habitat and ecology ==
These spiders are free living plant-dwellers sampled from the Fynbos Biome at altitudes ranging from 7 to 719 m.

== Description ==
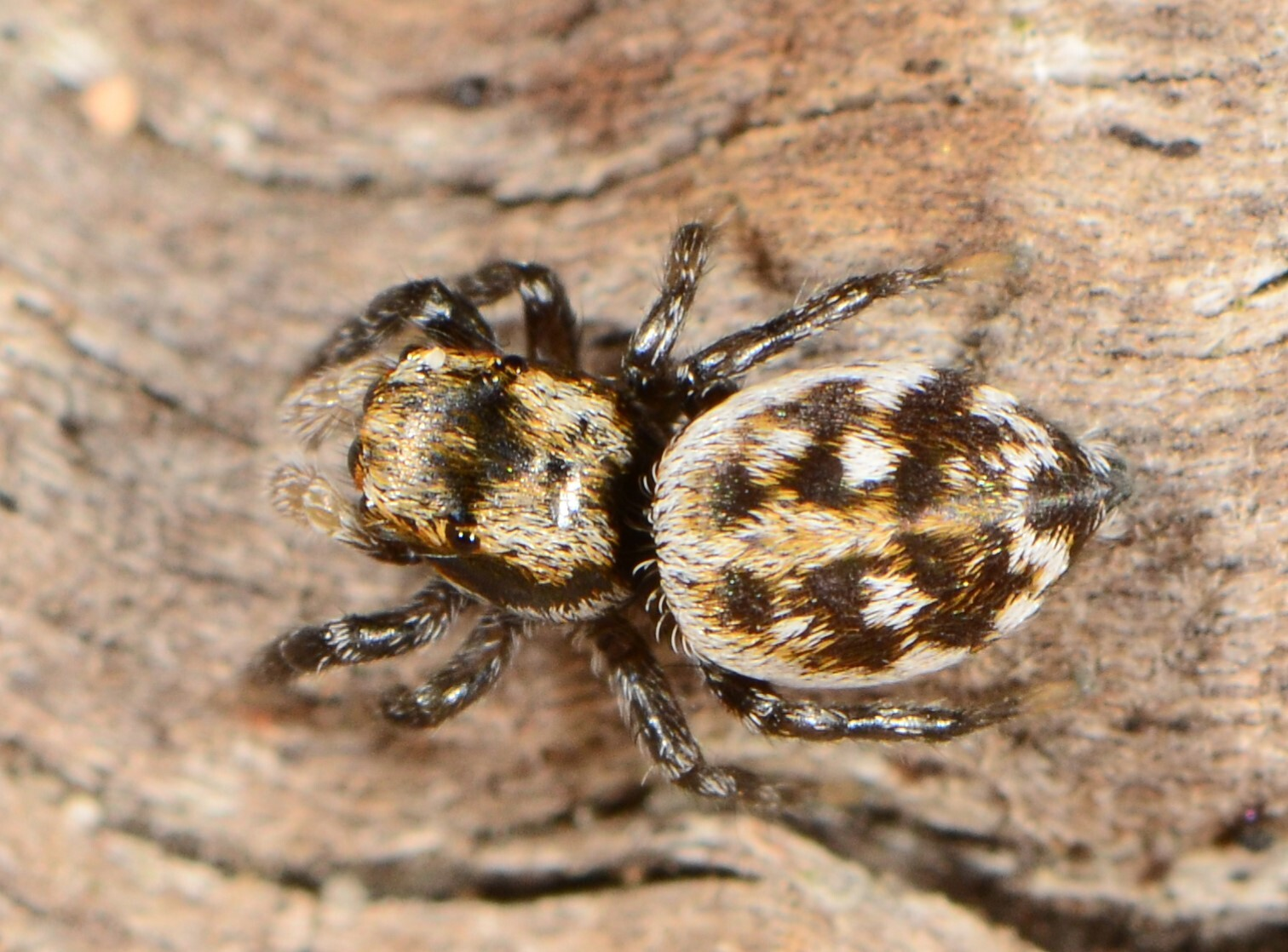
female

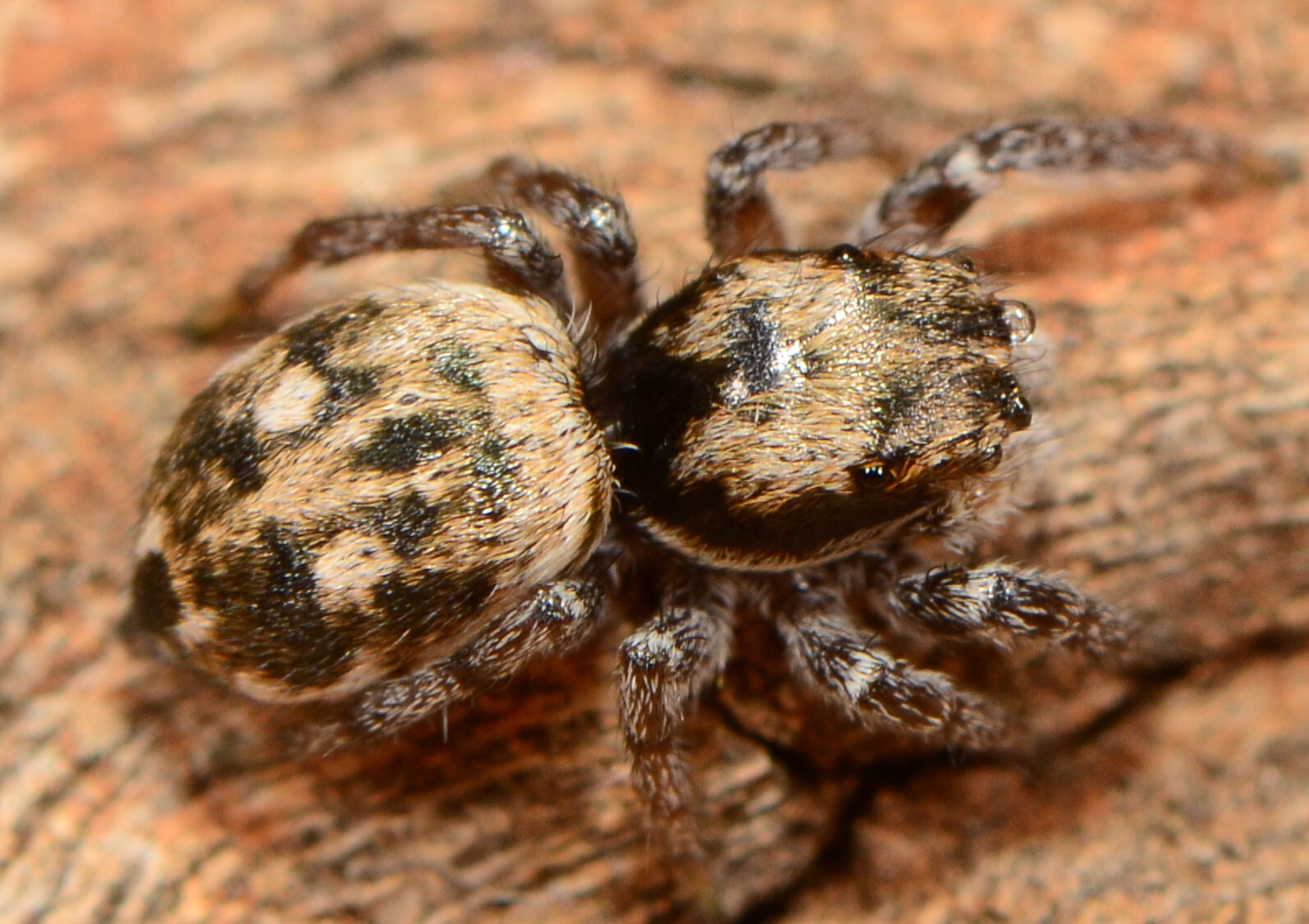
female

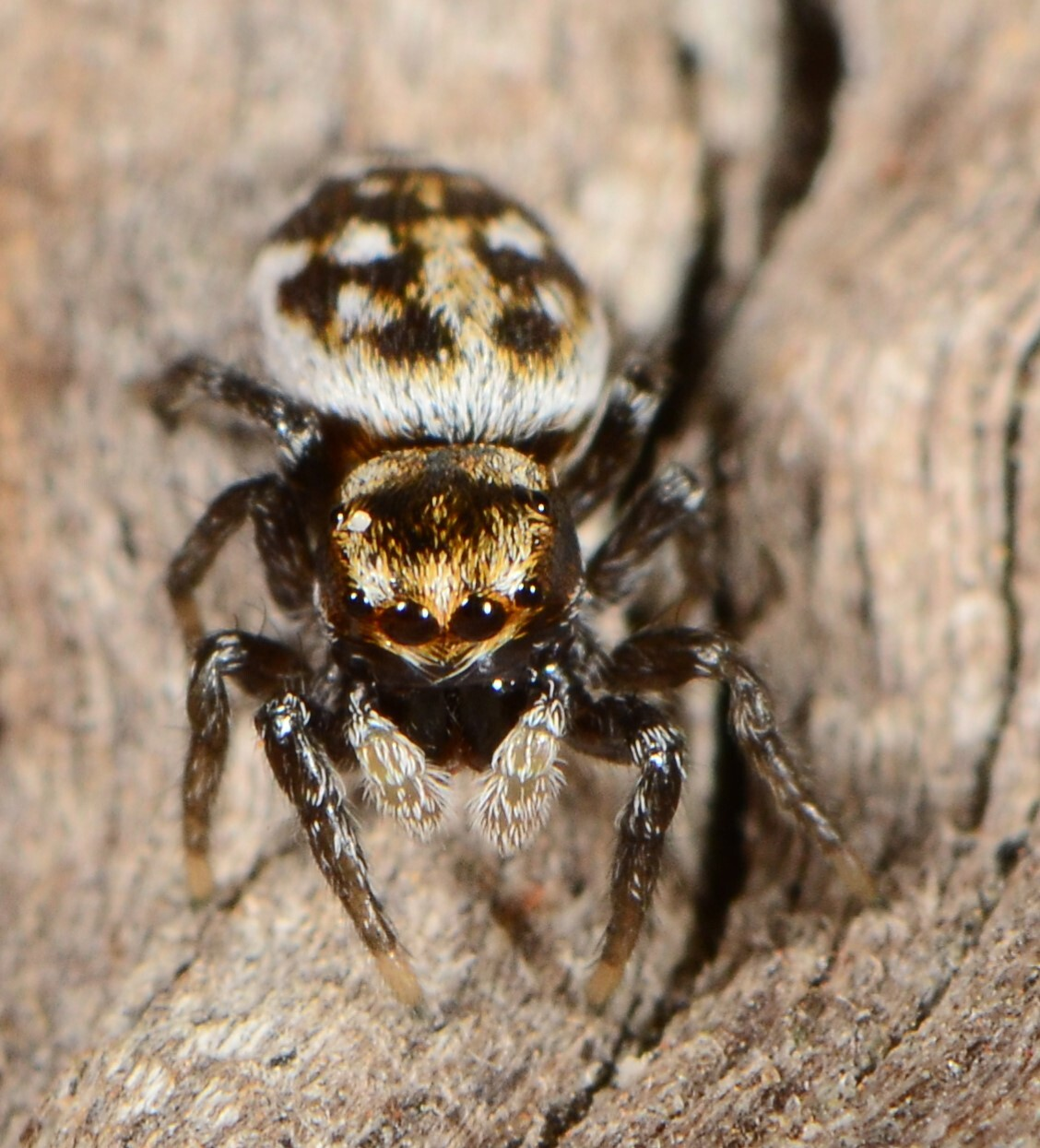
female

== Conservation ==
Heliocapensis capensis is listed as Data Deficient for taxonomic reasons. More sampling is needed to collect the male and determine the species' range. The species is known from a wide range with no known threats and is protected in Table Mountain National Park, Fernkloof Nature Reserve, and Tankwa Karoo National Park.

== Taxonomy ==
The species is known only from the female. It was transferred to Heliocapensis by Wesołowska in 2024. Heliocapensis bellus is likely a synonym and the unknown male of H. capensis, as they were collected from the same locality at the same time.
