= Heliocapensis redimitus =

Kamaggas Heliocapensis Sunny Jumping Spider

Scientific classification
- Kingdom: Animalia
- Phylum: Arthropoda
- Subphylum: Chelicerata
- Class: Arachnida
- Order: Araneae
- Infraorder: Araneomorphae
- Family: Salticidae
- Genus: Heliocapensis
- Species: H. redimitus

Binomial name
- Heliocapensis redimitus (Simon, 1910)

Synonyms
- Heliophanus redimitus Simon, 1910

Species of spider

Heliocapensis redimitus is a species of jumping spider in the family Salticidae. It is endemic to South Africa's Northern Cape and is commonly known as the Kamaggas Heliocapensis sunny jumping spider.

== Distribution ==
Heliocapensis redimitus is known from only the female, and the type locality is Kamaggas in the Northern Cape. The species has also been recorded from Goegap Nature Reserve.

== Habitat and ecology ==
The species is a free living plant-dweller that has been sampled from the Succulent Karoo Biome at 230 m.

== Conservation ==
Heliocapensis redimitus is listed as Data Deficient for Taxonomic reasons. The status of the species remains obscure, and some more sampling is needed to collect the male and to determine its range.

== Taxonomy ==
The species was revised by Wesołowska in 1986 and transferred to Heliocapensis by Wesołowska in 2024.
