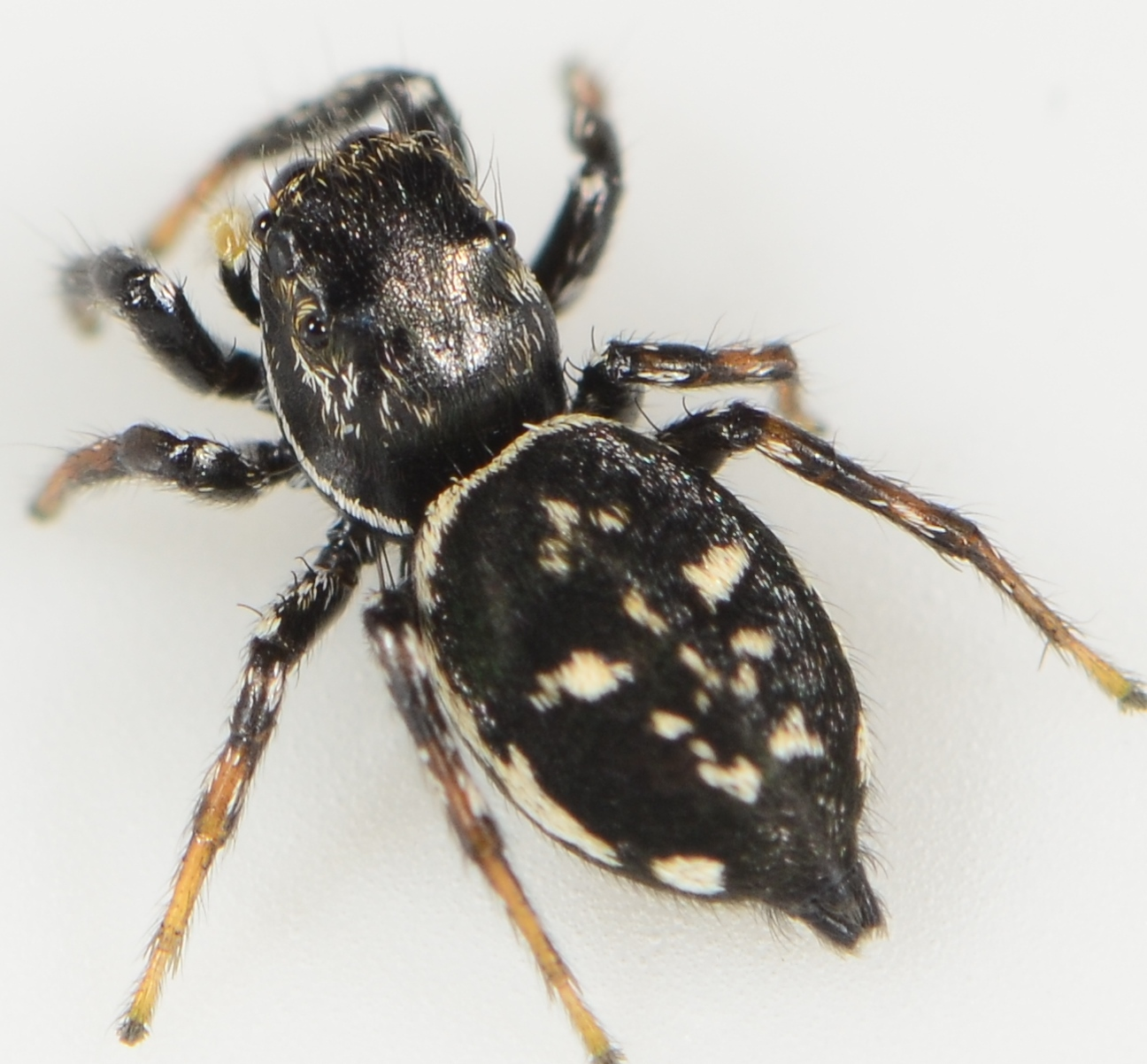
- female
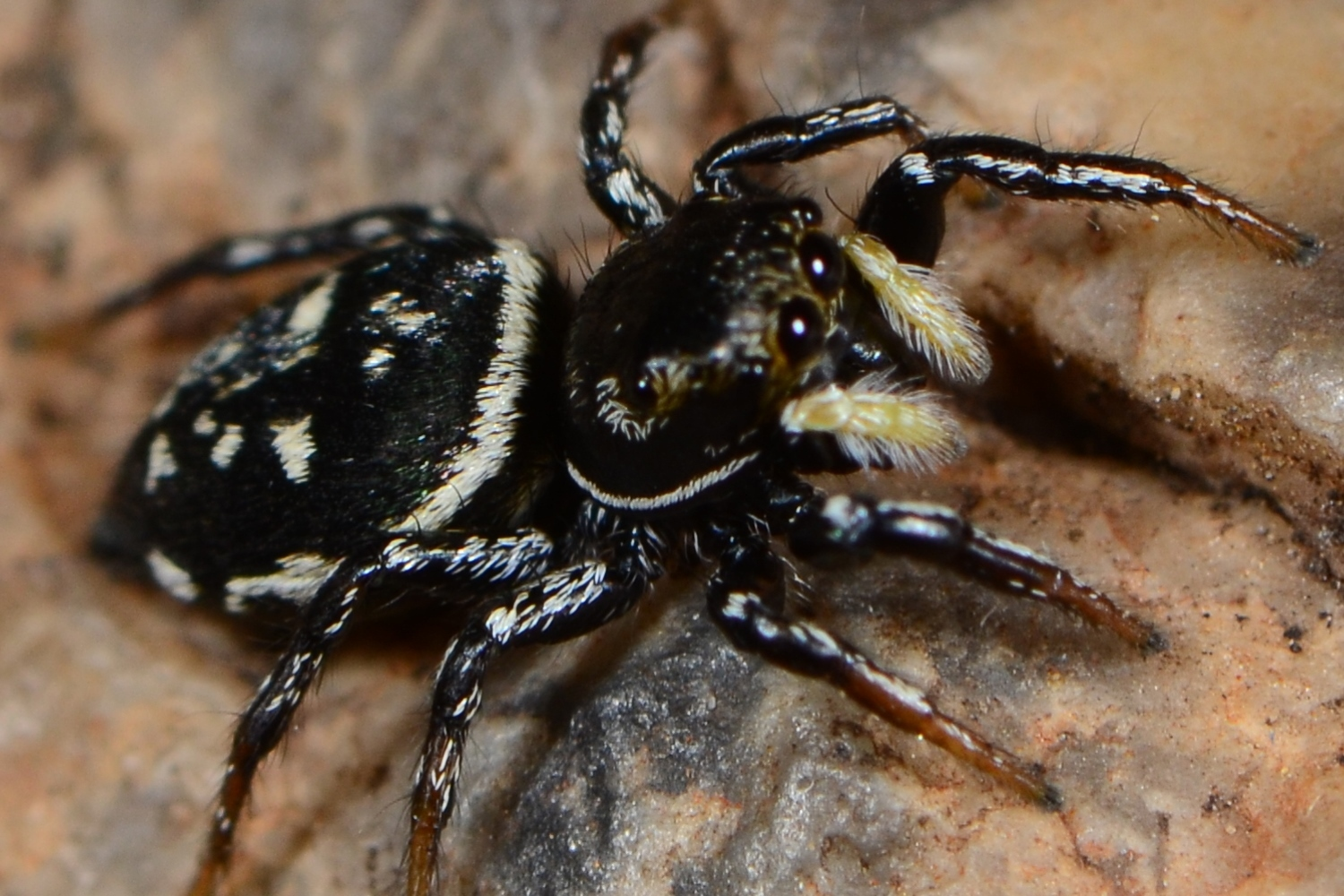
- female

Scientific classification
- Kingdom: Animalia
- Phylum: Arthropoda
- Subphylum: Chelicerata
- Class: Arachnida
- Order: Araneae
- Infraorder: Araneomorphae
- Family: Salticidae
- Genus: Heliocapensis
- Species: H. deserticola

Binomial name
- Heliocapensis deserticola (Simon, 1901)

= Heliocapensis deserticola =

Desert Heliocapensis Sunny Jumping Spider

Species of spider

Heliocapensis deserticola is a species of jumping spider in the family Salticidae. It is endemic to South Africa and is commonly known as the desert Heliocapensis sunny jumping spider.

== Distribution ==
Heliocapensis deserticola is known only from a few localities in three provinces of South Africa including Eastern Cape, Mpumalanga, and Northern Cape. Locations include Cradock, Hogsback, Verloren Vallei Nature Reserve, Dullstroom, De Aar, Goegap Nature Reserve, Nababeep district, and Namaqua National Park.

== Habitat and ecology ==
H. deserticola is a ground and plant dwelling species recorded from the Succulent Karoo and Grassland biomes at altitudes ranging from 881 to 1999 m.

== Description ==
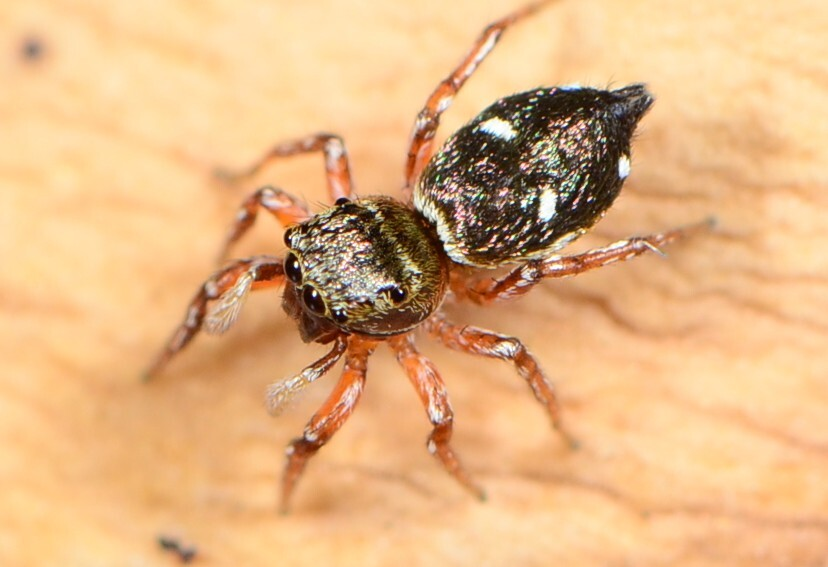
female

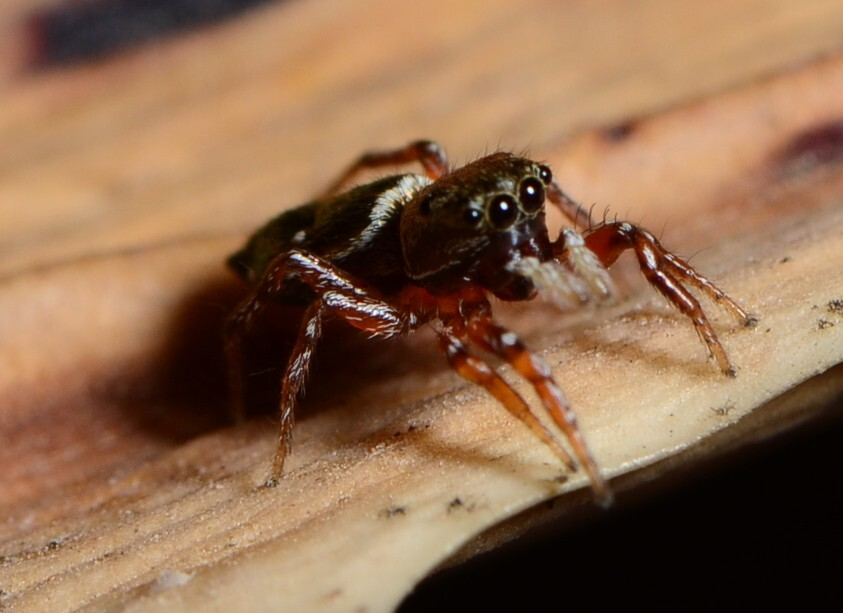
female

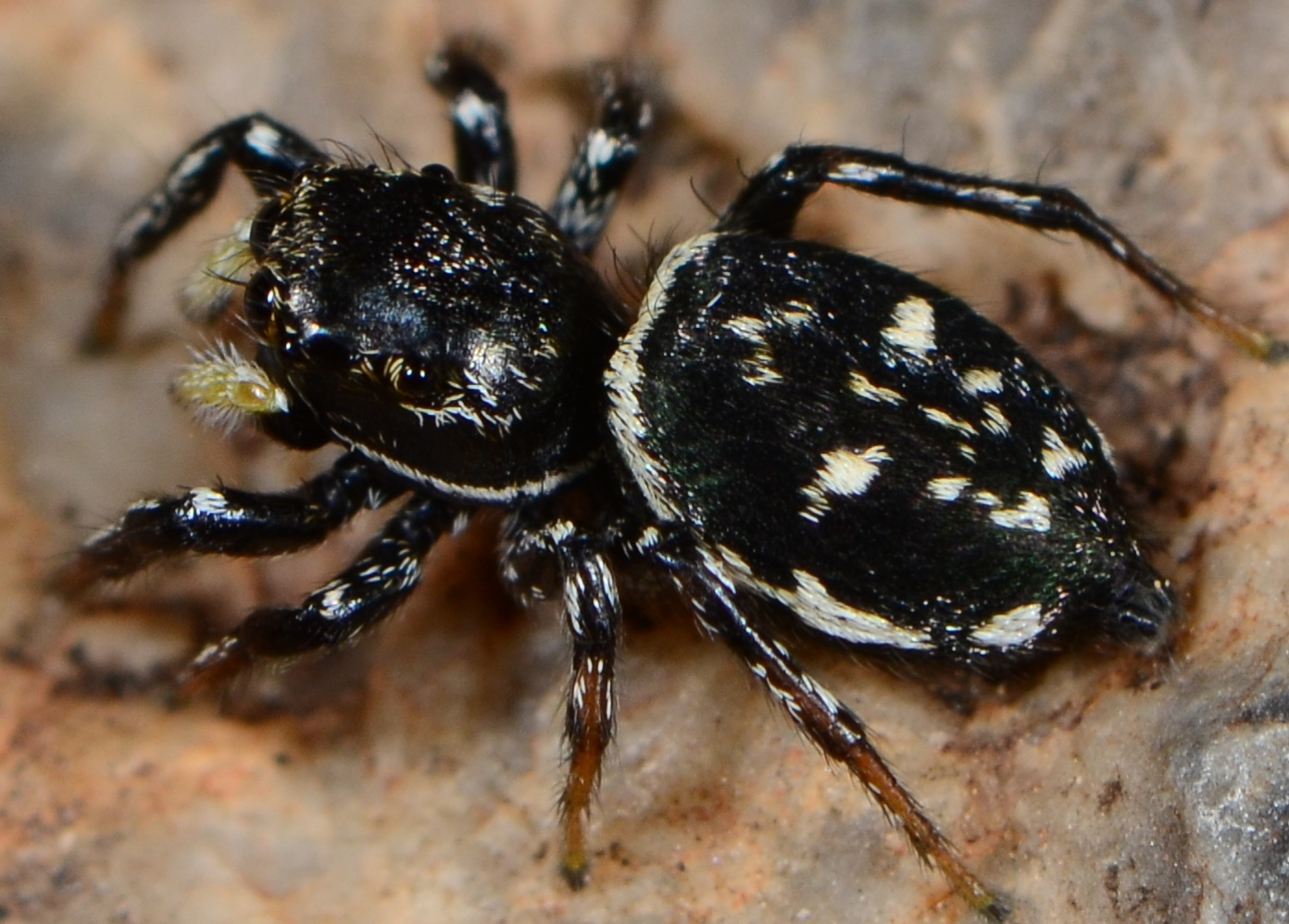
female

== Etymology ==
The species name is Latin for "desert-dwelling".

== Taxonomy ==
The male was described by Simon in 1901 and the female was added by Wesołowska in 1986. The species was transferred to Heliocapensis by Wesołowska in 2024.

== Conservation ==
Heliocapensis deserticola is listed as Least Concern due to its wide geographic range. There are no known threats and the species is protected in Verloren Vallei Nature Reserve and Goegap Nature Reserve.
