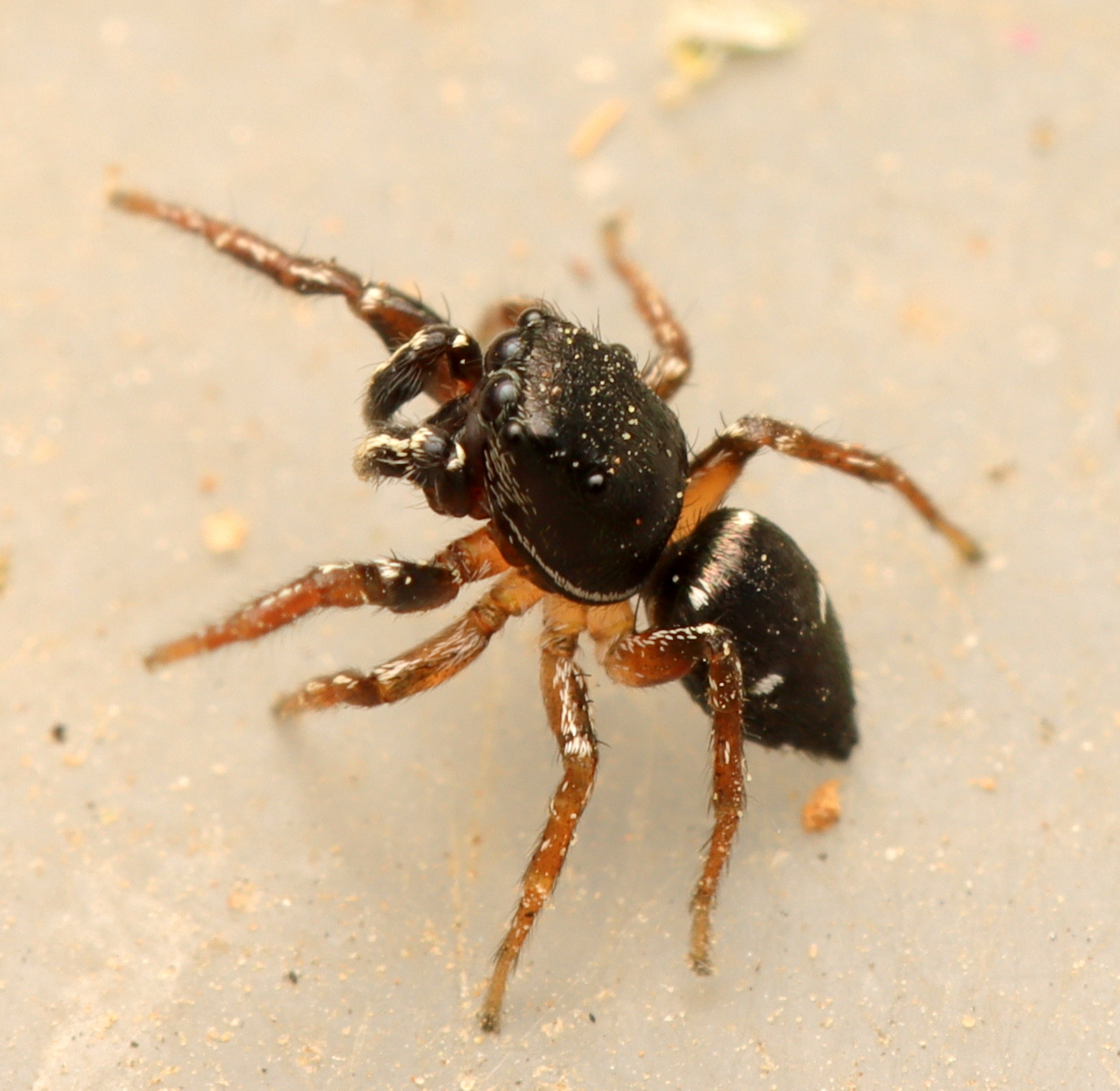

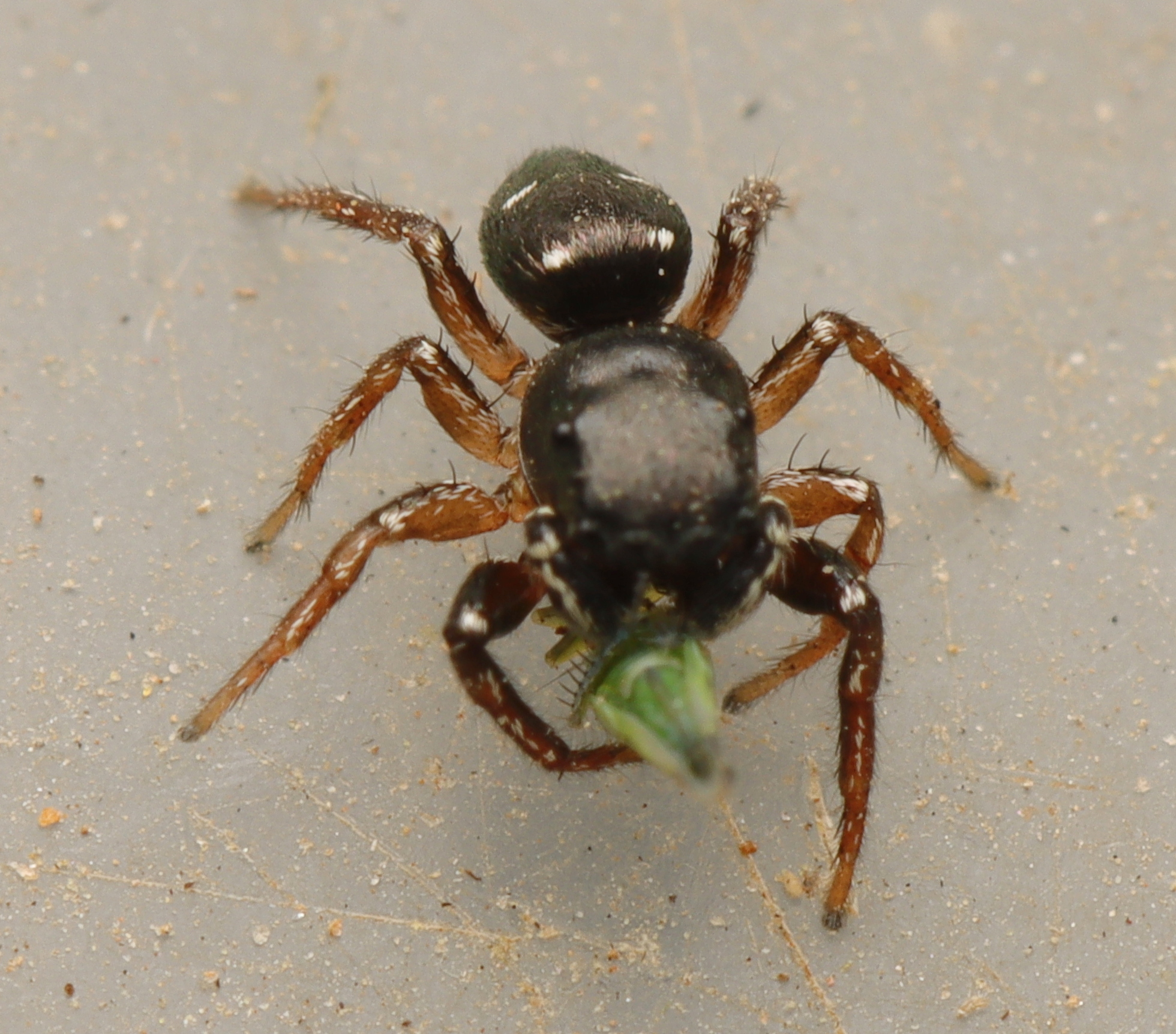

Scientific classification
- Kingdom: Animalia
- Phylum: Arthropoda
- Subphylum: Chelicerata
- Class: Arachnida
- Order: Araneae
- Infraorder: Araneomorphae
- Family: Salticidae
- Genus: Heliocapensis
- Species: H. charlesi

Binomial name
- Heliocapensis charlesi (Wesołowska, 2003)

= Heliocapensis charlesi =

Charles' Heliocapensis Sunny Jumping Spider

Species of spider

Heliocapensis charlesi is a species of jumping spider in the family Salticidae. It is endemic to South Africa and is commonly known as Charles' Heliocapensis sunny jumping spider.

== Distribution ==
Heliocapensis charlesi is found in seven provinces of South Africa including Eastern Cape, Free State, Gauteng, KwaZulu-Natal, Mpumalanga, North West, Northern Cape, and Western Cape.

== Habitat and ecology ==
These are free-living plant dwellers sampled from the Fynbos, Grassland, Thicket and Savanna biomes at altitudes ranging from 459 to 1809 m. The species was also sampled from agro ecosystems such as lucerne and pine plantations and pistachio orchards.

== Conservation ==
Heliocapensis charlesi is listed as Least Concern due to its wide geographical range. Known from a wide range with no known threats, the species is protected in seven protected areas including Suikerbosrand Nature Reserve, Tswalu Game Reserve, Golden Gate Highlands National Park, and Kgaswane Mountain Reserve.

== Taxonomy ==
The species is known from both sexes. It was transferred to Heliocapensis by Wesołowska in 2024.
