= Heliocapensis claviger =

Four-Spotted Heliocapensis Sunny Jumping Spider

Scientific classification
- Kingdom: Animalia
- Phylum: Arthropoda
- Subphylum: Chelicerata
- Class: Arachnida
- Order: Araneae
- Infraorder: Araneomorphae
- Family: Salticidae
- Genus: Heliocapensis
- Species: H. claviger

Binomial name
- Heliocapensis claviger (Simon, 1901)

Species of spider

Heliocapensis claviger is a species of jumping spider in the family Salticidae. It is found in Mozambique and South Africa and is commonly known as the four-spotted Heliocapensis sunny jumping spider.

== Distribution ==
Heliocapensis claviger known from South Africa and Mozambique.

In South Africa, the species is found in KwaZulu-Natal and the Western Cape. Locations include Ndumo Game Reserve, Tembe Elephant Park, Umhlali, De Hoop Nature Reserve, Fernkloof Nature Reserve, Goukamma Nature Reserve, Robben Island, Table Mountain National Park, and coastal areas around Cape Town.

== Habitat and ecology ==
These are free living spiders moving around on vegetation. In KwaZulu Natal, several immature specimens were collected from Vachellia xanthophloea bark.

The species was sampled from leaf litter and low growing foliage in the Fynbos, Forest, Indian Ocean Coastal Belt and Savanna biomes at altitudes ranging from 4 to 125 m.

== Conservation ==
Heliocapensis claviger is listed as Least Concern due to its wide geographical range. Known from a wide range with no known threats, the species is protected in more than six protected areas.

== Taxonomy ==
Both sexes were described by Simon in 1901. Additional data was added by Wesołowska in 1986 and Wesołowska and Haddad in 2009. The species was transferred to Heliocapensis by Wesołowska in 2024.
