= Heliocapensis maluti =

Maluti Heliocapensis Sunny Jumping Spider

Scientific classification
- Kingdom: Animalia
- Phylum: Arthropoda
- Subphylum: Chelicerata
- Class: Arachnida
- Order: Araneae
- Infraorder: Araneomorphae
- Family: Salticidae
- Genus: Heliocapensis
- Species: H. maluti

Binomial name
- Heliocapensis maluti (Wesołowska & Haddad, 2014)

Synonyms
- Heliophanus maluti Wesołowska & Haddad, 2014

Species of spider

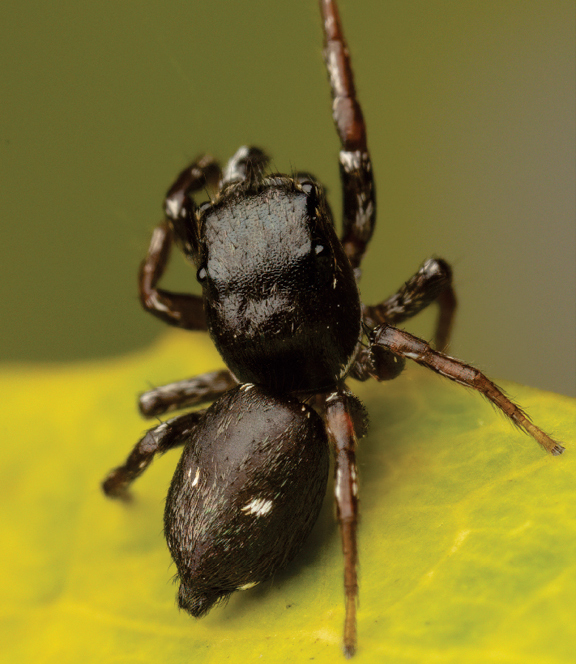
Dorsal habitus of living Heliocapensis maluti (Wesołowska & Haddad), 2014 male

Heliocapensis maluti is a species of jumping spider in the family Salticidae. The species is found in Lesotho and South Africa and is commonly known as the Maluti Heliocapensis sunny jumping spider.

== Distribution ==
Heliocapensis maluti is widespread in central and southern Lesotho and has also been recently recorded from South Africa.

In South Africa, the species is known from the Northern Cape at Namaqua National Park.

== Habitat and ecology ==
The species is a ground dweller that has been collected from under rocks.

== Conservation ==
Heliocapensis maluti is listed as Least Concern due to its wide distribution range. There are no threats to the species, and it is protected in Namaqua National Park.

== Taxonomy ==
The species is known from both sexes and was described from Lesotho in 2014. The species was recently recorded for the first time from South Africa.
