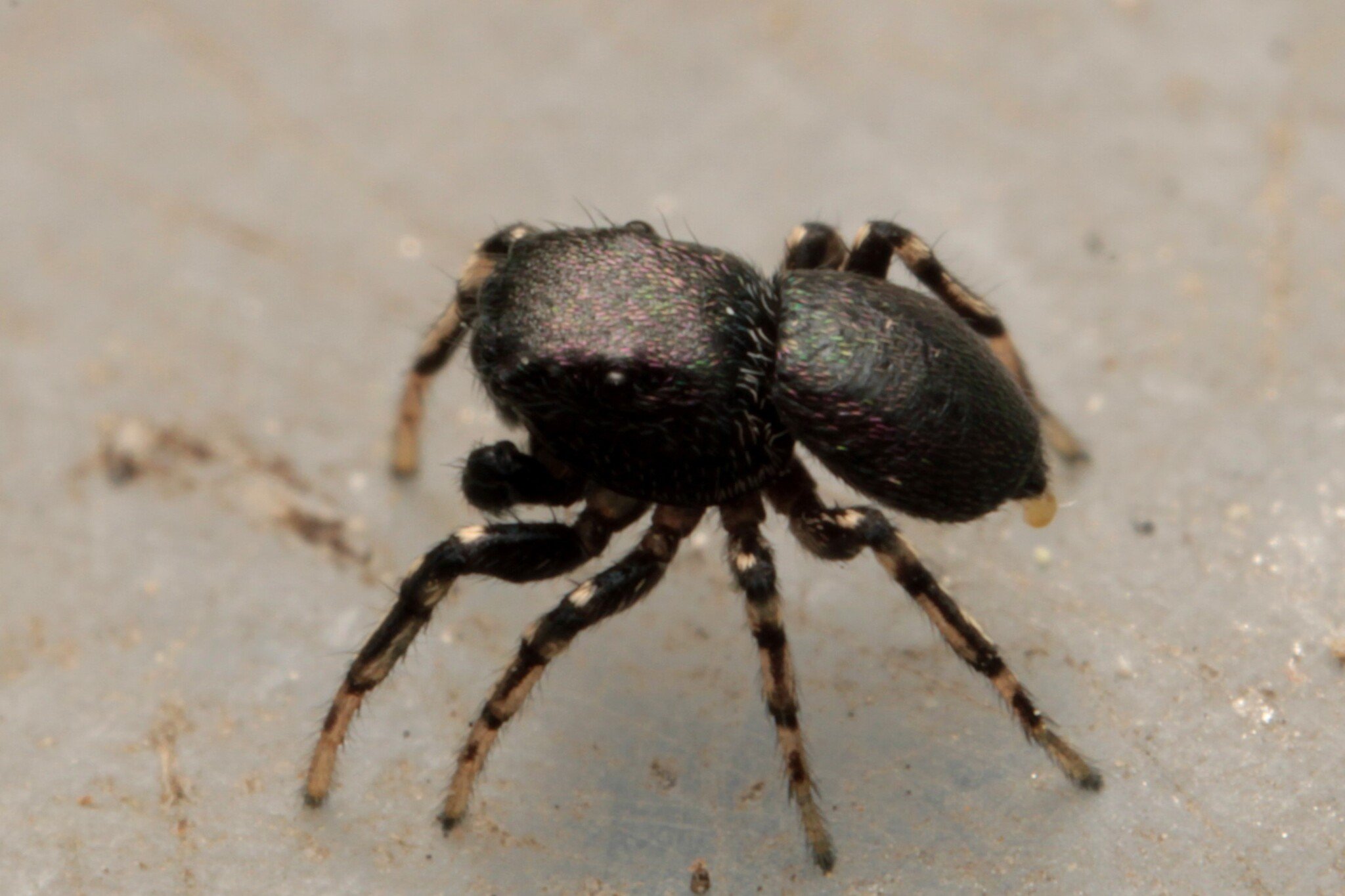

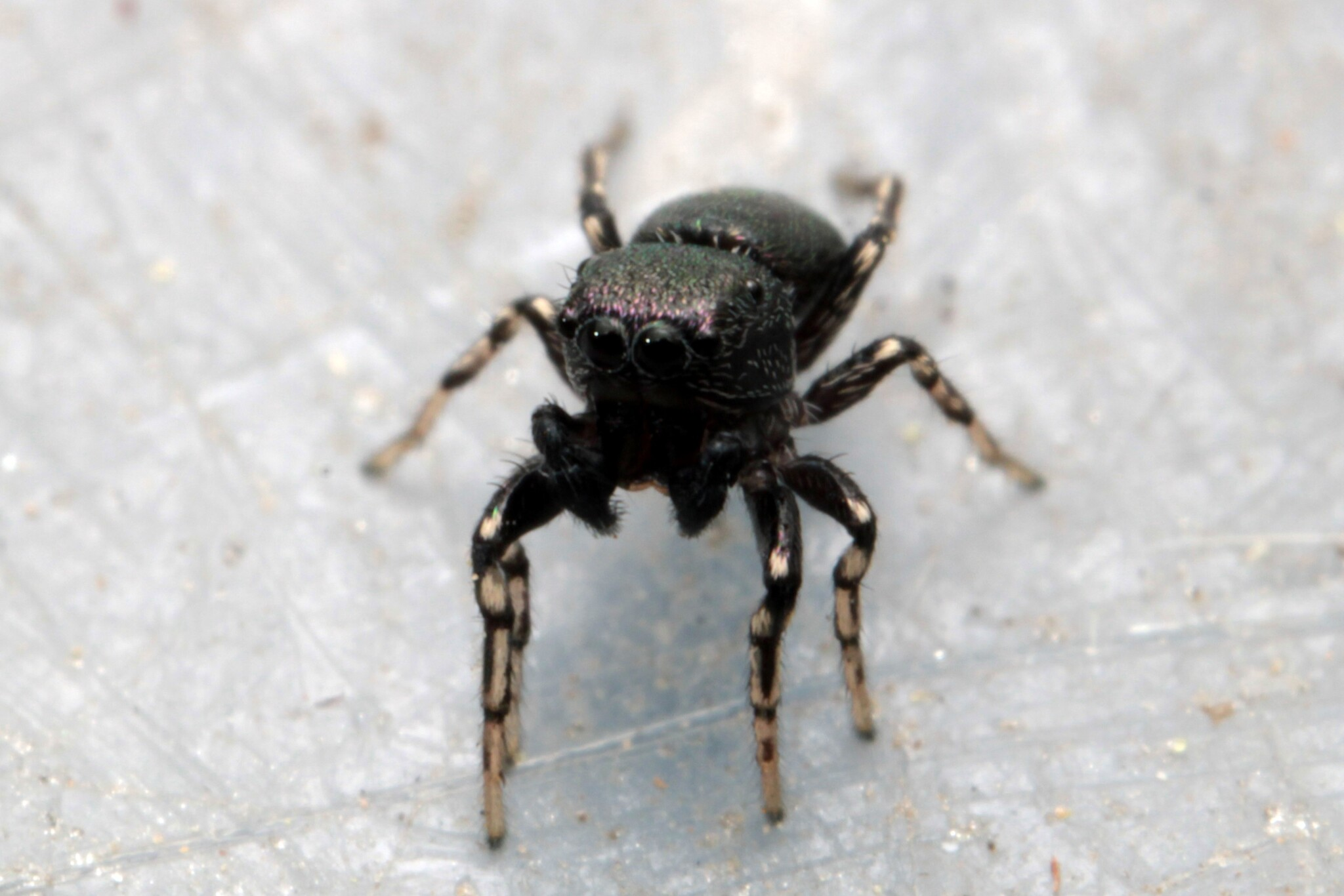

Scientific classification
- Kingdom: Animalia
- Phylum: Arthropoda
- Subphylum: Chelicerata
- Class: Arachnida
- Order: Araneae
- Infraorder: Araneomorphae
- Family: Salticidae
- Genus: Heliocapensis
- Species: H. bellus

Binomial name
- Heliocapensis bellus (Wesołowska, 1986)

Synonyms
- Heliophanus bellus Wesołowska, 1986

= Heliocapensis bellus =

Clanwilliam Heliocapensis Sunny Jumping Spider

Species of spider

Heliocapensis bellus is a species of jumping spider in the family Salticidae. It is endemic to the Western Cape and is commonly known as the Clanwilliam Heliocapensis sunny jumping spider.

== Distribution ==
Heliocapensis bellus is known only from two localities in the Western Cape near Clanwilliam and Darling.

== Habitat and ecology ==
Free living plant dwellers sampled from the Fynbos Biome at 78 m.

== Description ==
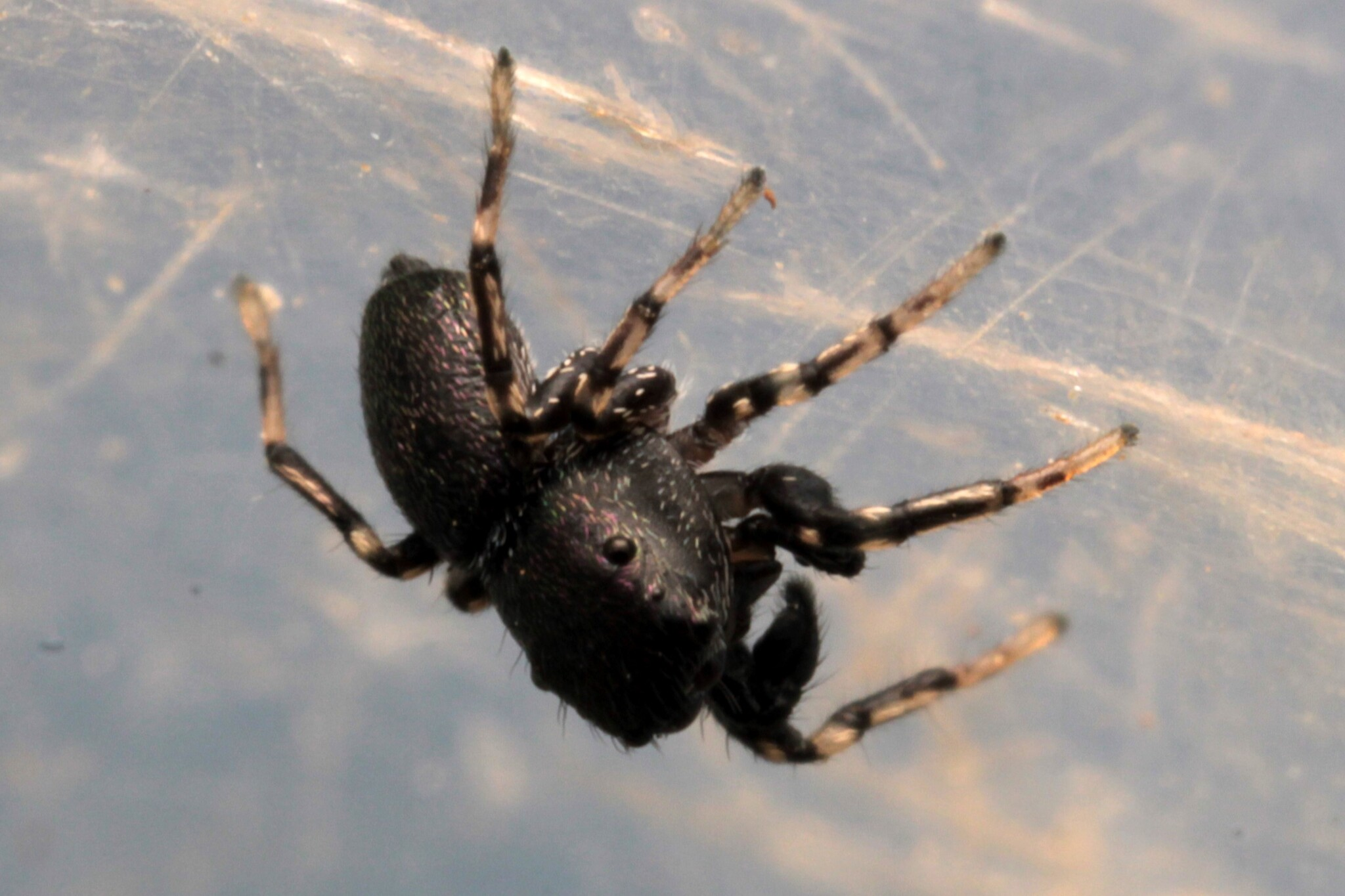

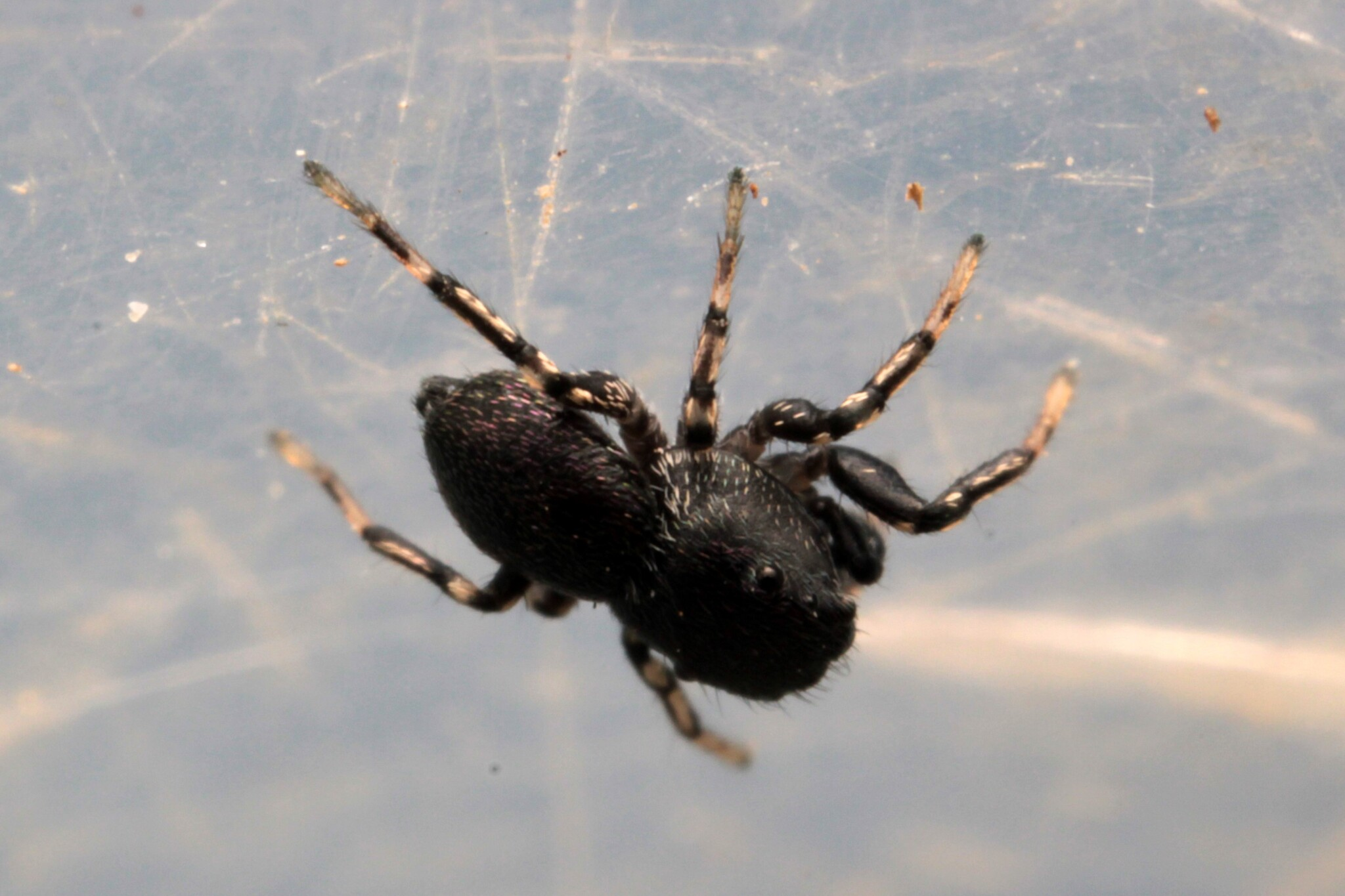

== Conservation ==
Heliocapensis bellus is listed as Data Deficient for Taxonomic reasons due to its small range. Some more sampling is needed to collect the female and determine the species' range.

== Taxonomy ==
The species is known only from the male. It was transferred to Heliocapensis by Wesołowska in 2024. This species is likely a synonym and the unknown male of H. capensis, as they were collected from the same locality at the same time.
