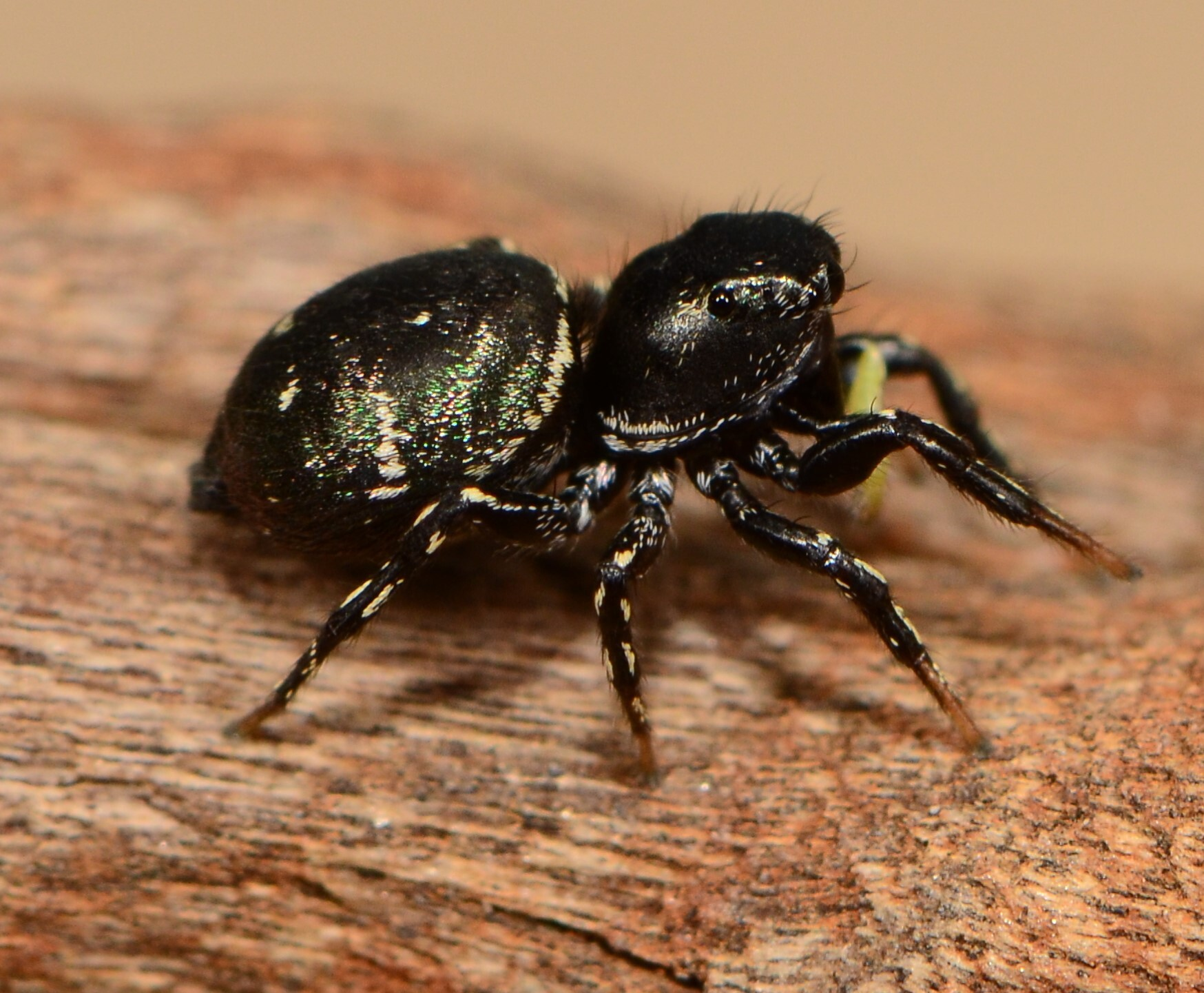
- female
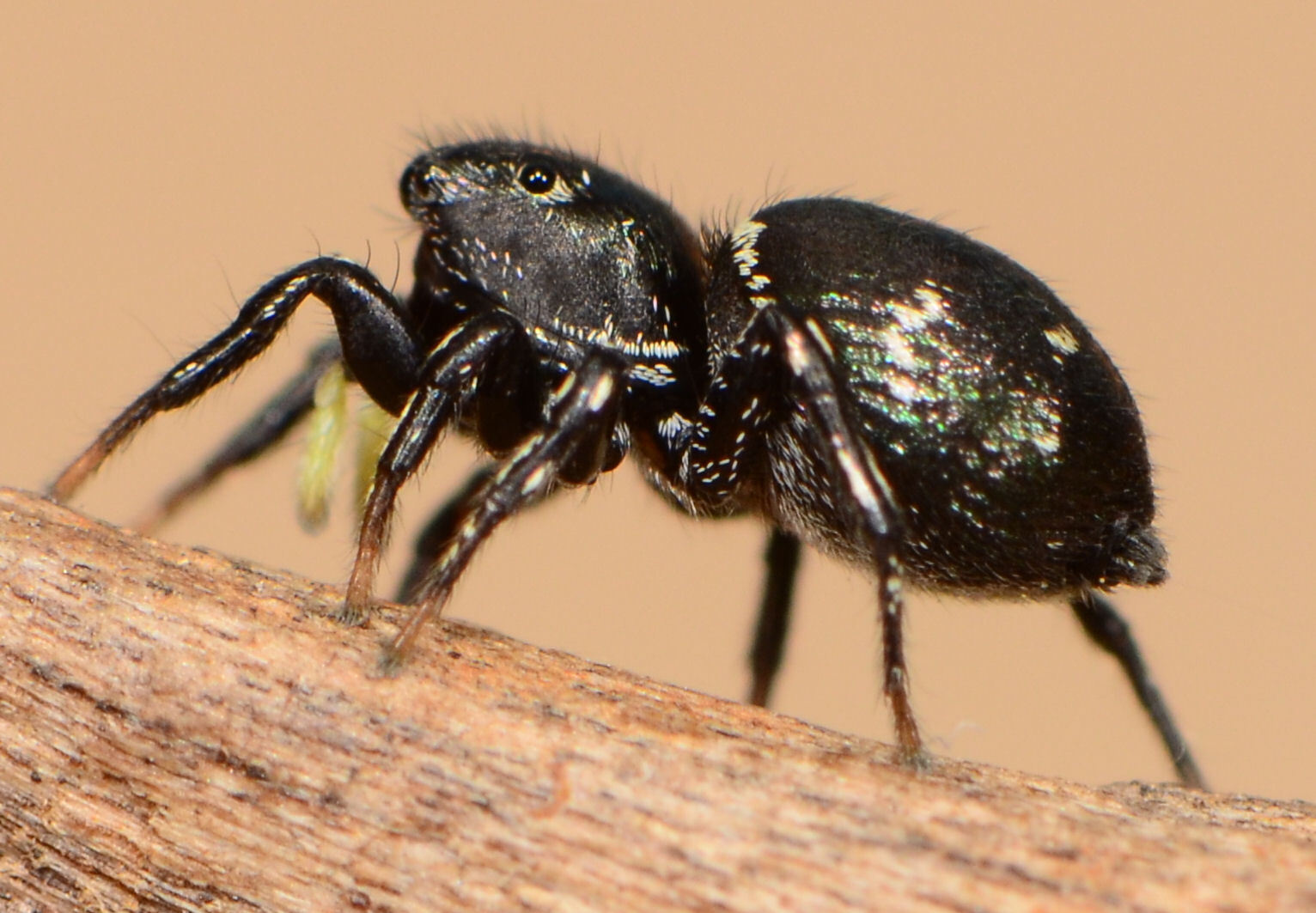
- female

Scientific classification
- Kingdom: Animalia
- Phylum: Arthropoda
- Subphylum: Chelicerata
- Class: Arachnida
- Order: Araneae
- Infraorder: Araneomorphae
- Family: Salticidae
- Genus: Heliocapensis
- Species: H. peckhami

Binomial name
- Heliocapensis peckhami (Simon, 1902)

Synonyms
- Heliophanus peckhami Simon, 1902; Heliophanus beardii Peckham & Peckham, 1903

= Heliocapensis peckhami =

Peckham's Heliocapensis Sunny Jumping Spider

Species of spider

Heliocapensis peckhami is a species of jumping spider in the family Salticidae. It is endemic to the Western Cape and is commonly known as Peckham's Heliocapensis sunny jumping spider.

== Distribution ==
Heliocapensis peckhami is sampled from different localities in the Western Cape including Bergvliet, Camps Bay, Cape Town, Clanwilliam, and Table Mountain National Park.

== Habitat and ecology ==
The species is a free living plant dweller that has been sampled from the Fynbos Biome at altitudes ranging from 7 to 78 m.

== Description ==
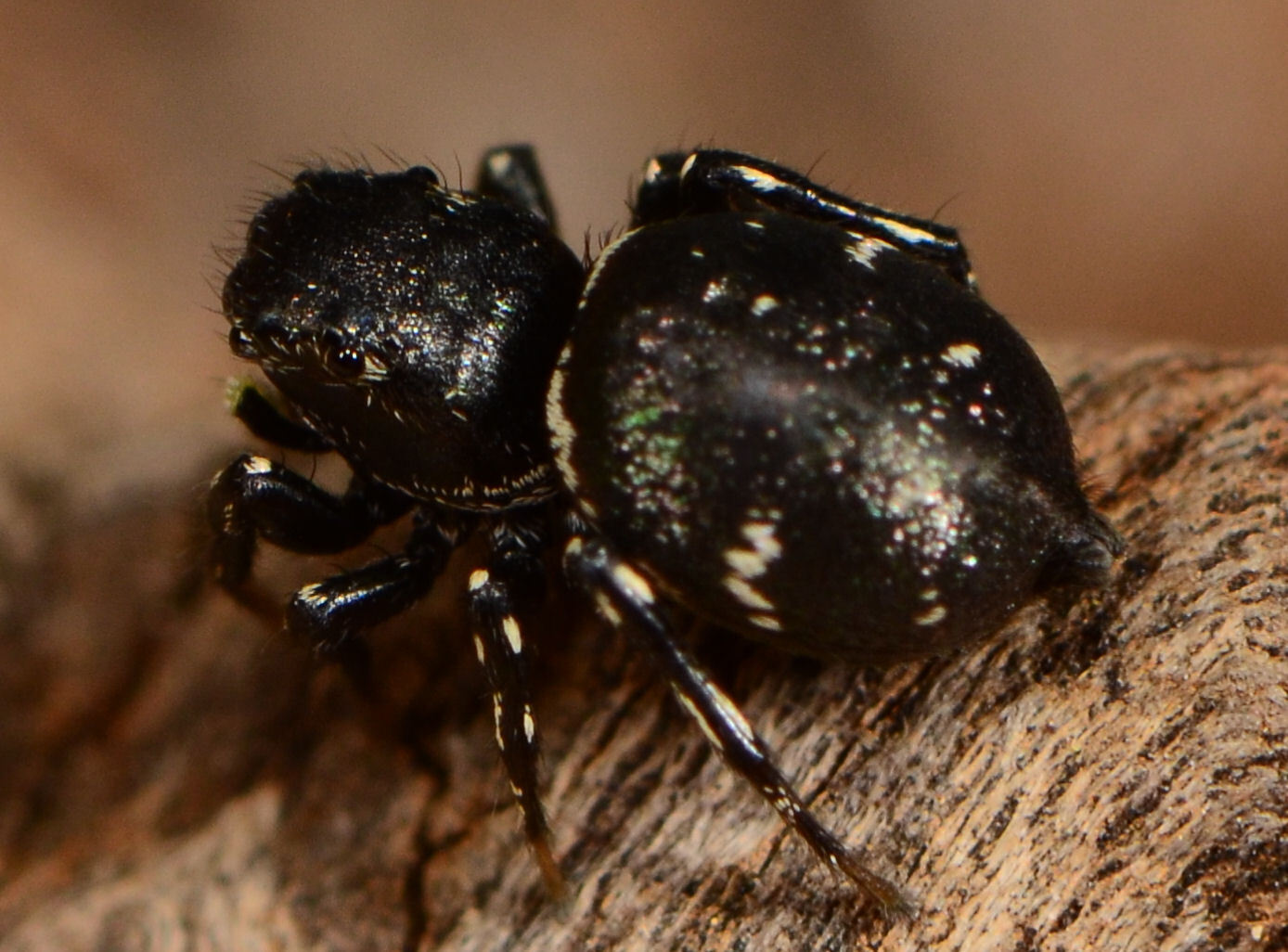
female

== Conservation ==
Heliocapensis peckhami is listed as Data Deficient due to the species having a small restricted distribution range. Some more sampling is needed to determine its range. The species is presently protected in Table Mountain National Park.

== Etymology ==
This species is named after George and Elizabeth Peckham.

== Taxonomy ==
Simon described the male in 1902 and Wesołowska described the female in 1986.
