= List of species named planus =

The species name planus (Latin for "flat" or "plain") occurs frequently in binomial names throughout the taxonomy of life. Examples include:

== Arthropods ==
=== Arachnids (spiders, ticks, and mites) ===
- Cheliferoides planus, a species of spider in the genus Cheliferoides
- Cleptomartus planus, a synonym of Anthracomartus hindi, an extinct species of arachnid in the genus Anthracomartus in the family Anthracomartidae
- Epicadus planus, a species of spider in the genus Epicadus in the family Thomisidae
- Hoplobunus planus, a species of harvestman in the family Stygnopsidae
- Penestomus planus, a species of spider in the genus Penestomus
- Philodromus planus, a species of philodromid crab spider in the genus Philodromus in the family Philodromidae
- Psellonus planus, a species of spider in the genus Psellonus in the family Philodromidae; see List of spiders of India
- Pseudoparasitus planus, a species of mite in the genus Pseudoparasitus
- Pyrnus planus, a species of spider in the genus Pyrnus in the family Trochanteriidae
- Rhipicephalus planus, a species of tick in the genus Rhipicephalus in the family Ixodidae
- Senoculus planus, a species of spider in the genus Senoculus in the family Senoculidae
- Trachelas planus, a species of spider in the genus Trachelas in the family Trachelidae

=== Insects ===
==== Beetles ====
- Agrypnus planus, a click beetle in the genus Agrypnus
- Aneflus planus, in the family Cerambycidae
- Brachys planus, in the genus Brachys in the family Buprestidae
- Brochocoleus planus, in the genus Brochocoleus in the family Ommatidae
- Canthyporus planus, in the genus Canthyporus in the family Dytiscidae
- Carabus perrini planus, in the family Carabidae
- Carabus planus, a synonym of Pheropsophus aequinoctialis, a ground beetle
- Catogenus planus, in the genus Catogenus in the family Passandridae
- Dermestes planus, in the genus Dermestes in the family Dermestidae
- Distichus planus, in the genus Distichus in the family Carabidae
- Gonicoelus planus, in the genus Gonicoelus in the family Biphyllidae
- Grynobius planus, in the family Anobiidae
- Hydroporus planus, a water beetle in the genus Hydroporus
- Leptotrachelus planus, in the genus Leptotrachelus in the family Carabidae
- Lionychus planus, in the genus Lionychus in the family Carabidae
- Oesyperus planus, in the genus Oesyperus in the family Carabidae
- Pachyscelus planus, in the genus Pachyscelus in the family Buprestidae
- Philophlaeus planus, in the genus Philophlaeus in the family Carabidae
- Protorabus planus, in the subfamily Protorabinae in the family Carabidae
- Pterostichus planus, a ground beetle in the genus Pterostichus

==== Other insects ====
- Blissus planus, a species of true bug in the genus Blissus in the family Blissidae
- Camponotus planus, a species of carpenter ant; see List of Camponotus species
- Coccophagus planus, a species of chalcid wasp in the genus Coccophagus
- Larinus planus, a species of true weevil
- Smerinthus planus, The oriental eyed hawkmoth, a moth of the family Sphingidae
- Wilcoxius planus, a species of robber fly (or, assassin fly) in the genus Wilcoxius in the family Asilidae; see List of Asilidae species: W

=== Other arthropods ===
- Leptodius planus, a species of crab in the genus Leptodius in the family Xanthidae
- Metacyclops planus, a species of copepod crustacean in the genus Metacyclops in the family Cyclopidae
- Polydesmus planus, a species of millipede in the genus Polydesmus
- Styloniscus planus, a species of woodlouse in the genus Styloniscus

== Mollusca ==
- Craspedites planus, an extinct species of ammonoid cephalopod in the genus Craspedites
- Pseudaspidites planus, an extinct species of mollusc in the genus Pseudaspidites; see 2012 in molluscan paleontology
- Sigaretornus planus, a species in the genus Tornus (gastropod)
- Tornus planus, a synonym of Sigaretornus planus
- Trochus planus, a synonym of Bembicium nanum, a species of sea snail

== Plants ==
- Heteroscyphus planus, a species of Marchantiophyta (liverwort)
- Pandanus planus, a synonym of Pandanus tectorius, a species of screwpine
- Syngonanthus planus, a species of plant in the genus Syngonanthus in the family Eriocaulaceae

== Vertebrates ==
=== Birds ===
- Caracara planus, the crested caracara (also known as the carancho), a bird of prey in the family Falconidae
- Palaeospheniscus planus, incorrect name for the extinct species of penguin Palaeospheniscus bergi
- Pseudospheniscus planus, incorrect name for the extinct species of penguin Palaeospheniscus bergi

=== Mammals ===
- Bransatoglis planus, an extinct species of dormouse
- Eucastor planus, an extinct species of beaver found in the Hawthorn Group

=== Sharks and other cartilaginous fish ===
- Copodus planus, an extinct species of cartilaginous fish; see List of prehistoric cartilaginous fish genera
- Corax planus, an extinct species of shark in Corax (genus)
- Ischyodus planus, an extinct species of cartilaginous fish in the genus Ischyodus
- Isurus planus, also known as the hook-tooth mako, an extinct mako shark that lived during the Miocene epoch
- Sphenodus planus, an extinct species of shark in the genus Sphenodus in the family Orthacodontidae

=== Other vertebrates ===
- Callionymus planus, a species of dragonet native to the shallow Pacific waters off southern Japan
- Dicynodon planus, a synonym of Oudenodon bainii, an extinct dicynodont in the genus Oudenodon
- Ferganosuchus planus, the type species of Ferganosuchus, an extinct genus of gavialid crocodilian

== Other species ==
- Argopatagus planus, a species of sea urchin of the family Macropneustidae
- Botrylloides planus, a synonym of Botryllus planus, a sea squirt
- Botryllus planus, a species of colonial ascidian tunicate in the genus Botryllus in the family Styelidae
- Hyalodiscus planus, a species of diatom in the genus Hyalodiscus
- Microcosmus planus, a species of Microcosmus, a genus of tunicates in the family Pyuridae
- Vetustodermis planus, a soft-bodied middle Cambrian animal, a species in the genus Vetustovermis
