= Perrini =

Perrini may refer to:

- Californosaurus perrini, an ichthyosaur, an extinct marine reptile, lived in California
- Carabus perrini, a species of beetle in the family Carabidae
- Carabus perrini perrini, a species of beetle in the family Carabidae
- Carabus perrini planus, a subspecies of black-coloured beetle in the family Carabidae
- Mesoplodon perrini, the newest species of beaked whale to be described
- Phytoecia astarte perrini, a species of beetle in the family Cerambycidae

== See also ==
- Pierini (disambiguation)
