= Trachelas oreophilus =

Scientific classification
- Kingdom: Animalia
- Phylum: Arthropoda
- Subphylum: Chelicerata
- Class: Arachnida
- Order: Araneae
- Infraorder: Araneomorphae
- Family: Trachelidae
- Genus: Trachelas
- Species: T. oreophilus

Binomial name
- Trachelas oreophilus Simon, 1906

Species of spider

Trachelas oreophilus is a species of spiders of the genus Trachelas. It is native to India and Sri Lanka.
