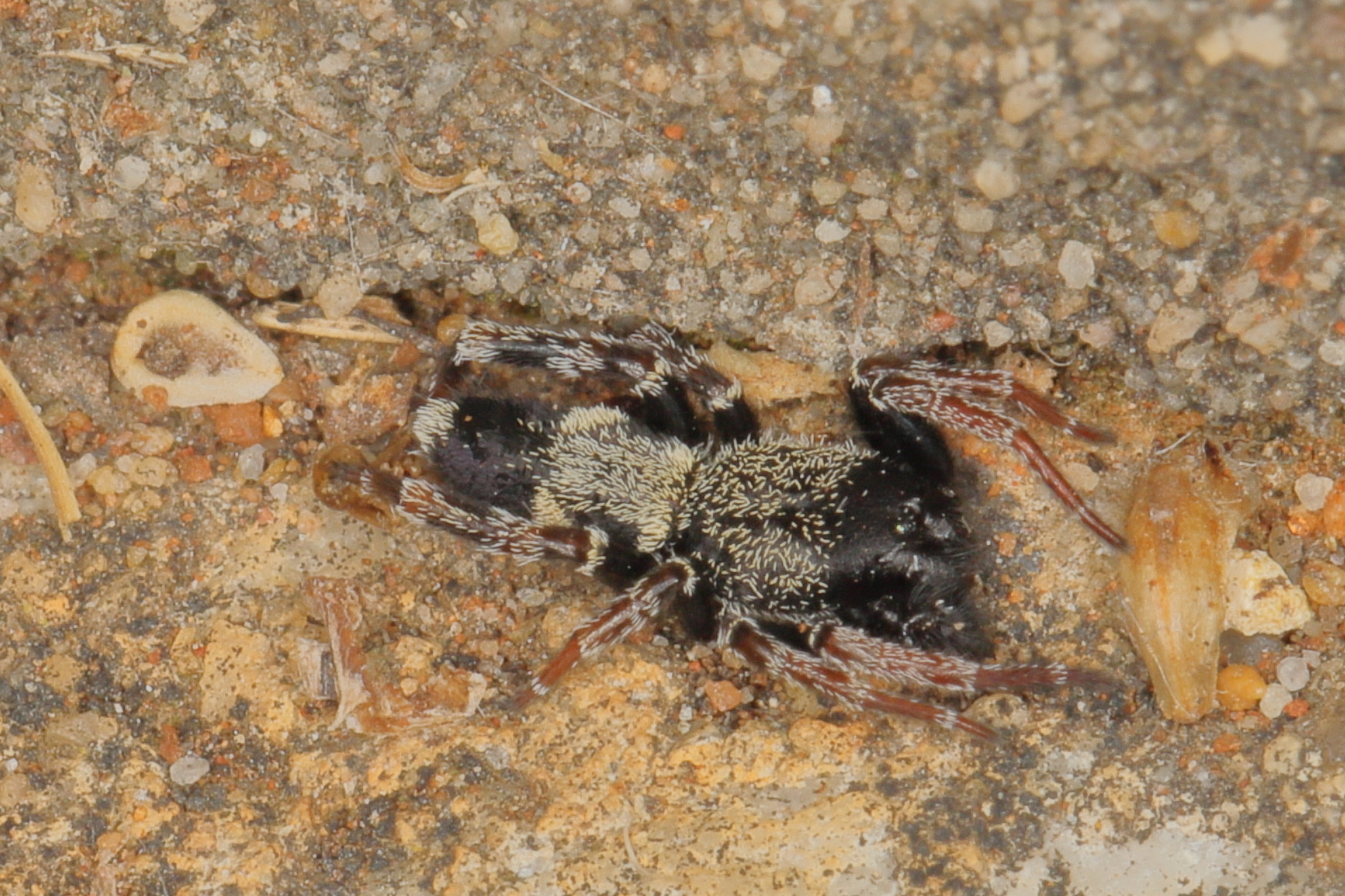

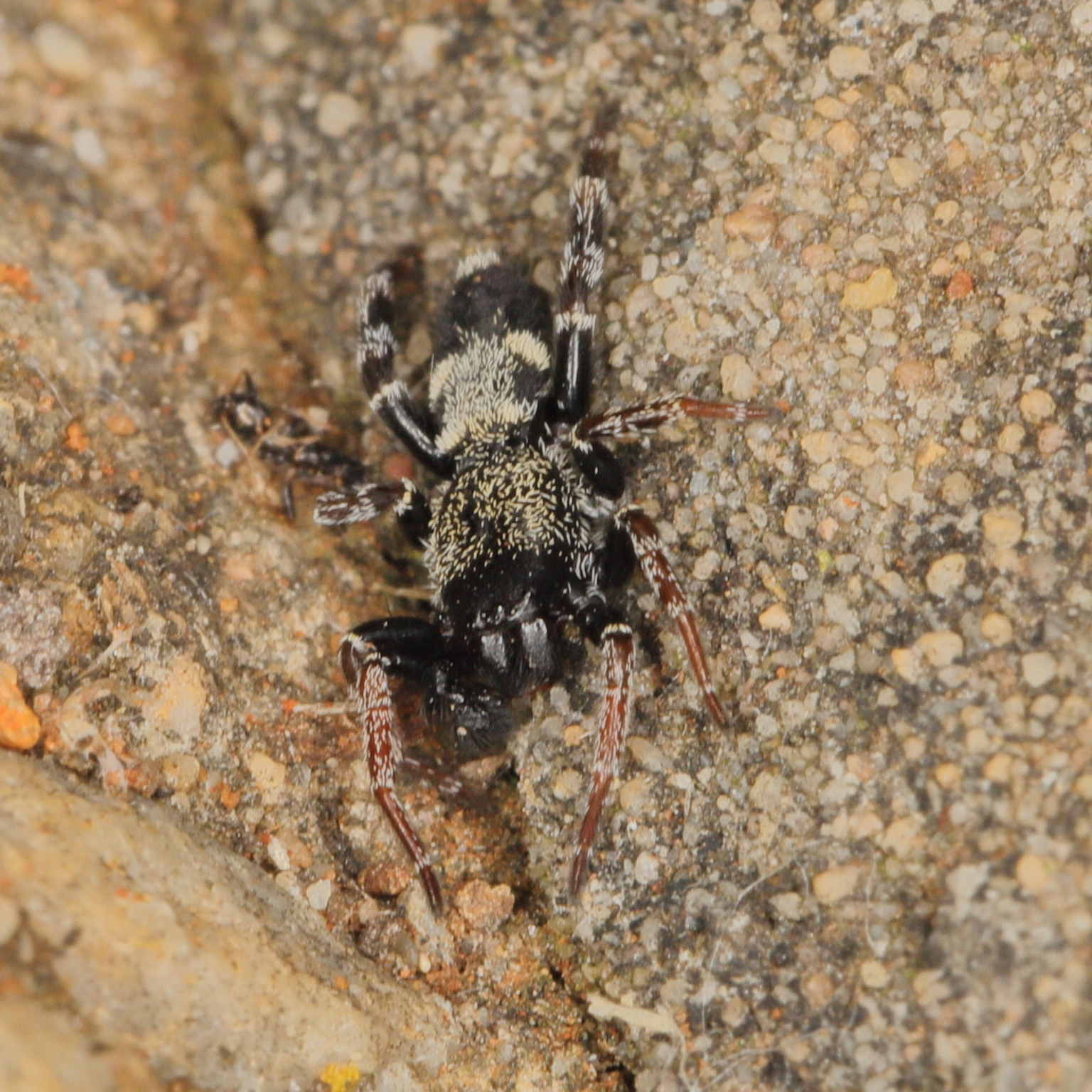

Scientific classification
- Kingdom: Animalia
- Phylum: Arthropoda
- Subphylum: Chelicerata
- Class: Arachnida
- Order: Araneae
- Infraorder: Araneomorphae
- Family: Penestomidae
- Genus: Penestomus
- Species: P. stilleri

Binomial name
- Penestomus stilleri (Dippenaar-Schoeman, 1989)

Synonyms
- Wajane stilleri Dippenaar-Schoeman, 1989

= Penestomus stilleri =

Stiller's Flat Velvet Spider

Species of spider

Penestomus stilleri is a species of spider in the family Penestomidae. It is endemic to the Western Cape province of South Africa.

== Distribution ==
Penestomus stilleri is known from several localities in the Western Cape, including Paarl, the Cederberg Wilderness Area, and Saldanha Bay.

== Habitat ==
The species inhabits the Fynbos biome. The type specimen was found in silk-lined tunnels under an exfoliated section of rock in a boulder.

== Description ==
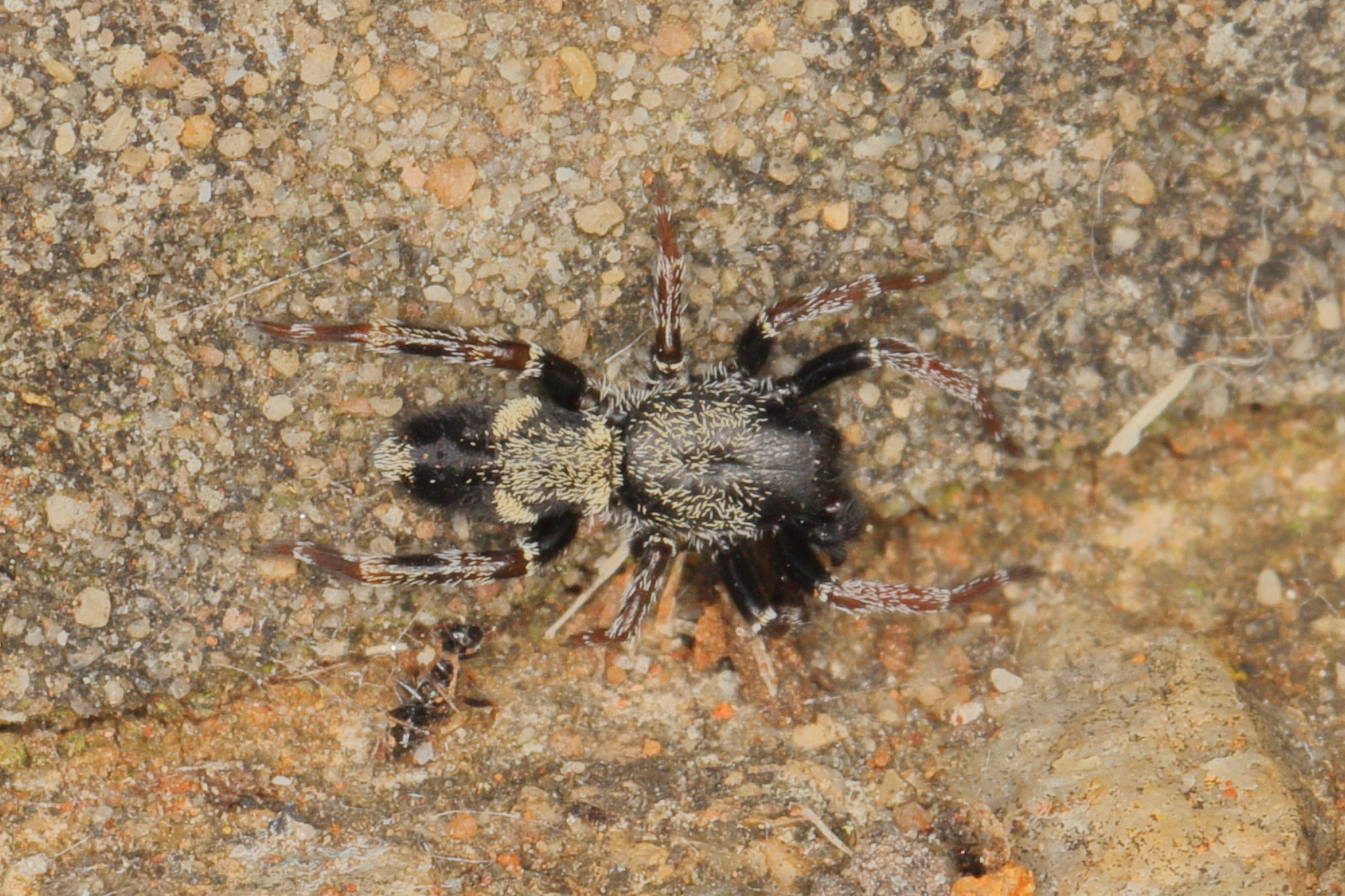

Only females of Penestomus stilleri are known to science.

The carapace is orange-yellow, lighter posteriorly with a smooth texture. The sternum is dusky pale yellow. The chelicerae are orange with five promarginal teeth and two retromarginal teeth.

The legs are brown basally, with legs I and II orange distally and posterior legs pale yellow distally. The opisthosoma is medium gray dorsally with light dorsolateral patches.

== Conservation ==
The species is listed as Data Deficient by the IUCN due to taxonomic reasons, as males remain unknown and the full species range requires further study. It is protected within the Cederberg Wilderness Area.
