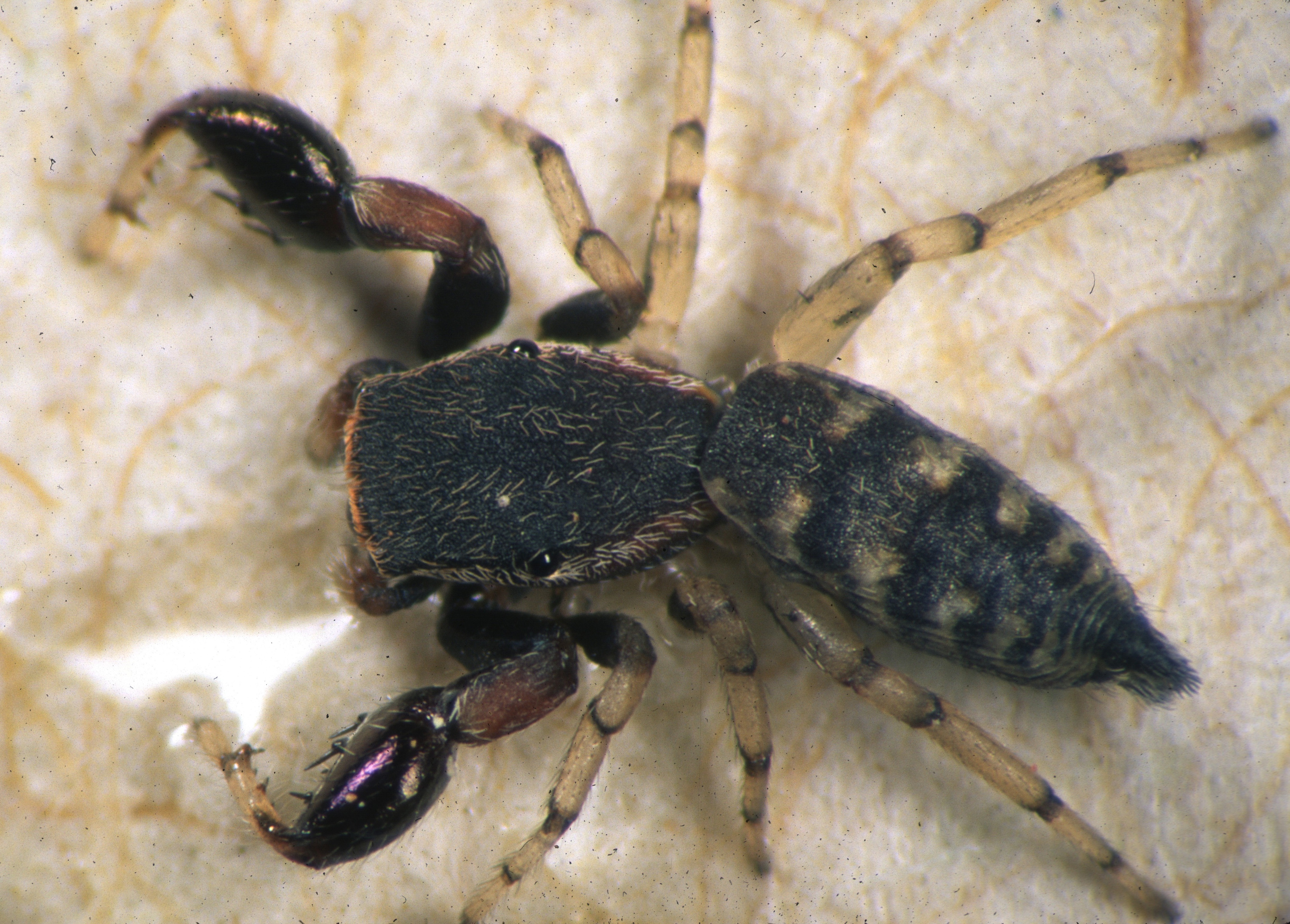

Scientific classification
- Kingdom: Animalia
- Phylum: Arthropoda
- Subphylum: Chelicerata
- Class: Arachnida
- Order: Araneae
- Infraorder: Araneomorphae
- Family: Salticidae
- Genus: Cheliferoides
- Species: C. segmentatus

Binomial name
- Cheliferoides segmentatus F. O. P.-Cambridge, 1901

= Cheliferoides segmentatus =

Species of spider

Cheliferoides segmentatus is a species of jumping spider in the family Salticidae. It is found in a range from the United States to Guatemala.
