= Penestomus zulu =

Scientific classification
- Kingdom: Animalia
- Phylum: Arthropoda
- Subphylum: Chelicerata
- Class: Arachnida
- Order: Araneae
- Infraorder: Araneomorphae
- Family: Penestomidae
- Genus: Penestomus
- Species: P. zulu

Binomial name
- Penestomus zulu Miller, Griswold & Haddad, 2010

Species of spider

Penestomus zulu is a species of spider in the family Penestomidae. It is endemic to KwaZulu-Natal province of South Africa.

== Distribution ==
Penestomus zulu is known only from Mfongosi in KwaZulu-Natal.

== Habitat ==
The species inhabits the Savanna biome, where it constructs retreat-webs that are usually made underneath rocks.

== Description ==
Only females of Penestomus zulu are known to science. The carapace is orange, lighter posteriorly with a smooth texture, covered by fine black setae and broad white setae. The sternum is pale. The chelicerae are red-brown with five promarginal teeth and two retromarginal teeth. The legs are dusky yellow with anterior legs orange distally. The opisthosoma is dark gray dorsally with indistinct light dorsolateral patches.

== Conservation ==
The species is listed as Data Deficient by the IUCN due to taxonomic reasons, as males remain unknown and the full species range requires further study.
