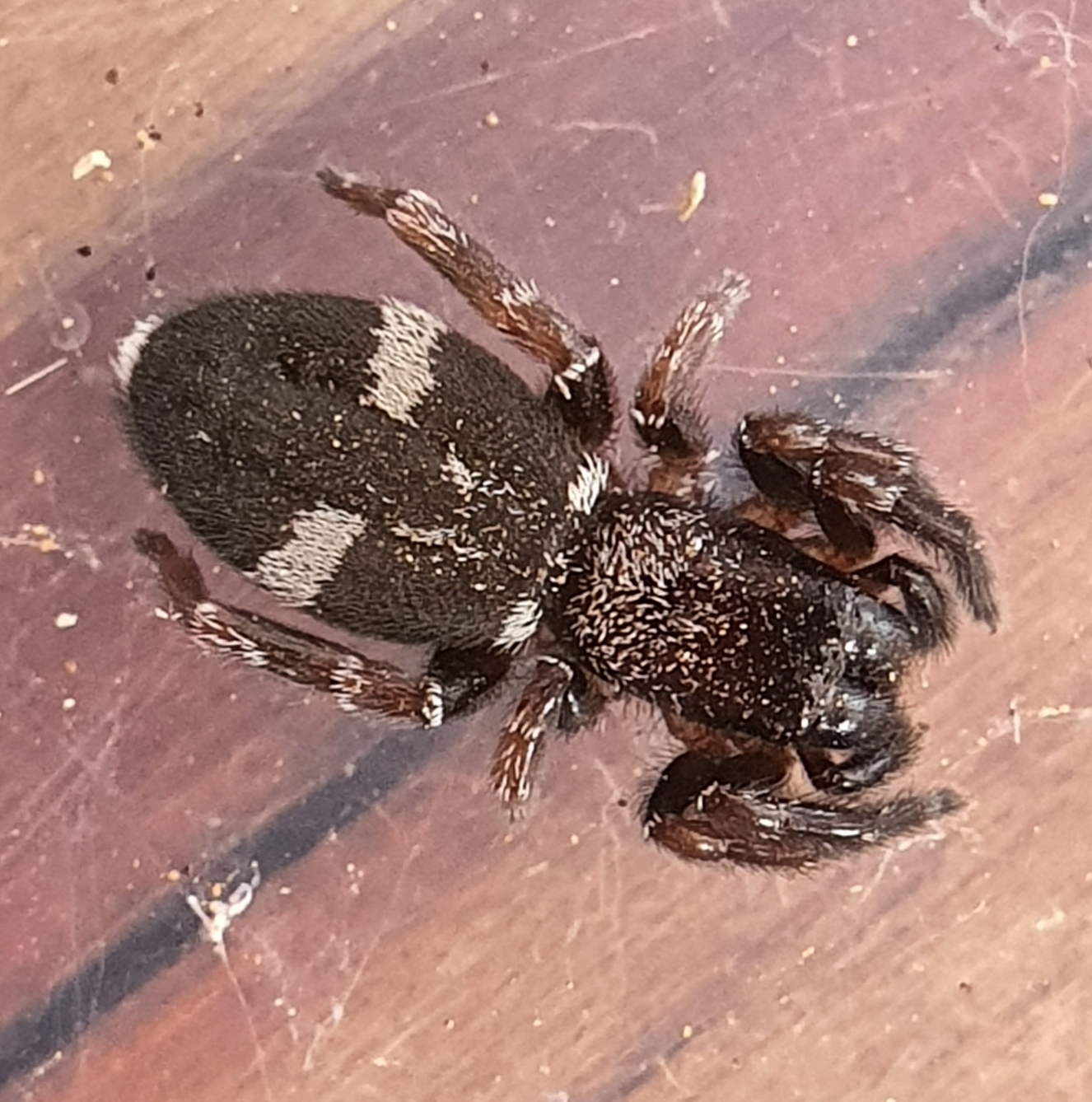
- Female
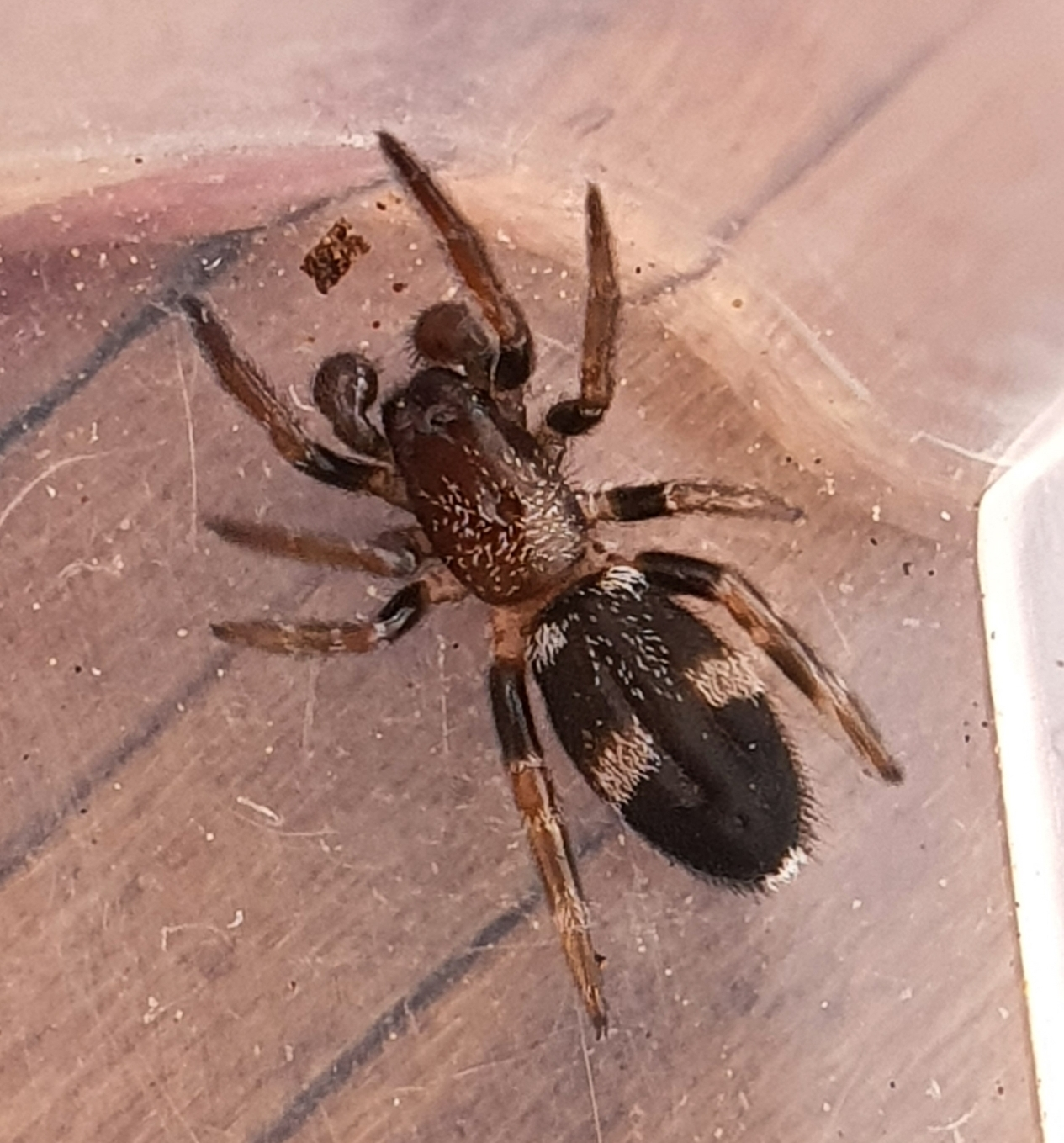
- Male

Conservation status
- Least Concern (IUCN 3.1)

Scientific classification
- Kingdom: Animalia
- Phylum: Arthropoda
- Subphylum: Chelicerata
- Class: Arachnida
- Order: Araneae
- Infraorder: Araneomorphae
- Family: Penestomidae
- Genus: Penestomus
- Species: P. egazini

Binomial name
- Penestomus egazini Miller, Griswold & Haddad, 2010

= Penestomus egazini =

Species of spider

Penestomus egazini, commonly known as the Grahamstown flat velvet spider is a species of spider in the family Penestomidae. It is endemic to the Eastern Cape province of South Africa.

== Distribution ==
Penestomus egazini is known from several localities in the Eastern Cape, including Grahamstown, Alicedale, and an area southeast of Cradock.

== Habitat ==
The species inhabits the Thicket biome and has been found under Eucalyptus bark. Some specimens have also been collected inside garden woodsheds. Prey remains suggest a diet dominated by Formicidae (especially Camponotus and Lepisiota) with some Coleoptera and Hemiptera.

== Description ==
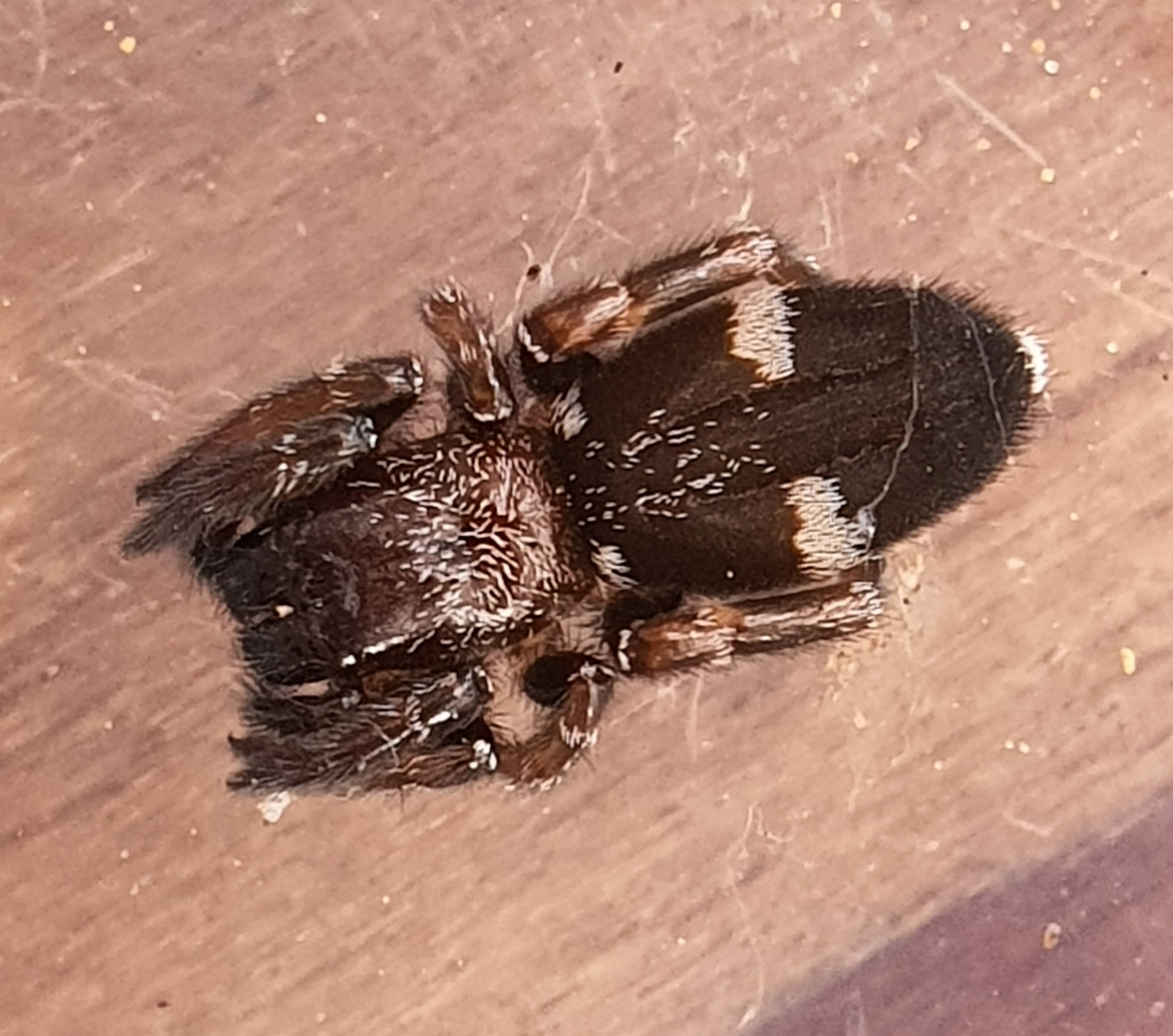
female

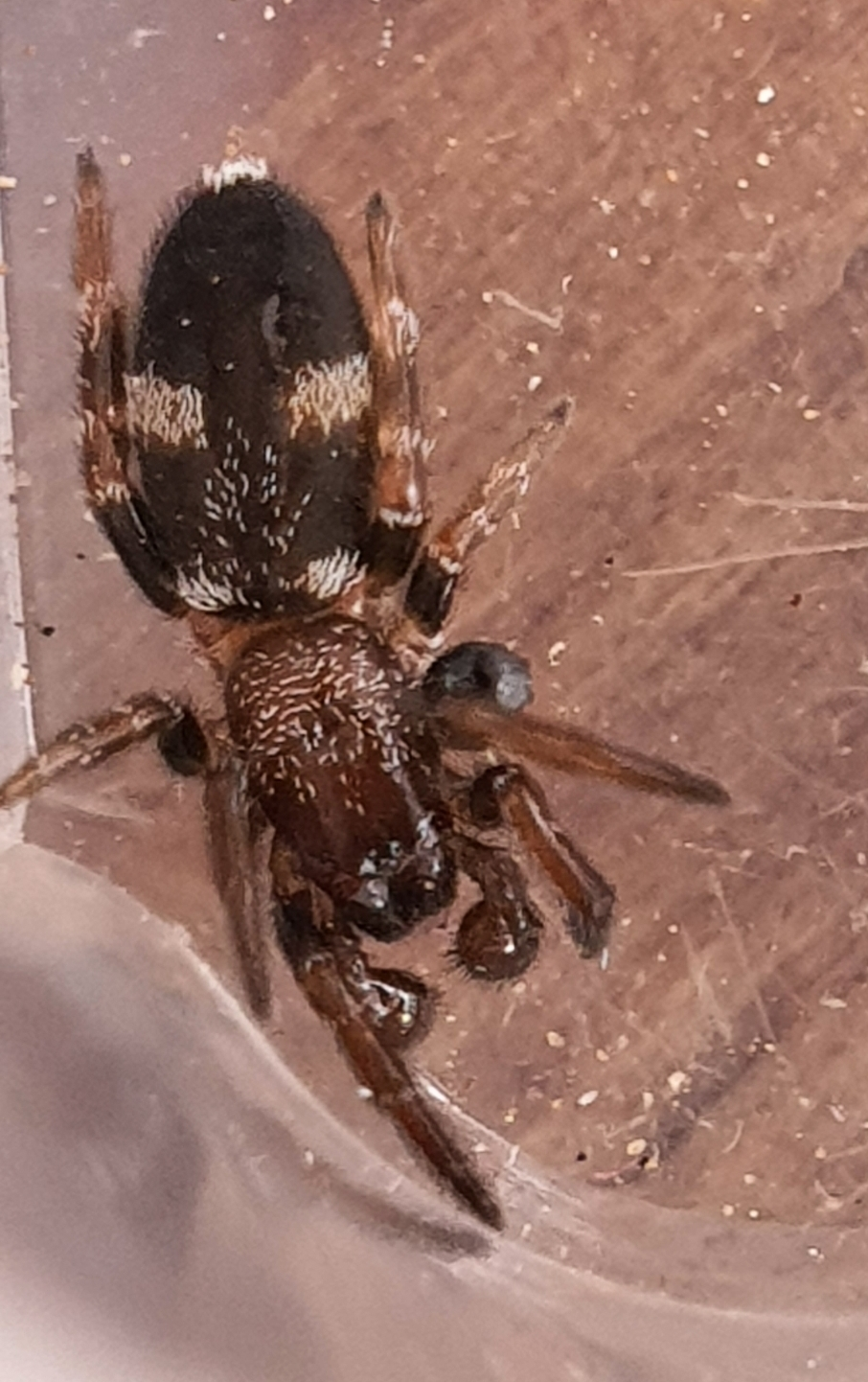
male

Both sexes of Penestomus egazini are known to science. The carapace is brown and rugose, covered by fine black setae with broad white setae concentrated in the thoracic region. The sternum is dusky pale yellow.

The chelicerae are brown with six promarginal teeth and three retromarginal teeth, bearing fine black setae only. The legs are brown basally and pale yellow distally. The opisthosoma is dark gray dorsally with a pair of narrow light dorsolateral patches, covered with a mixture of fine black and broad white setae.

== Conservation ==
Due to its small restricted distribution range of less than 500 square kilometers, the species is regarded as Rare.
