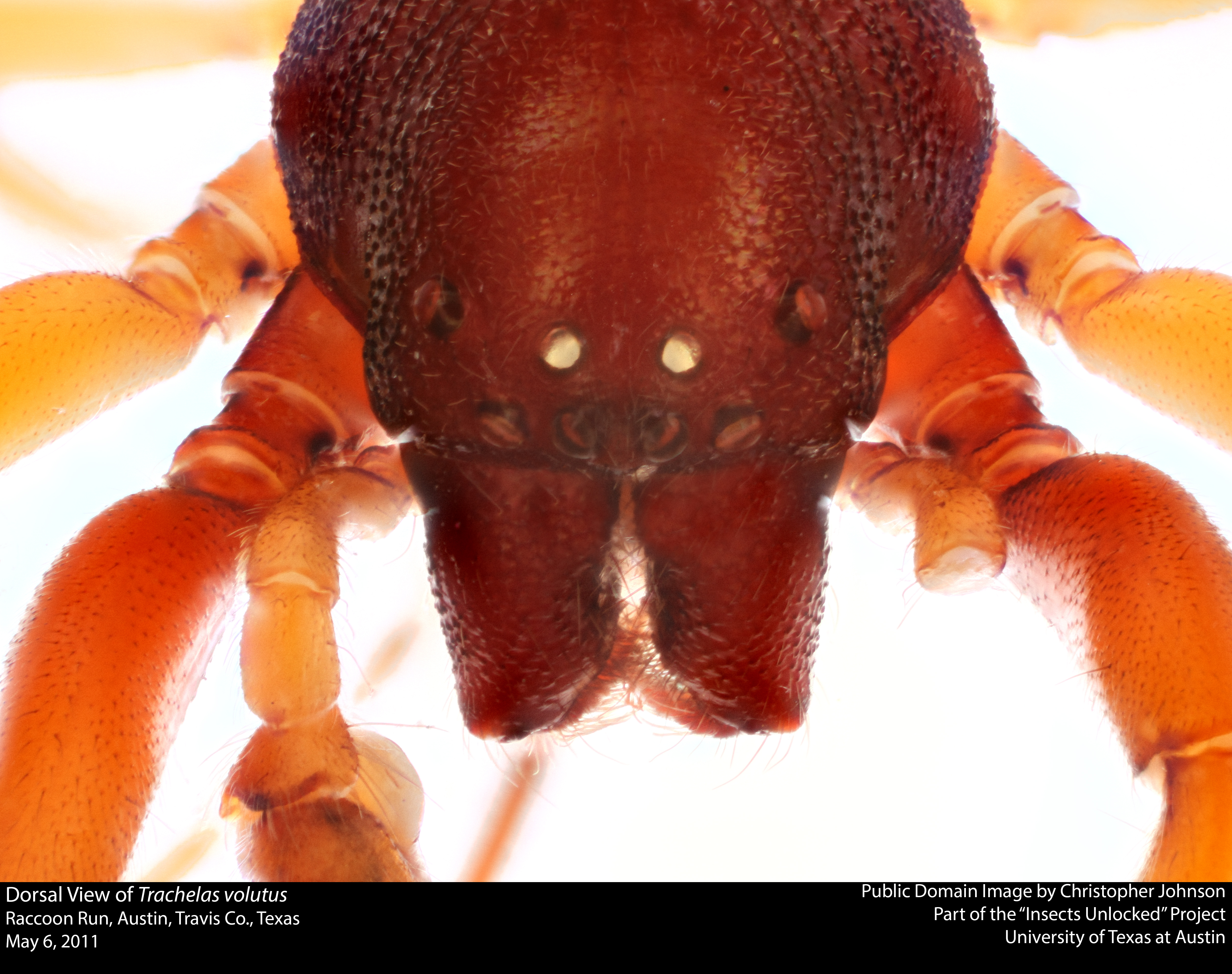

Scientific classification
- Domain: Eukaryota
- Kingdom: Animalia
- Phylum: Arthropoda
- Subphylum: Chelicerata
- Class: Arachnida
- Order: Araneae
- Infraorder: Araneomorphae
- Family: Trachelidae
- Genus: Trachelas
- Species: T. volutus

Binomial name
- Trachelas volutus Gertsch, 1935

= Trachelas volutus =

Species of spider

Trachelas volutus is a species of true spider in the family Trachelidae. It is found in the United States and Mexico.
