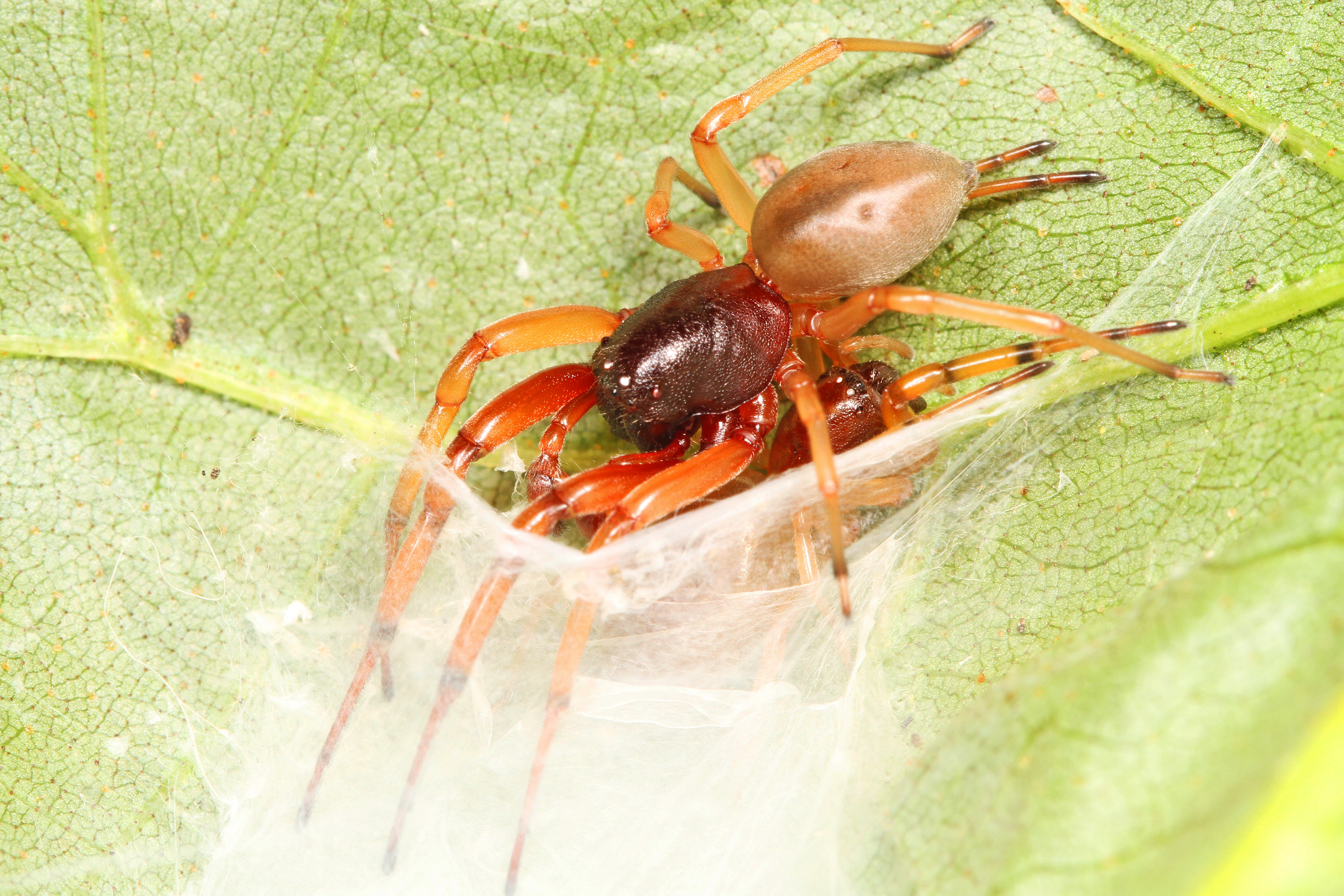

Scientific classification
- Domain: Eukaryota
- Kingdom: Animalia
- Phylum: Arthropoda
- Subphylum: Chelicerata
- Class: Arachnida
- Order: Araneae
- Infraorder: Araneomorphae
- Family: Trachelidae
- Genus: Trachelas
- Species: T. tranquillus

Binomial name
- Trachelas tranquillus (Hentz, 1847)

= Trachelas tranquillus =

Species of spider

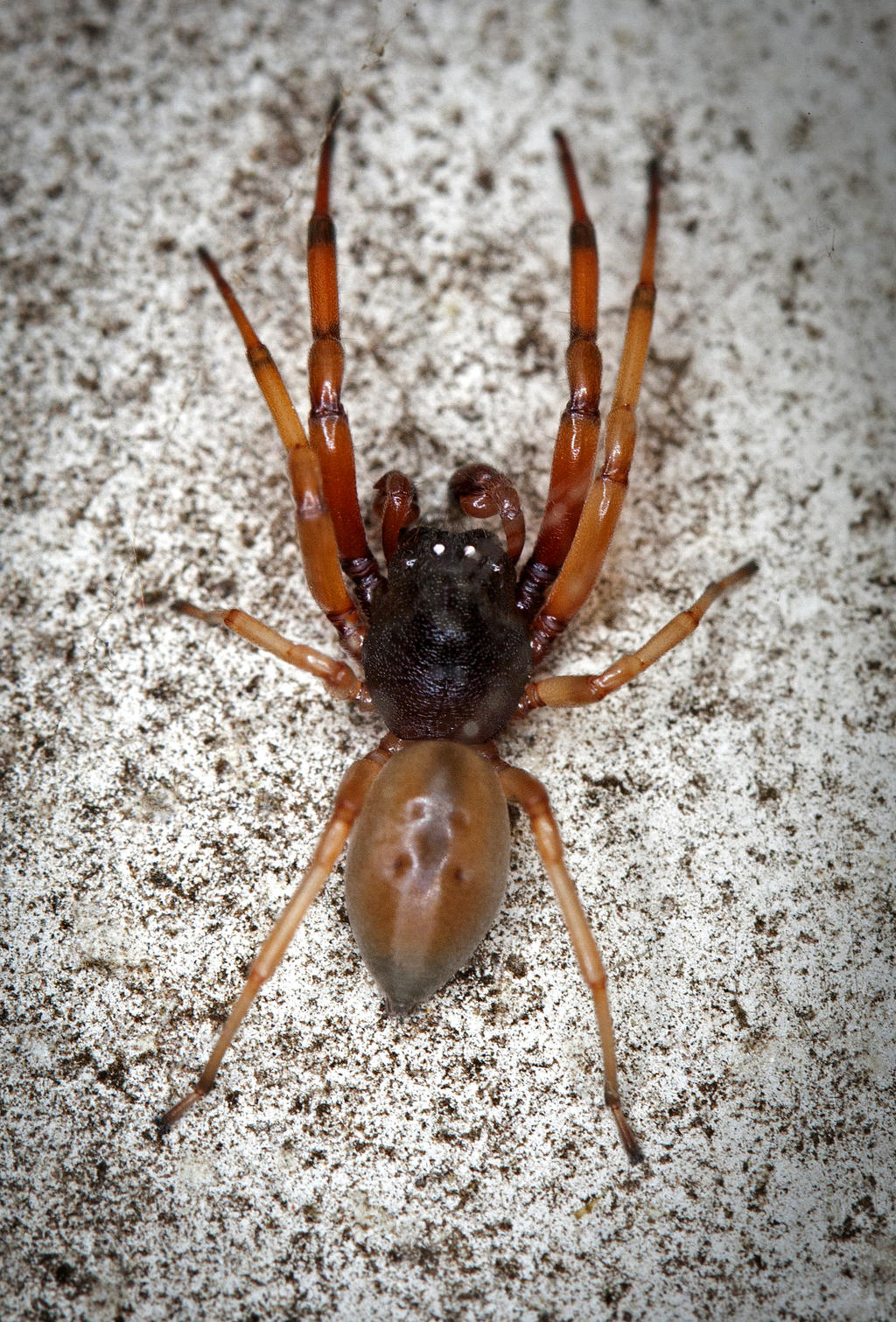
Broad faced sac spider (Trachelas tranquillus) dorsal view

Trachelas tranquillus, the broad-faced sac spider, is a species of true spider in the family Trachelidae. It is found in the United States and Canada.

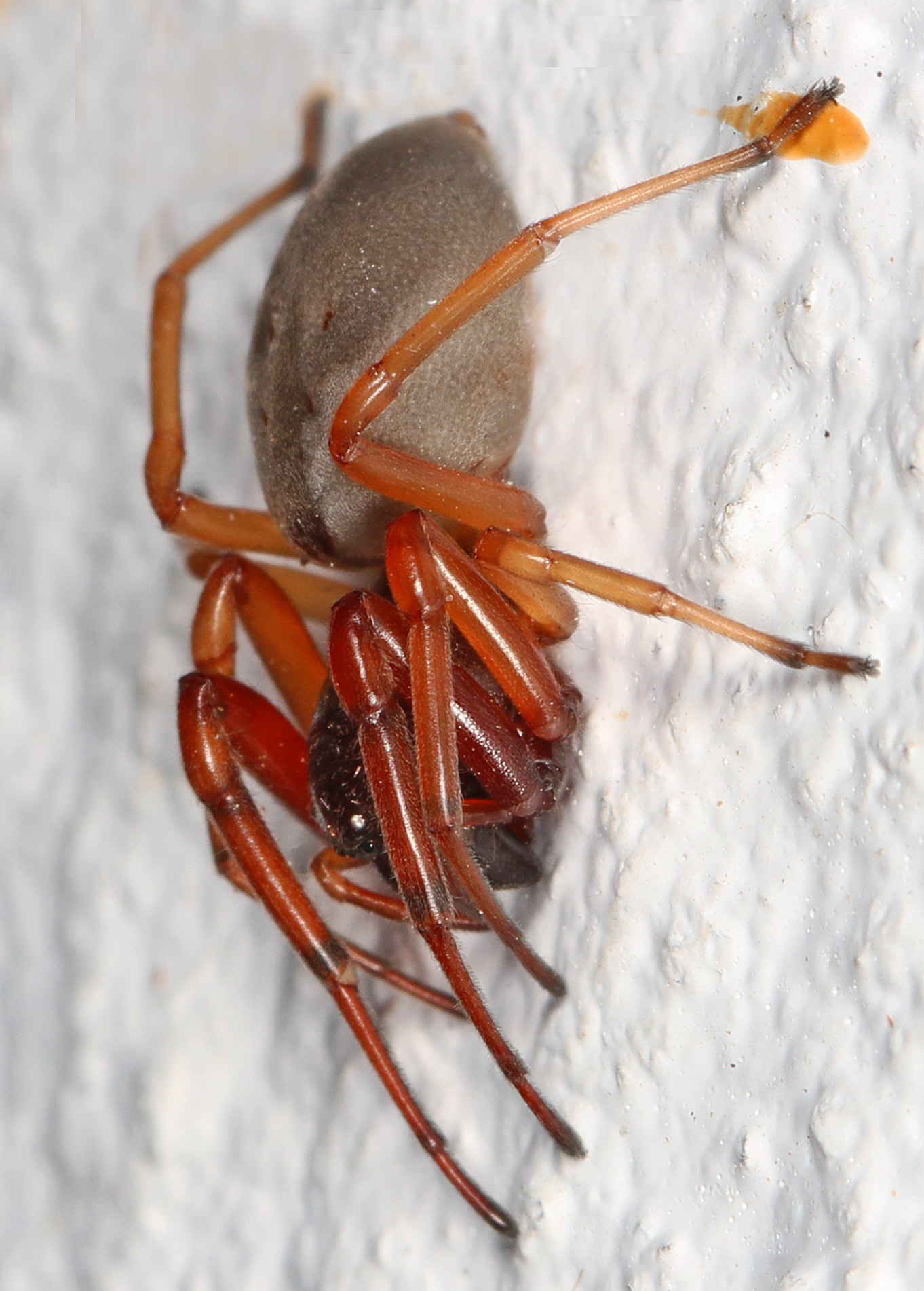
Broad-faced sac spider, Trachelas tranquillus
