= Penestomus armatus =

Scientific classification
- Kingdom: Animalia
- Phylum: Arthropoda
- Subphylum: Chelicerata
- Class: Arachnida
- Order: Araneae
- Infraorder: Araneomorphae
- Family: Penestomidae
- Genus: Penestomus
- Species: P. armatus

Binomial name
- Penestomus armatus (Lehtinen, 1967)

Synonyms
- Wajane armata Lehtinen, 1967

Species of spider

Penestomus armatus is a species of spider in the family Penestomidae. It is endemic to the Eastern Cape province of South Africa.

== Distribution ==
Penestomus armatus is known only from Alicedale in the Eastern Cape.

== Habitat ==
The species inhabits the Thicket biome and constructs retreat-webs.

== Description ==
Only males of Penestomus armatus are known to science. The carapace is orange and rugose, while the sternum is pale yellow. The chelicerae are orange with five promarginal teeth and two retromarginal teeth. The legs are brown basally and pale yellow distally. The opisthosoma is light gray dorsally with a pair of light dorsolateral patches.

== Conservation ==
The species is listed as Data Deficient by the IUCN due to taxonomic reasons, as females remain unknown and the full species range requires further study.
