= Penestomus croeseri =

Scientific classification
- Kingdom: Animalia
- Phylum: Arthropoda
- Subphylum: Chelicerata
- Class: Arachnida
- Order: Araneae
- Infraorder: Araneomorphae
- Family: Penestomidae
- Genus: Penestomus
- Species: P. croeseri

Binomial name
- Penestomus croeseri Dippenaar-Schoeman, 1989

Species of spider

Penestomus croeseri is a species of spider in the family Penestomidae. It is endemic to the Eastern Cape province of South Africa.

== Distribution ==
Penestomus croeseri is known only from Grahamstown in the Eastern Cape.

== Habitat ==
The holotype was collected from riverine bush in the Thicket biome, where it was found at 552 m above sea level on the soil surface in a retreat-web.

== Description ==
Only females of Penestomus croeseri are known to science. The carapace is red-brown, lighter posteriorly with a smooth texture, covered with sparse fine black setae and broad white setae mostly at the margin and fovea region. The sternum is dusky pale yellow. The chelicerae are red-brown with six promarginal teeth and three retromarginal teeth, bearing fine black setae only.

The legs are brown basally, with anterior legs red-brown distally and posterior legs pale yellow distally. The opisthosoma is medium gray dorsally without light dorsolateral patches, covered by fine black setae and broad white setae around the margin.

== Conservation ==
The species is listed as Data Deficient by the IUCN due to taxonomic reasons, as males remain unknown and the full species range requires further study.
