= Penestomus prendinii =

Scientific classification
- Kingdom: Animalia
- Phylum: Arthropoda
- Subphylum: Chelicerata
- Class: Arachnida
- Order: Araneae
- Infraorder: Araneomorphae
- Family: Penestomidae
- Genus: Penestomus
- Species: P. prendinii

Binomial name
- Penestomus prendinii Miller, Griswold & Haddad, 2010

Species of spider

Penestomus prendinii is a species of spider in the family Penestomidae. It is endemic to South Africa.

== Distribution ==
Penestomus prendinii has been recorded from the Eastern Cape and Western Cape provinces of South Africa, including Farm Spitskop near Beaufort West and Fort Fordyce Forest Reserve.

== Habitat ==
The species inhabits the Nama Karoo and Forest biomes, where it constructs retreat-webs that are usually made underneath rocks.

== Description ==
Only females of Penestomus prendinii are known to science. The carapace is brown with somewhat rounded lateral margins, covered by fine black setae with broad white setae concentrated posterior to the fovea. The sternum is dusky pale yellow. The chelicerae are brown with five promarginal teeth and two retromarginal teeth, bearing fine black setae only. The legs are dusky brown basally, with anterior legs orange distally and posterior legs yellow distally. The opisthosoma is dark gray dorsally with a pair of broad light dorsolateral patches, covered with a mixture of fine black and broad white setae.

== Conservation ==
The species is listed as Data Deficient by the IUCN due to taxonomic reasons, as males remain unknown and the full species range requires further study.
