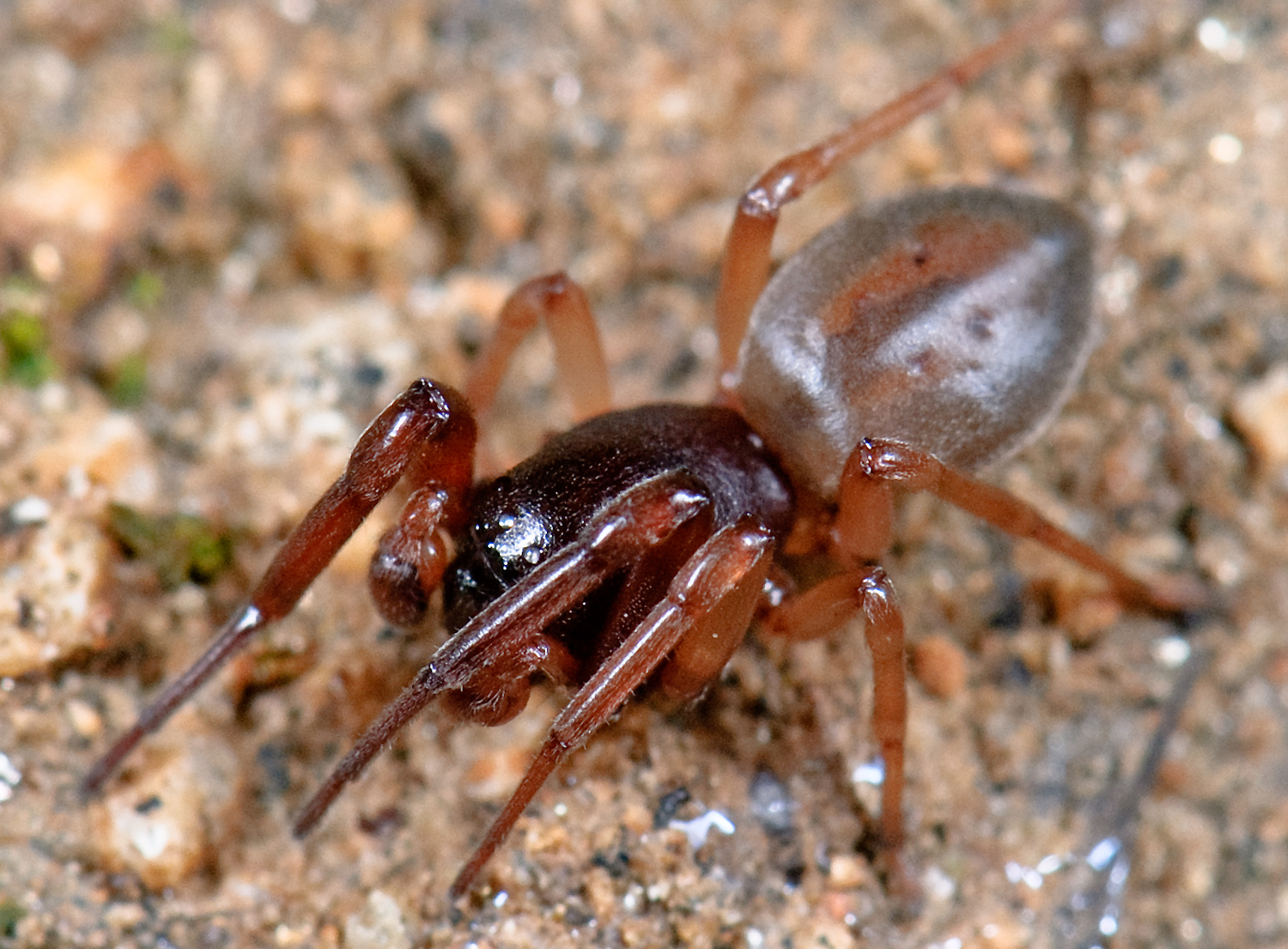

Scientific classification
- Kingdom: Animalia
- Phylum: Arthropoda
- Subphylum: Chelicerata
- Class: Arachnida
- Order: Araneae
- Infraorder: Araneomorphae
- Family: Trachelidae
- Genus: Trachelas
- Species: T. pacificus

Binomial name
- Trachelas pacificus Chamberlin & Ivie, 1935

= Trachelas pacificus =

Species of spider

Trachelas pacificus is a species of true spider in the family Trachelidae. It is found in the United States and Mexico, specifically Arizona, California, Nevada and Baja California. They are commonly found in houses, and adults can be found year-round.
