= Penestomus kruger =

Scientific classification
- Kingdom: Animalia
- Phylum: Arthropoda
- Subphylum: Chelicerata
- Class: Arachnida
- Order: Araneae
- Infraorder: Araneomorphae
- Family: Penestomidae
- Genus: Penestomus
- Species: P. kruger

Binomial name
- Penestomus kruger Miller, Griswold & Haddad, 2010

Species of spider

Penestomus kruger is a species of spider in the family Penestomidae. It is endemic to the Western Cape province of South Africa.

== Distribution ==
Penestomus kruger is known only from the Karoo National Park in the Western Cape.

== Habitat ==
The species inhabits the Nama Karoo biome, where it constructs retreat-webs underneath rocks.

== Description ==
Only females of Penestomus kruger are known to science. The carapace is red-brown, lighter posteriorly with a smooth texture, covered by fine black setae with broad white setae mostly posterior to the fovea. The sternum is pale yellow.

The chelicerae are red-brown with six promarginal teeth and two retromarginal teeth, bearing fine black setae only. The legs are dusky orange basally, with anterior legs red-orange distally and posterior legs orange distally. The opisthosoma is dark gray dorsally with light dorsolateral patches and smaller light patches anteriorly and above the spinnerets.

== Conservation ==
The species is listed as Data Deficient by the IUCN due to taxonomic reasons, as males remain unknown and the full species range requires further study.

== Taxonomy ==
The type locality was originally incorrectly listed as Kruger National Park instead of Karoo National Park.
