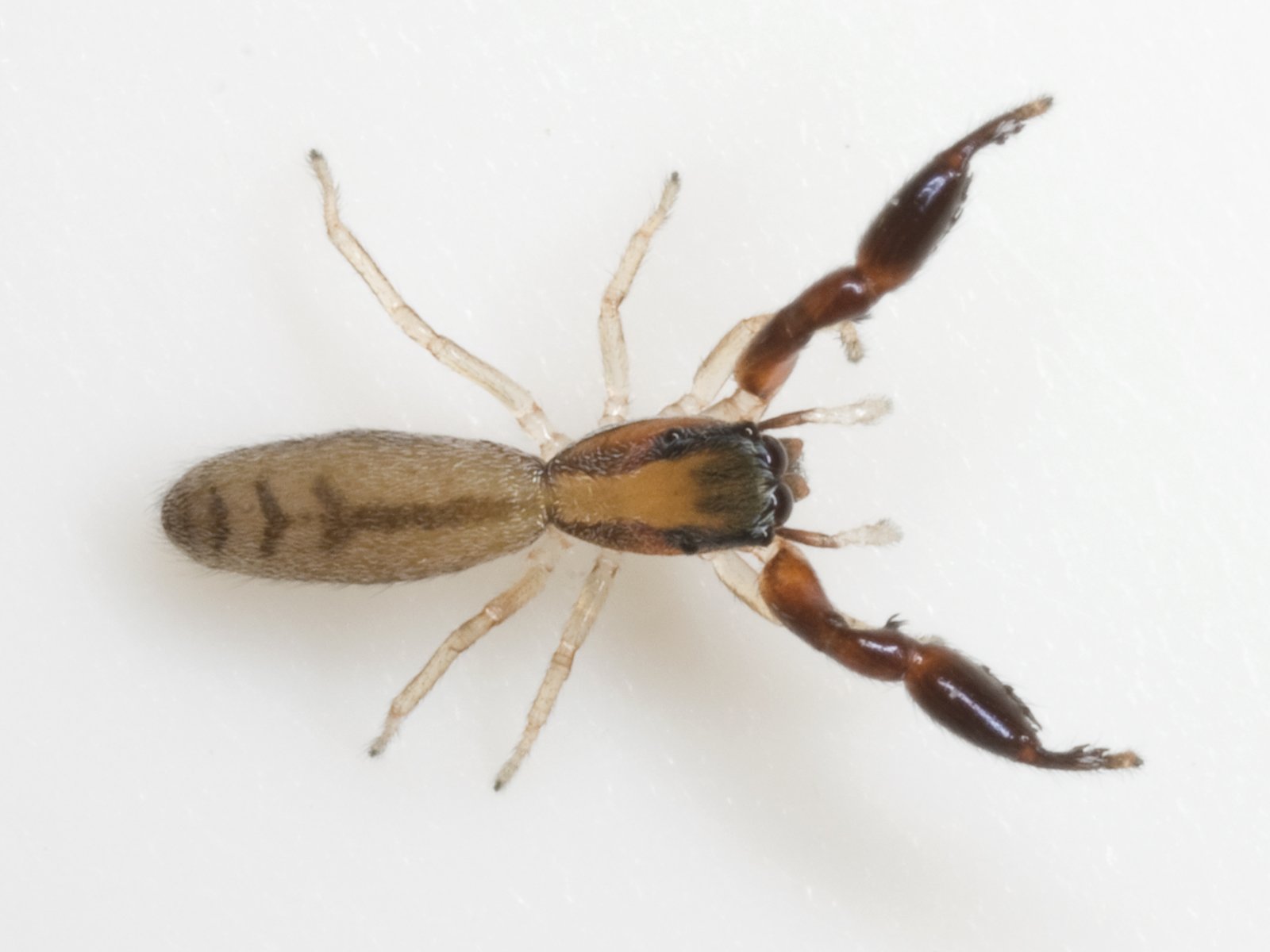

Scientific classification
- Kingdom: Animalia
- Phylum: Arthropoda
- Subphylum: Chelicerata
- Class: Arachnida
- Order: Araneae
- Infraorder: Araneomorphae
- Family: Salticidae
- Genus: Cheliferoides
- Species: C. longimanus

Binomial name
- Cheliferoides longimanus Gertsch, 1936

= Cheliferoides longimanus =

Species of spider

Cheliferoides longimanus is a species of jumping spider in the family Salticidae. It is found in the United States.

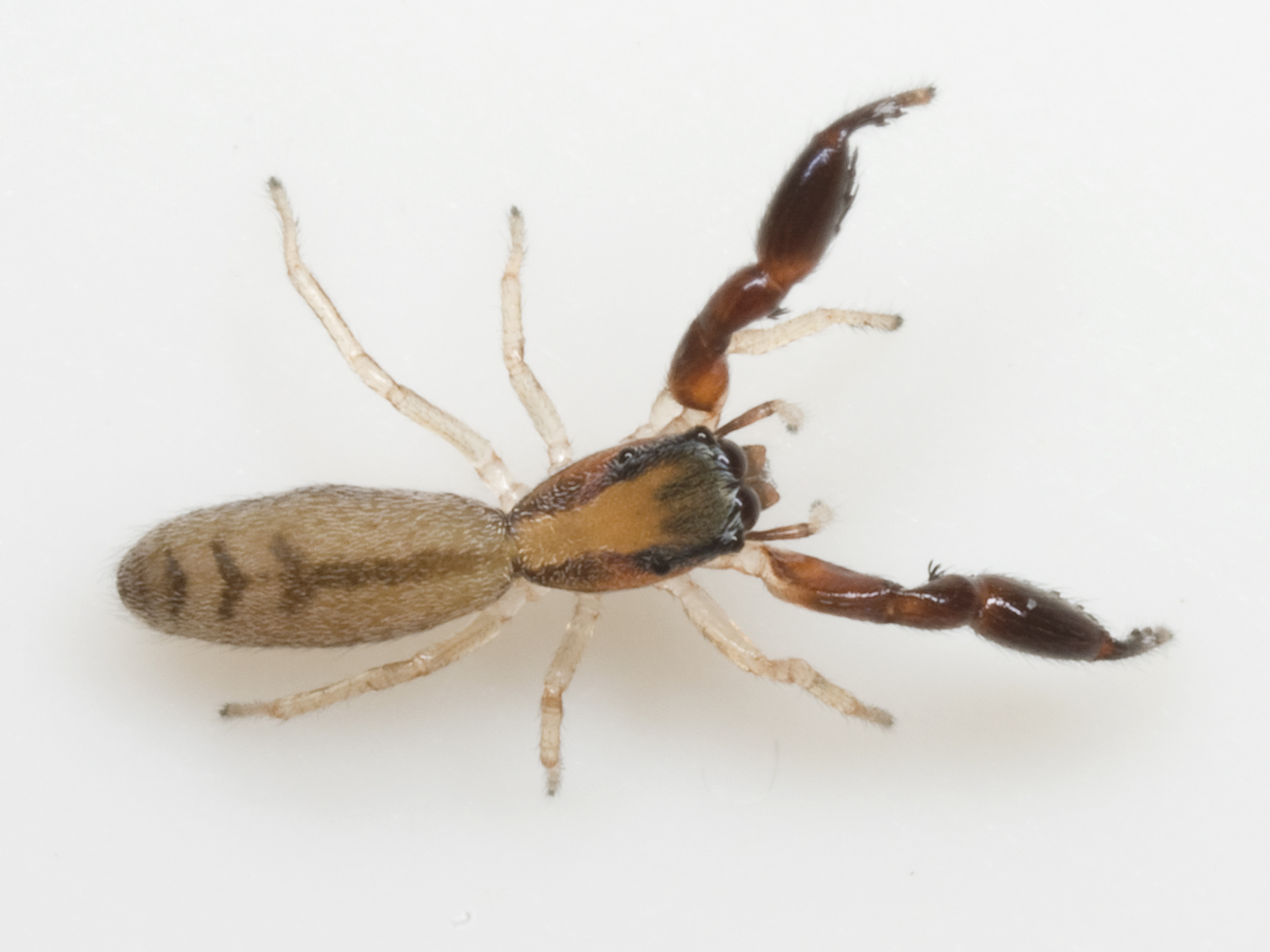
