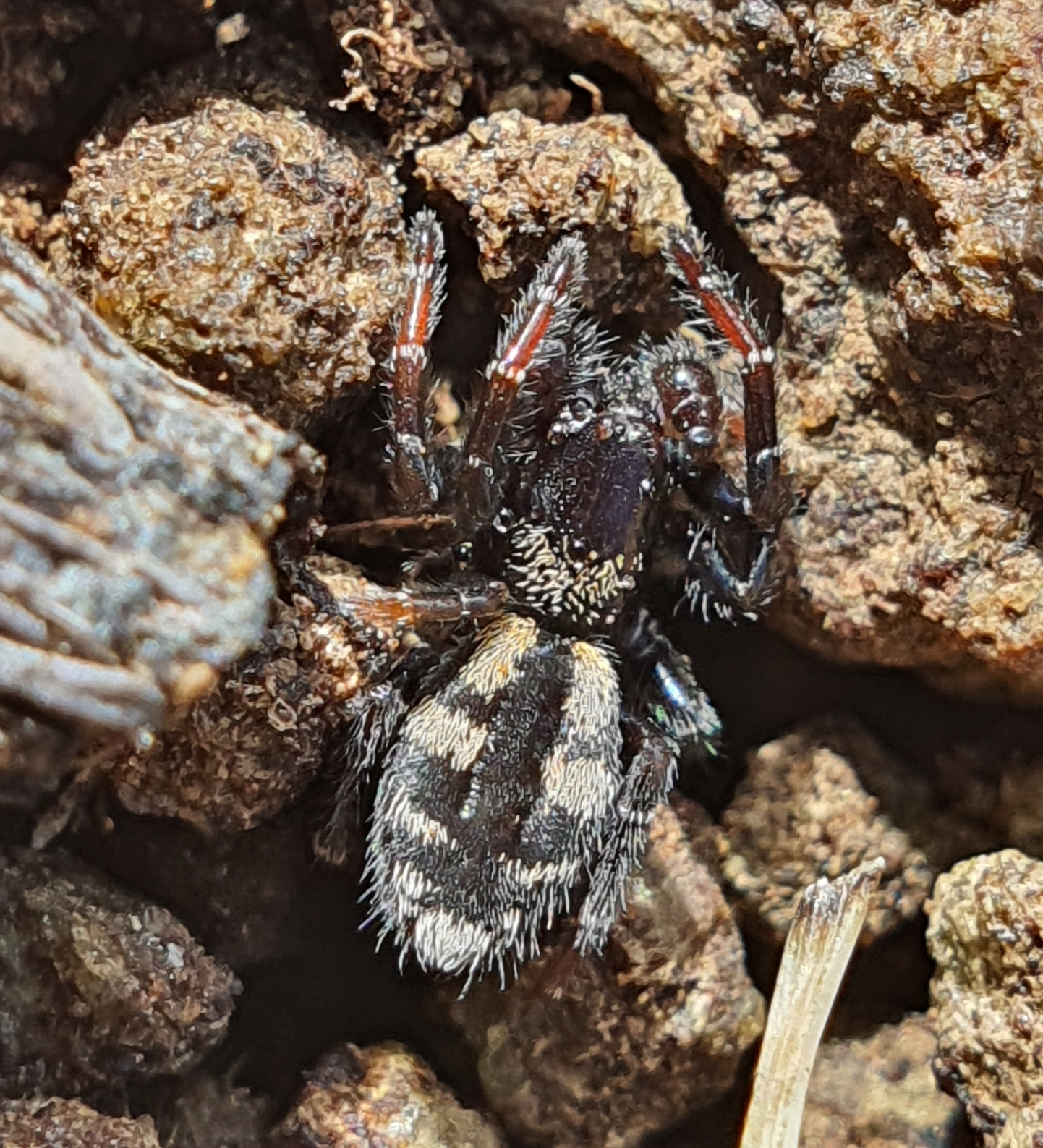
- Male Penestomus montanus

Scientific classification
- Kingdom: Animalia
- Phylum: Arthropoda
- Subphylum: Chelicerata
- Class: Arachnida
- Order: Araneae
- Infraorder: Araneomorphae
- Family: Penestomidae
- Genus: Penestomus
- Species: P. montanus

Binomial name
- Penestomus montanus Miller, Griswold & Haddad, 2010

= Penestomus montanus =

Species of spider

Penestomus montanus is a species of spider in the family Penestomidae. It occurs in South Africa and Lesotho.

== Distribution ==
Penestomus montanus occurs in the Eastern Cape of South Africa and in Lesotho. In South Africa, it has been recorded from Qacha's Nek and Prentjiesberg in the Eastern Cape, and from Sani Pass in KwaZulu-Natal. The species occurs at elevations of 1400-1900 m above sea level.

== Habitat ==
The species inhabits the Grassland biome, where it constructs retreat-webs underneath rocks lying on the soil surface. The webs follow a winding path that varies from approximately 6 cm in early instar immatures to approximately 18 cm in adult females. Prey remains include Formicidae, Curculionidae, and small Gryllidae.

== Description ==
Both sexes of Penestomus montanus are known to science. The carapace is brown and rugose, covered by fine black setae with broad white setae concentrated in the thoracic region. The fovea is round and shallow. The sternum is dusky pale yellow.

The chelicerae are dark red-brown with four promarginal teeth and two retromarginal teeth. In males, the chelicerae bear both fine black setae and broad white setae, while females have fine black setae only. The legs bear broad white setae (more pronounced in males than females) and fine black setae.

The legs are brown basally and pale yellow distally. The opisthosoma is dark gray dorsally with a pair of light dorsolateral patches, covered with a mixture of fine black and broad white setae.

== Conservation ==
Due to its small restricted distribution range, the species is listed as Rare.
