= Trachelas quisquiliarum =

Scientific classification
- Kingdom: Animalia
- Phylum: Arthropoda
- Subphylum: Chelicerata
- Class: Arachnida
- Order: Araneae
- Infraorder: Araneomorphae
- Family: Trachelidae
- Genus: Trachelas
- Species: T. quisquiliarum

Binomial name
- Trachelas quisquiliarum Simon, 1906

Species of spider

Trachelas quisquiliarum, is a species of spider of the genus Trachelas. It is endemic to Sri Lanka.
