= Carabus perrini perrini =

Scientific classification
- Kingdom: Animalia
- Phylum: Arthropoda
- Class: Insecta
- Order: Coleoptera
- Suborder: Adephaga
- Family: Carabidae
- Genus: Carabus
- Species: C. perrini
- Subspecies: C. p. perrini

Trinomial name
- Carabus perrini perrini Dejean, 1831

Synonyms
- Carabus orbicollis Motschulsky, 1846; Carabus campicola Reitter, 1896

Subspecies of beetle

Carabus perrini perrini is a subspecies of black-coloured beetle from the subfamily Carabinae that is endemic to Ukraine.
