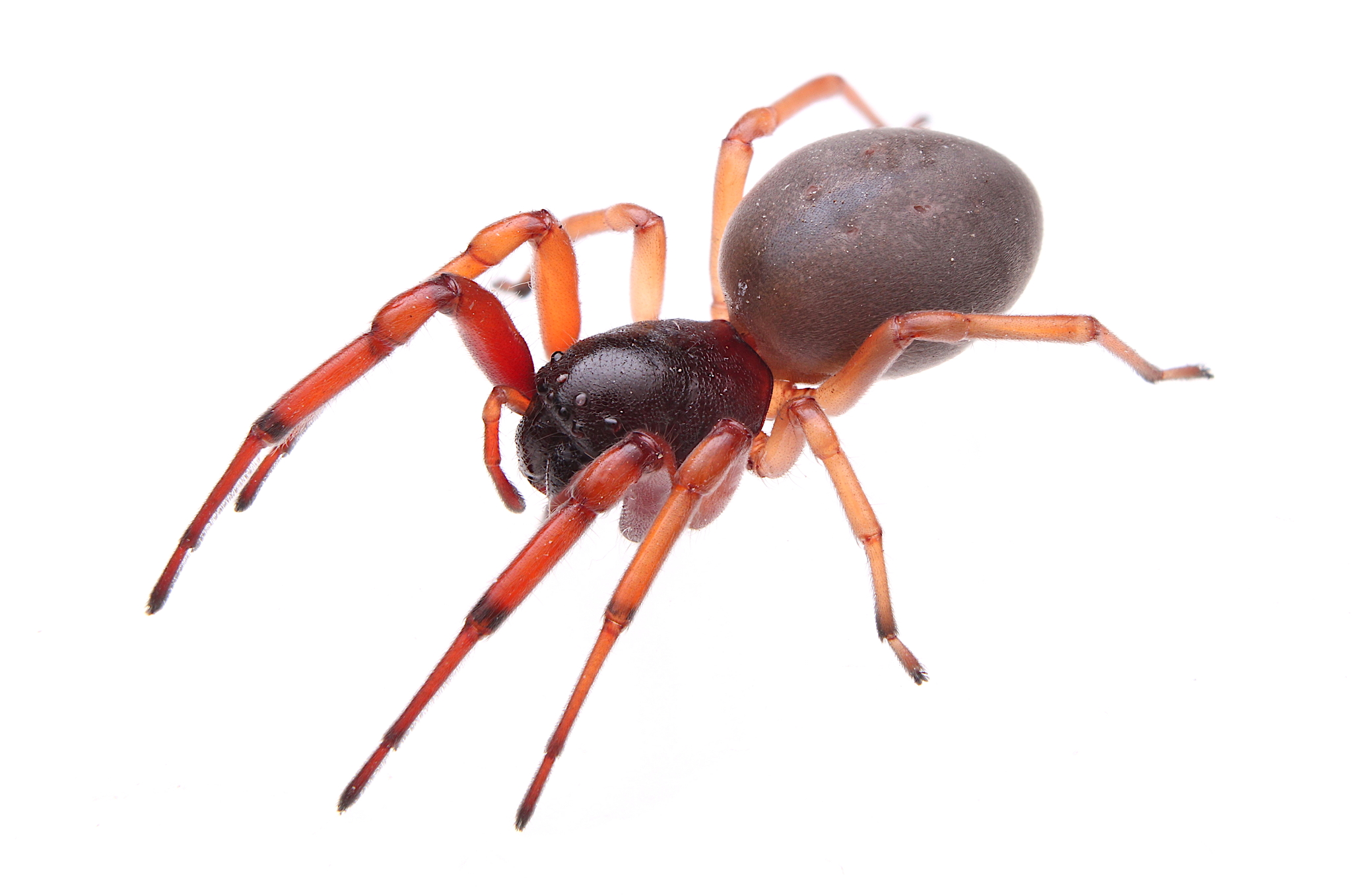
- T. tranquillus
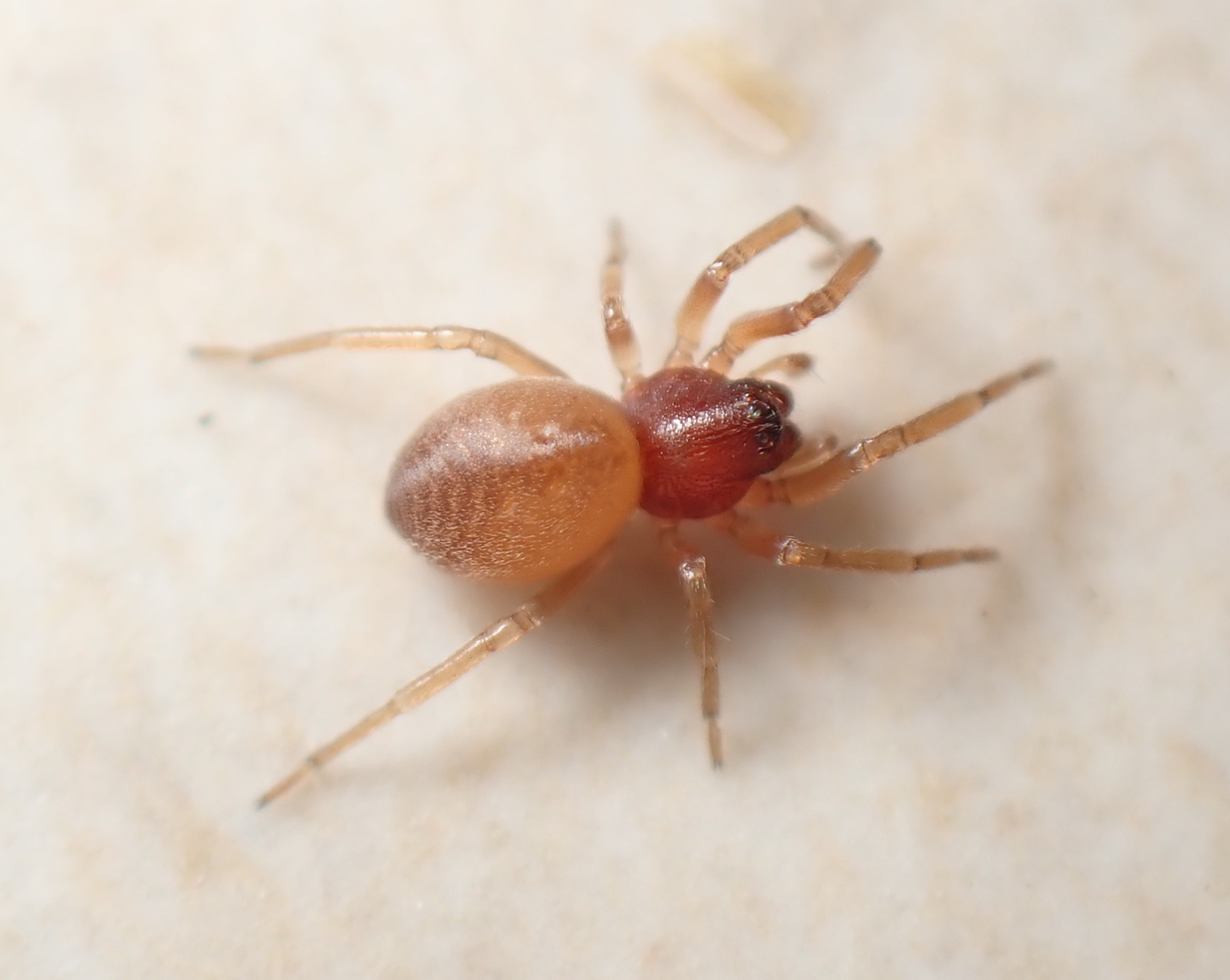
- T. minor

Scientific classification
- Kingdom: Animalia
- Phylum: Arthropoda
- Subphylum: Chelicerata
- Class: Arachnida
- Order: Araneae
- Infraorder: Araneomorphae
- Family: Trachelidae
- Genus: Trachelas; L. Koch, 1872

Type species
- T. minor O. Pickard-Cambridge, 1872

Species
- 99, see text

= Trachelas =

Genus of spiders

Trachelas is a genus of araneomorph spiders which has variously been placed in families Trachelidae or Corinnidae. Current taxonomy places it in Trachelidae.

Though the name was first used in an identification key published by Ludwig Carl Christian Koch in 1866, it did not include a description for either genders. In 1872, O. Pickard-Cambridge described the type species, ascribing it to the same name given several years earlier. Koch revisited the genus and covered it more thoroughly shortly after the type species was described.

== Species ==
As of October 2025, this genus includes 99 species.

These species have articles on Wikipedia:

- Trachelas oreophilus Simon, 1906 – India, Sri Lanka
- Trachelas pacificus Chamberlin & Ivie, 1935 – United States, Mexico
- Trachelas quisquiliarum Simon, 1906 – Sri Lanka
- Trachelas tranquillus (Hentz, 1847) – Canada, United States
- Trachelas volutus Gertsch, 1935 – United States, Mexico

Complete species list as of October 2025
- Trachelas alticola Hu, 2001 – China
- Trachelas anomalus (Taczanowski, 1874) – French Guiana
- Trachelas barroanus Chamberlin, 1925 – Panama
- Trachelas bicolor Keyserling, 1887 – Hispaniola (Haiti, Dominican Rep.)
- Trachelas bispinosus F. O. Pickard-Cambridge, 1899 – Mexico to Panama, Trinidad
- Trachelas bomiensis Jin & Mi, 2024 – China
- Trachelas borinquensis Gertsch, 1942 – Puerto Rico
- Trachelas brachialis Jin, Yin & Zhang, 2017 – China
- Trachelas bravidus Chickering, 1973 – Jamaica
- Trachelas bulbosus F. O. Pickard-Cambridge, 1899 – Mexico to El Salvador
- Trachelas cadulus Chickering, 1973 – Jamaica
- Trachelas cambridgei Kraus, 1955 – El Salvador to Panama
- Trachelas canariensis Wunderlich, 1987 – Spain, Canary Islands, Morocco, Algeria, Tunisia, Ethiopia, DR Congo, Uganda, Kenya, Rwanda, Angola, Botswana, South Africa, Lesotho
- Trachelas chamoli Quasin, Siliwal & Uniyal, 2018 – India
- Trachelas chubbi Lessert, 1921 – Cameroon, DR Congo, Kenya, Burundi, Tanzania
- Trachelas contractus Platnick & Shadab, 1974 – Cuba
- Trachelas costatus O. Pickard-Cambridge, 1885 – Pakistan, India
- Trachelas crassus Rivera-Quiroz & Álvarez-Padilla, 2015 – Mexico
- Trachelas crewsae Marusik & Fomichev, 2020 – Tajikistan
- Trachelas daubei Schmidt, 1971 – Ecuador
- Trachelas depressus Platnick & Shadab, 1974 – Mexico
- Trachelas devi Biswas & Raychaudhuri, 2000 – Bangladesh
- Trachelas digitus Platnick & Shadab, 1974 – Costa Rica
- Trachelas dilatus Platnick & Shadab, 1974 – Dominican Rep.
- Trachelas ductonuda Rivera-Quiroz & Álvarez-Padilla, 2015 – Mexico
- Trachelas ecudobus Chickering, 1973 – Panama, Trinidad
- Trachelas erectus Platnick & Shadab, 1974 – Haiti
- Trachelas falsus Haddad & Lyle, 2025 – Ivory Coast, Nigeria, Tanzania, South Africa
- Trachelas fanjingshan Zhang, Fu & Zhu, 2009 – China
- Trachelas fasciae Zhang, Fu & Zhu, 2009 – China
- Trachelas femoralis Simon, 1898 – St. Vincent
- Trachelas fuscus Platnick & Shadab, 1974 – Mexico
- Trachelas gaoligongensis Jin, Yin & Zhang, 2017 – China
- Trachelas giganteus Platnick & Shadab, 1974 – Jamaica
- Trachelas gigapophysis Jin, Yin & Zhang, 2017 – China
- Trachelas gloriamarielae D. Chamé-Vázquez & E. R. Chamé-Vázquez, 2025 – Mexico
- Trachelas hamatus Platnick & Shadab, 1974 – Mexico
- Trachelas hassleri Gertsch, 1942 – Guyana
- Trachelas himalayensis Biswas, 1993 – India
- Trachelas huachucanus Gertsch, 1942 – United States, Mexico
- Trachelas humus Haddad & Lyle, 2025 – Namibia, South Africa
- Trachelas inclinatus Platnick & Shadab, 1974 – Cuba
- Trachelas jamaicensis Gertsch, 1942 – Jamaica
- Trachelas japonicus Bösenberg & Strand, 1906 – Russia (Far East), China, Korea, Japan
- Trachelas kavanaughi Tang, Yan, Zhao & Peng, 2024 – China
- Trachelas lanceolatus F. O. Pickard-Cambridge, 1899 – Mexico
- Trachelas latus Platnick & Shadab, 1974 – Mexico, Guatemala
- Trachelas leggi Haddad & Lyle, 2025 – South Africa
- Trachelas longinquus Haddad & Lyle, 2025 – Central African Rep.
- Trachelas mexicanus Banks, 1898 – United States, Mexico
- Trachelas minor O. Pickard-Cambridge, 1872 – Mediterranean to Central Asia, Sierra Leone, Liberia (type species)
- Trachelas mombachensis Leister & Miller, 2015 – Nicaragua
- Trachelas mulcetus Chickering, 1973 – Jamaica
- Trachelas nanyueensis Yin, 2012 – China
- Trachelas niger Mello-Leitão, 1922 – Brazil
- Trachelas nigrifemur Mello-Leitão, 1941 – Colombia
- Trachelas oculus Platnick & Shadab, 1974 – Cuba
- Trachelas odoreus Rivera-Quiroz & Álvarez-Padilla, 2015 – Mexico
- Trachelas oreophilus Simon, 1906 – India, Sri Lanka
- Trachelas organatus Platnick & Shadab, 1974 – United States, Mexico
- Trachelas pacificus Chamberlin & Ivie, 1935 – United States, Mexico
- Trachelas panamanus Chickering, 1937 – Panama
- Trachelas parallelus Platnick & Shadab, 1974 – Nicaragua
- Trachelas planus Platnick & Shadab, 1974 – Costa Rica
- Trachelas prominens Platnick & Shadab, 1974 – Mexico to Panama
- Trachelas pusillus Lessert, 1923 – South Africa, Lesotho
- Trachelas quadridens Kraus, 1955 – El Salvador, Costa Rica
- Trachelas quisquiliarum Simon, 1906 – Sri Lanka
- Trachelas robustus Keyserling, 1891 – Brazil
- Trachelas rotundus Platnick & Shadab, 1974 – Mexico
- Trachelas rugosus Keyserling, 1891 – Brazil
- Trachelas russellsmithi Haddad & Lyle, 2025 – Ethiopia
- Trachelas santaemartae Schmidt, 1971 – Colombia
- Trachelas scutatus Haddad & Lyle, 2025 – Ghana, Nigeria
- Trachelas shilinensis Jin, Yin & Zhang, 2017 – China
- Trachelas similis F. O. Pickard-Cambridge, 1899 – USA to Costa Rica
- Trachelas sinensis Chen, Peng & Zhao, 1995 – China
- Trachelas sinuosus Platnick & Shadab, 1974 – United States
- Trachelas smithi Haddad & Lyle, 2025 – Kenay
- Trachelas speciosus Banks, 1898 – Mexico
- Trachelas spicus Platnick & Shadab, 1974 – Mexico
- Trachelas spinulatus F. O. Pickard-Cambridge, 1899 – Guatemala, El Salvador, Nicaragua
- Trachelas spirifer F. O. Pickard-Cambridge, 1899 – Guatemala, Honduras
- Trachelas submissus Gertsch, 1942 – Paraguay
- Trachelas sylvae Caporiacco, 1949 – Cameroon, DR Congo, Uganda, Kenya
- Trachelas tanasevitchi Marusik & Kovblyuk, 2010 – Russia (Far East)
- Trachelas tomaculus Platnick & Shadab, 1974 – Cuba, Haiti
- Trachelas tranquillus (Hentz, 1847) – Canada, United States
- Trachelas transversus F. O. Pickard-Cambridge, 1899 – Mexico, Costa Rica
- Trachelas triangulus Platnick & Shadab, 1974 – Panama
- Trachelas tridentatus Mello-Leitão, 1947 – Brazil
- Trachelas trifidus Platnick & Shadab, 1974 – Panama
- Trachelas truncatulus F. O. Pickard-Cambridge, 1899 – Mexico
- Trachelas uniaculeatus Schmidt, 1956 – Canary Islands
- Trachelas ventriosus Tang, Yan, Zhao & Peng, 2024 – China
- Trachelas vitiosus Keyserling, 1891 – Brazil
- Trachelas volutus Gertsch, 1935 – United States, Mexico
- Trachelas vulcani Simon, 1896 – China, Japan, Indonesia (Java, Moluccas)
- Trachelas zhui Li, Wang, Zhang & Chen, 2019 – China
