= Oesyperus =

Scientific classification
- Domain: Eukaryota
- Kingdom: Animalia
- Phylum: Arthropoda
- Class: Insecta
- Order: Coleoptera
- Suborder: Adephaga
- Family: Carabidae
- Subfamily: Harpalinae
- Tribe: Harpalini
- Subtribe: Harpalina
- Genus: Oesyperus; Andrewes, 1923

Synonyms
- Merklia N.Ito, 2004; Merklophonus N.Ito, 2005

Genus of beetles

Oesyperus is a genus in the ground beetle family Carabidae. There are at least three described species in Oesyperus, found in India.

== Species ==
These three species belong to the genus Oesyperus:

- Oesyperus planus Andrewes, 1923
- Oesyperus pygmaeus Andrewes, 1923
- Oesyperus unctulus Andrewes, 1923
