= Carabus perrini =

Scientific classification
- Kingdom: Animalia
- Phylum: Arthropoda
- Class: Insecta
- Order: Coleoptera
- Suborder: Adephaga
- Family: Carabidae
- Genus: Carabus
- Species: C. perrini

Binomial name
- Carabus perrini Dejean, 1831

Species of beetle

Carabus perrini is a species of beetle in the family Carabidae that can be found in South Russia, Ukraine, and Georgia.

== Subspecies ==
- Carabus perrini perrini Dejean, 1831
- Carabus perrini planus Gehin, 1885
