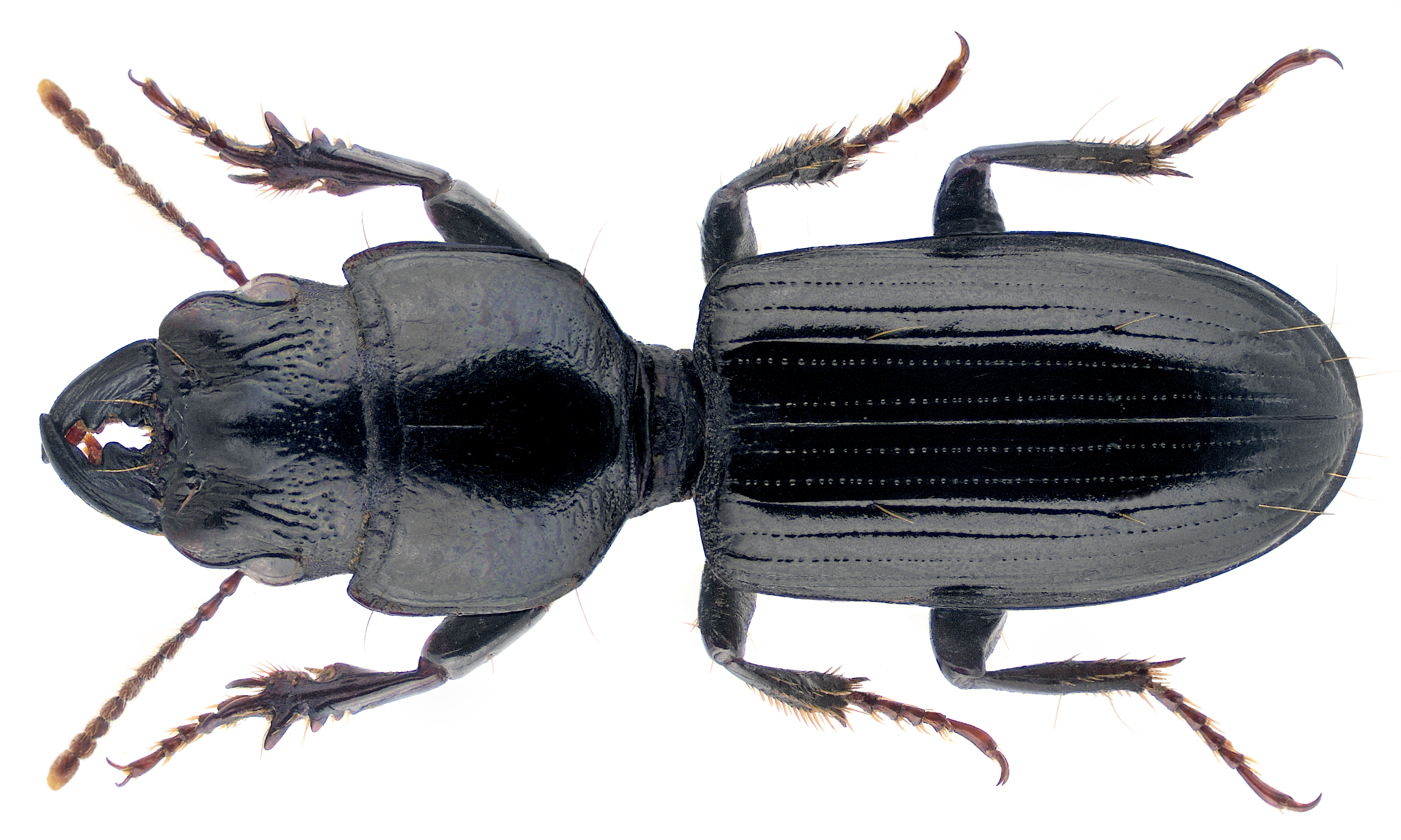

Scientific classification
- Kingdom: Animalia
- Phylum: Arthropoda
- Class: Insecta
- Order: Coleoptera
- Suborder: Adephaga
- Family: Carabidae
- Subfamily: Scaritinae
- Tribe: Scaritini
- Subtribe: Scaritina
- Genus: Distichus; Motschulsky, 1858

Subgenera
- Baenningostichus Dostal, 1999; Distichus Motschulsky, 1858; Lophogenius Motschulsky, 1858

= Distichus =

Genus of beetles

Distichus is a genus in the ground beetle family Carabidae. There are more than 30 described species in Distichus, found in Africa, Europe, Asia, South America, and Central America.

== Species ==
These 37 species belong to the genus Distichus:

- Distichus amazonicus Bänninger, 1933
- Distichus angustiformis (Chaudoir, 1880)
- Distichus becvari Dostal, 1999
- Distichus bisquadripunctatus Klug, 1862
- Distichus bolivianus Bänninger, 1933
- Distichus borneensis Bänninger, 1928
- Distichus dicaelus Chaudoir, 1880
- Distichus differens (Bänninger, 1956)
- Distichus ebeninus (Lynch Arribálzaga, 1878)
- Distichus evasus Bänninger, 1932
- Distichus gagatinus (Dejean, 1831)
- Distichus khalafi (H. A. Ali), 1967
- Distichus lacordairei (Dejean, 1831)
- Distichus laticeps Andrewes, 1929
- Distichus macleayi Andrewes, 1919
- Distichus mahratta (Andrewes, 1929)
- Distichus mediocris (Fairmaire, 1901)
- Distichus morio (Dejean, 1831)
- Distichus nevermanni (Bänninger, 1938)
- Distichus octocoelus (Chaudoir, 1855)
- Distichus orientalis (Bonelli, 1813)
- Distichus pachycerus Chaudoir, 1880
- Distichus parvus Wiedemann, 1823
- Distichus perrieri (Fairmaire, 1901)
- Distichus peruvianus (Dejean, 1831)
- Distichus picicornis Dejean, 1831
- Distichus planus Bonelli, 1813
- Distichus platyops Andrewes, 1932
- Distichus punctaticeps (Lynch Arribálzaga, 1878)
- Distichus puncticollis Chaudoir, 1855
- Distichus rectifrons H. W. Bates, 1892
- Distichus semicarinatus (Chaudoir, 1880)
- Distichus septentrionalis H. W. Bates, 1881
- Distichus smithi (Linell, 1898)
- Distichus striaticeps Chaudoir, 1880
- Distichus trivialis Chaudoir, 1880
- Distichus uncinatus Andrewes, 1923
