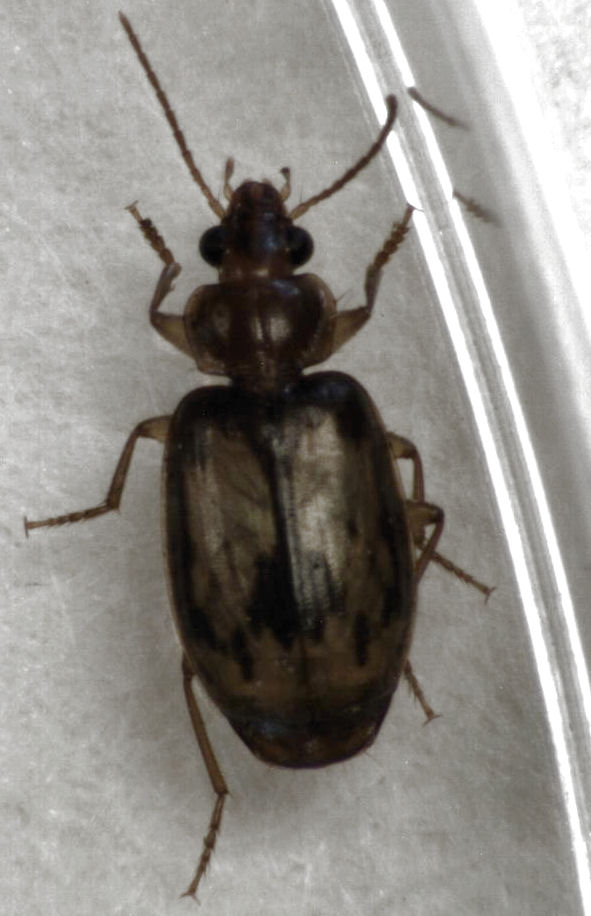
- Philophlaeus luculentus (live adult)

Scientific classification
- Kingdom: Animalia
- Phylum: Arthropoda
- Class: Insecta
- Order: Coleoptera
- Suborder: Adephaga
- Family: Carabidae
- Subfamily: Lebiinae
- Genus: Philophlaeus; Chaudoir, 1844

= Philophlaeus =

Genus of beetles

Philophlaeus is a genus of beetles in the family Carabidae, found in Australia and New Zealand. The genus contains the following species:

- Philophlaeus angulatus Chaudoir, 1869
- Philophlaeus australasiae Chaudoir, 1869
- Philophlaeus australis (Dejean, 1826)
- Philophlaeus bivittatus Sloane, 1920
- Philophlaeus brunnipennis W.J.Macleay, 1871
- Philophlaeus confertus Blackburn, 1892
- Philophlaeus discorufus Sloane, 1898
- Philophlaeus distinguendus Chaudoir, 1869
- Philophlaeus eucalypti Germar, 1848
- Philophlaeus fuscipennis Germar, 1848
- Philophlaeus immaculatus Chaudoir, 1869
- Philophlaeus intermedius Chaudoir, 1869
- Philophlaeus laticollis Blackburn, 1892
- Philophlaeus luculentus (Newman, 1842)
- Philophlaeus maculatus W.J.Macleay, 1871
- Philophlaeus moestus (Chaudoir, 1869)
- Philophlaeus monticola Blackburn, 1892
- Philophlaeus myrmecophilus Lea, 1912
- Philophlaeus obtusus Chaudoir, 1869
- Philophlaeus occidentalis Blackburn, 1890
- Philophlaeus opaciceps Blackburn, 1890
- Philophlaeus ornatus Blackburn, 1892
- Philophlaeus planus (Newman, 1840)
- Philophlaeus puberulus Chaudoir, 1869
- Philophlaeus pygmaeus Blackburn, 1892
- Philophlaeus quadripennis Chaudoir, 1869
- Philophlaeus rectangulus Chaudoir, 1869
- Philophlaeus simsoni Sloane, 1920
- Philophlaeus sydneyensis Blackburn, 1892
- Philophlaeus unicolor Chaudoir, 1869
- Philophlaeus vittatus W.J.Macleay, 1871
