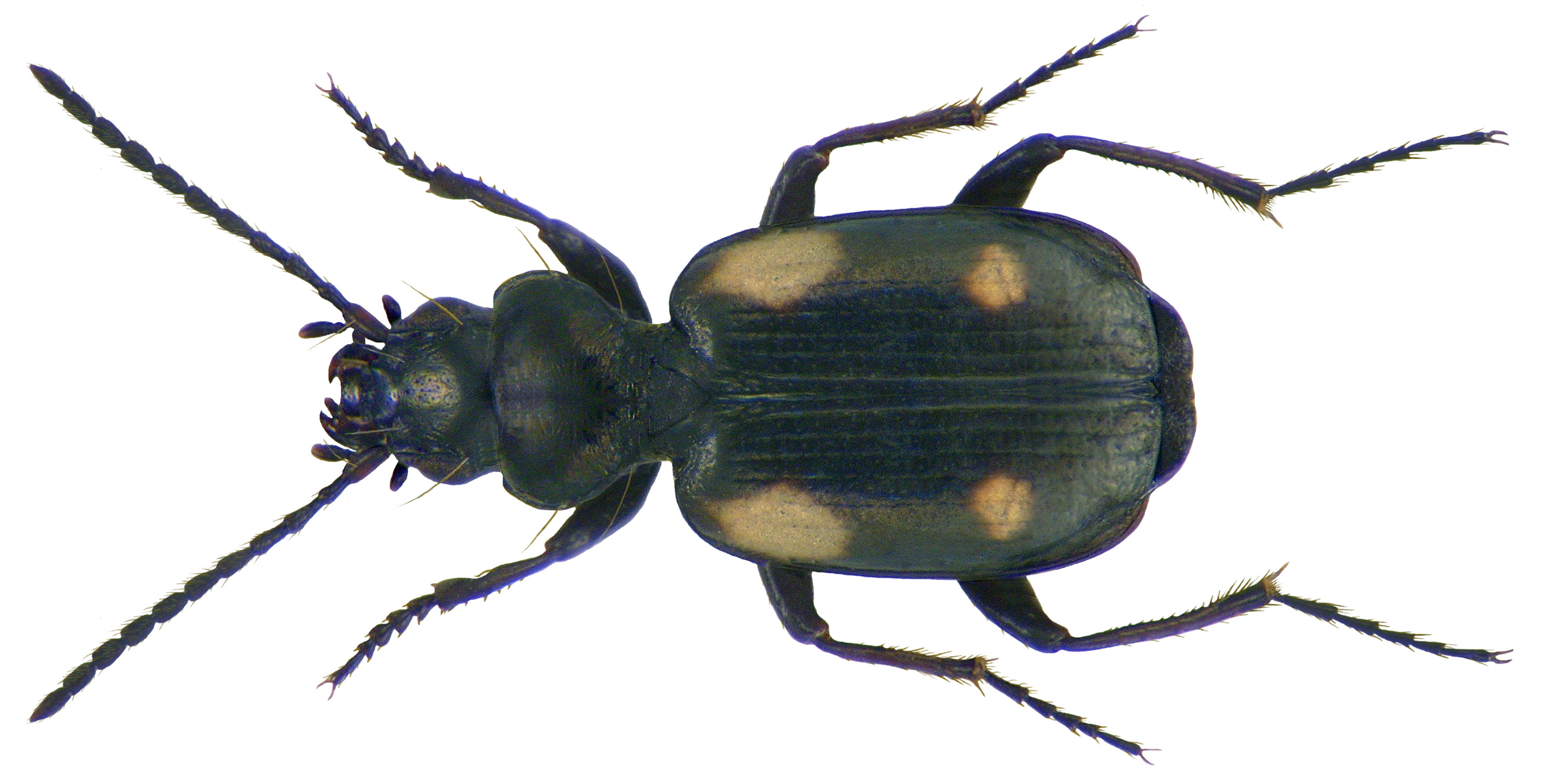

Scientific classification
- Kingdom: Animalia
- Phylum: Arthropoda
- Clade: Pancrustacea
- Class: Insecta
- Order: Coleoptera
- Suborder: Adephaga
- Family: Carabidae
- Subfamily: Lebiinae
- Tribe: Lebiini
- Subtribe: Lionychina
- Genus: Lionychus; Wissmann, 1846

Subgenera
- Lionychus Wissmann, 1846; Paralionychus Jeannel, 1949

Synonyms
- Lyonichus Desmarest, 1851-22; Paralionychus Jeannel, 1949

= Lionychus =

Genus of beetles

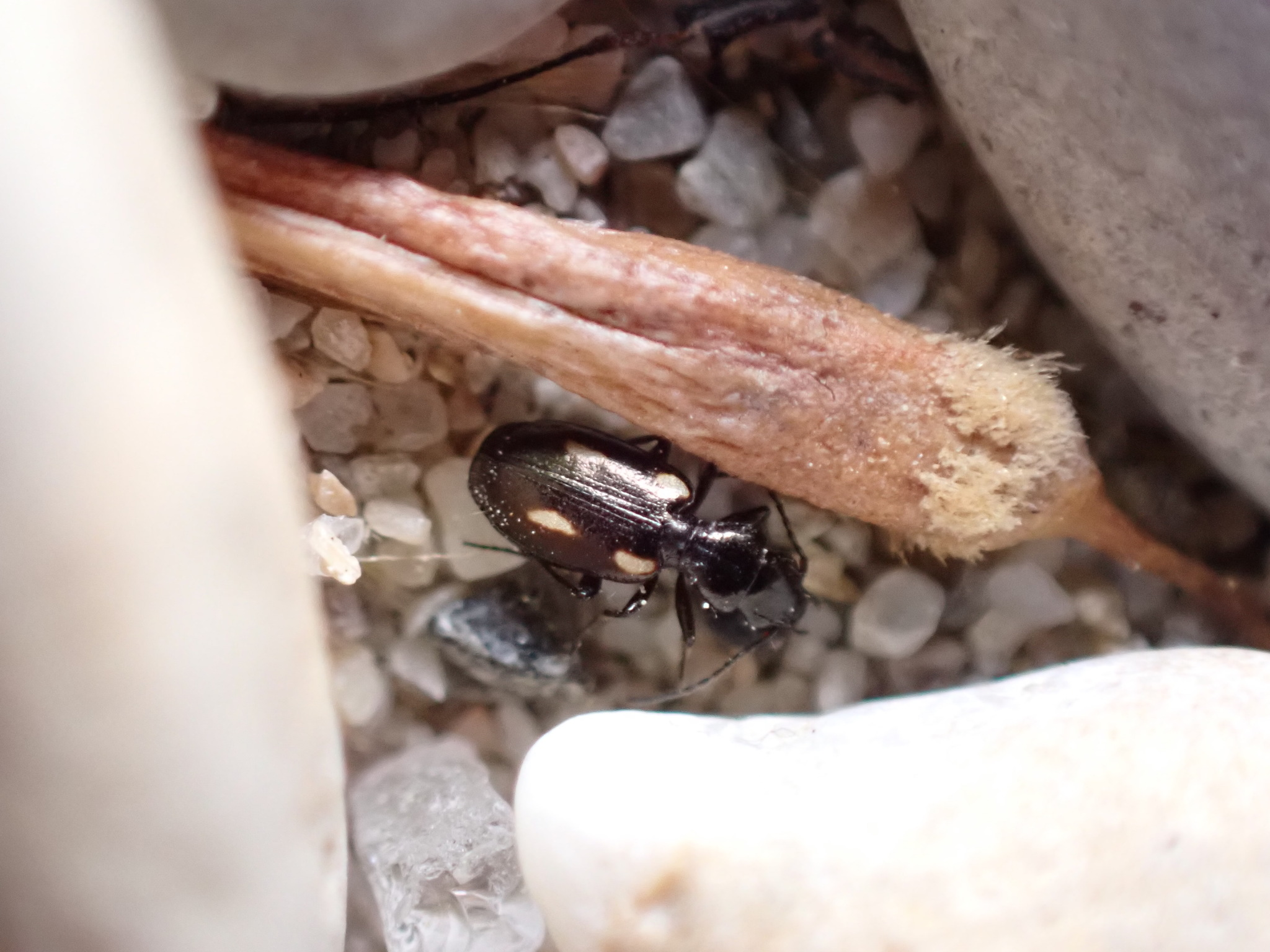
Lionychus quadrillum, France

Lionychus is a genus in the ground beetle family Carabidae. There are at least 20 described species in Lionychus.

== Species ==
These 20 species belong to the genus Lionychus:

- Lionychus albivittis Bates, 1886 (Sri Lanka)
- Lionychus albonotatus (Dejean, 1825) (Europe, North Africa, Israel)
- Lionychus anamalai Jedlicka, 1969 (India)
- Lionychus basalis Péringuey, 1896 (Zimbabwe)
- Lionychus beccarii Gestro, 1889 (Saudi Arabia)
- Lionychus bivittatus Fairmaire, 1899 (Madagascar)
- Lionychus chujoi Jedlicka, 1966 (Thailand)
- Lionychus cinctus Chaudoir, 1848 (Africa)
- Lionychus damarensis Kuntzen, 1919 (Namibia)
- Lionychus fleischeri Reitter, 1908 (Italy, Greece, Russia)
- Lionychus himalayicus Andrewes, 1931 (Nepal, India)
- Lionychus horni Dupuis, 1913 (Sri Lanka)
- Lionychus laetulus Péringuey, 1904 (South Africa)
- Lionychus laosensis Jedlicka, 1966 (Laos)
- Lionychus marginellus Schmidt-Goebel, 1846 (China, Myanmar)
- Lionychus maritimus Fairmaire, 1862 (France, Spain, Italy, Albania)
- Lionychus orientalis K.Daniel, 1900 (Sicily, Italy, Greece, Turkey, Cyprus, Iran, Azerbaijan)
- Lionychus planus Mateu, 1978 (India)
- Lionychus quadrillum (Duftschmid, 1812) (Palearctic)
- Lionychus sturmii (Gené, 1836) (France, Italy)
