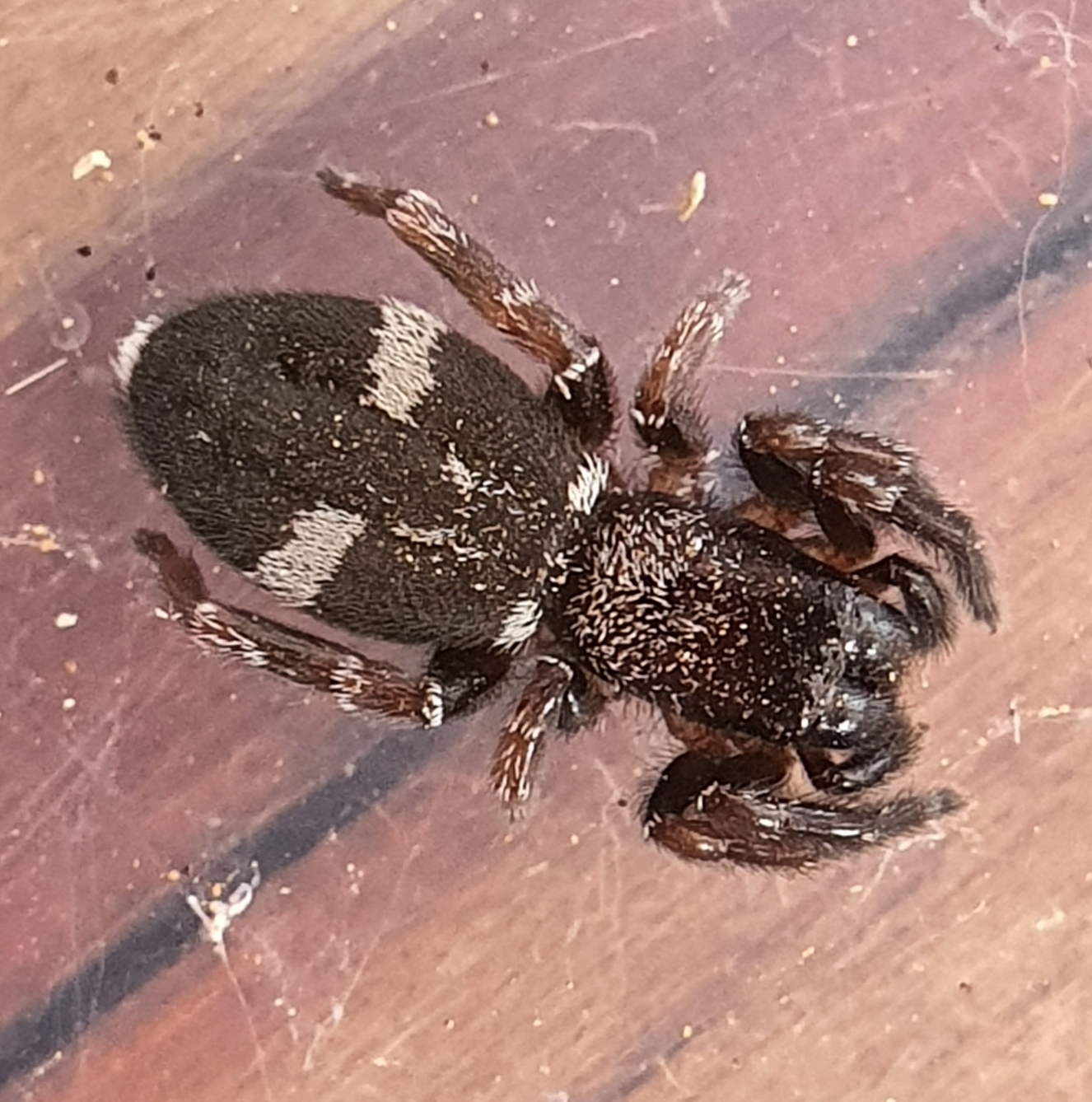
- Penestomus egazini
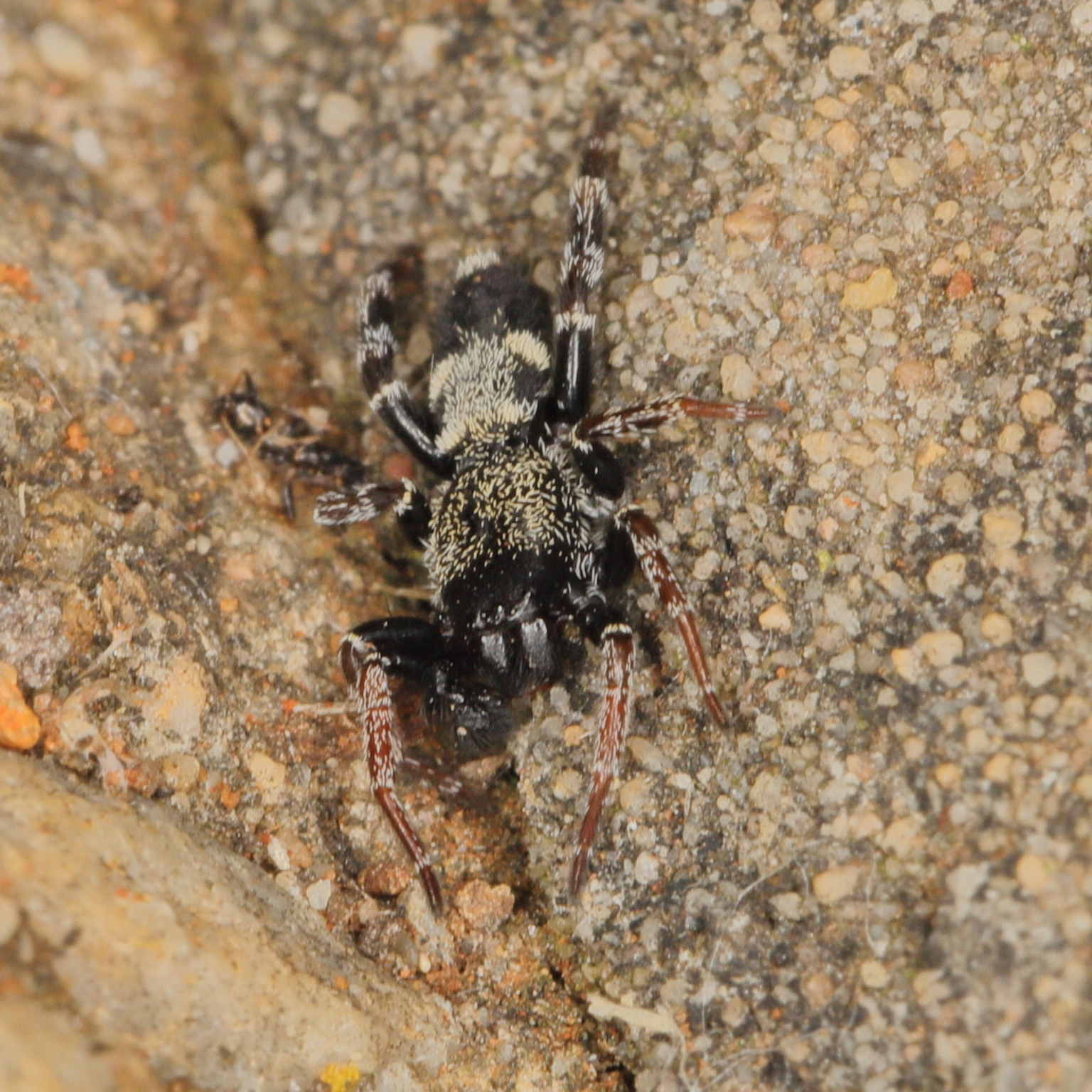
- Penestomus stilleri

Scientific classification
- Kingdom: Animalia
- Phylum: Arthropoda
- Subphylum: Chelicerata
- Class: Arachnida
- Order: Araneae
- Infraorder: Araneomorphae
- Family: Penestomidae; Simon, 1903
- Genus: Penestomus; Simon, 1902

Type species
- Penestomus planus Simon, 1902

Species
- 9, see text

Synonyms
- Wajane Lehtinen, 1967

= Penestomus =

Genus of spiders

Penestomus is a genus of African araneomorph spiders in the family Penestomidae, and was first described by Eugène Louis Simon in 1902.

The genus is known only from South Africa and Lesotho, with eight of the nine species endemic to South Africa.

== Taxonomy ==
The genus was formerly included in the family Eresidae, but was elevated to its own family in 2010. It is now considered closer to Zodariidae.

== Description ==
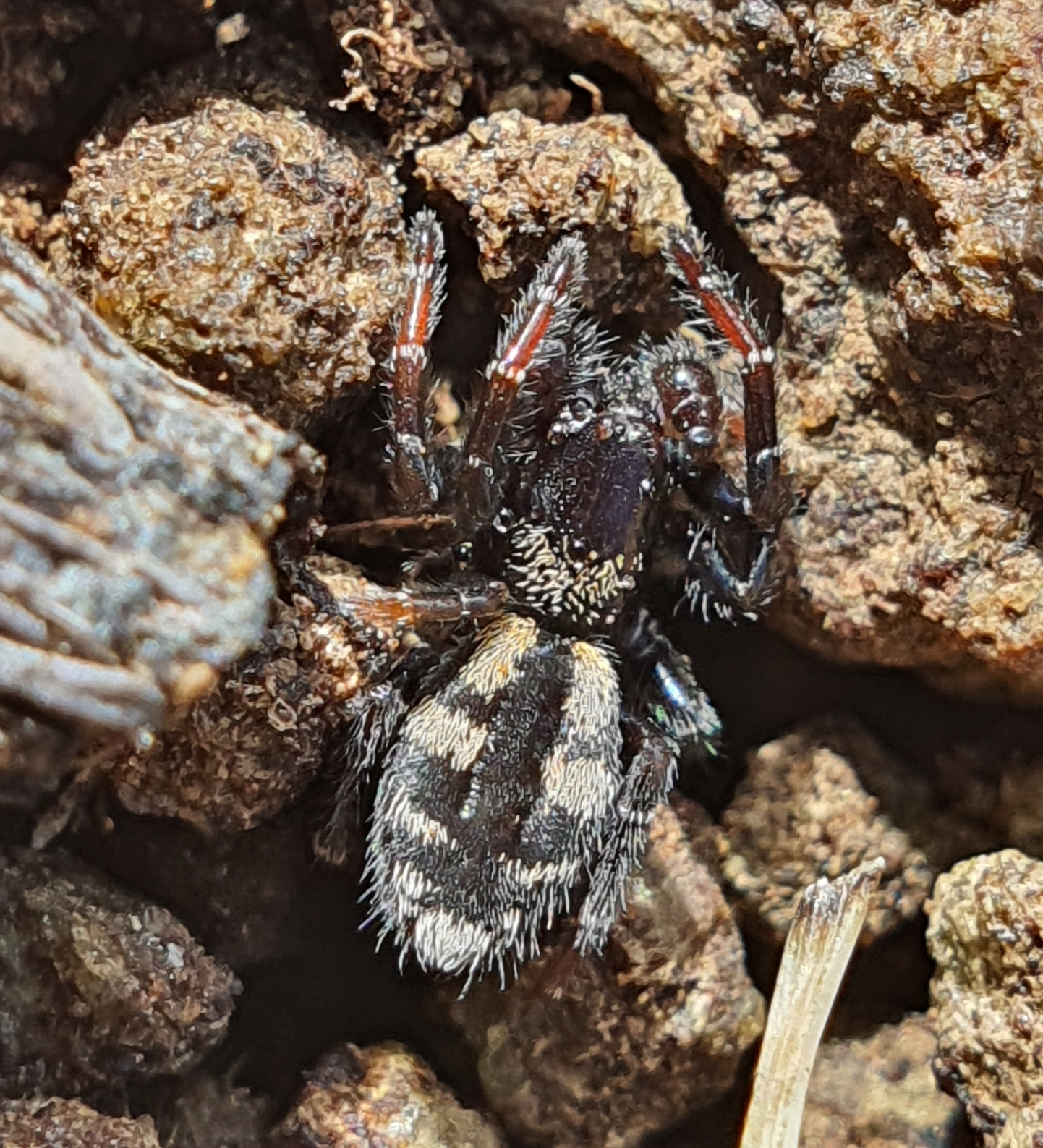
male P. montanus

Penestomus spiders are distinguished from Eresidae by their flat body and the position of the posterior lateral eyes, which are less than three eye diameters behind the posterior median eyes (compared to several eye diameters in Eresidae). Total length ranges from 3-6 mm.

The carapace is subrectangular with a shallow ovoid fovea. They have eight eyes arranged in two rows, with the posterior eye row slightly recurved and more widely spaced than the anterior eyes. The sternum is ovoid, longer than wide, and not fused to the labium. The promargin of the fang furrow is armed with four to six teeth increasing in size from the base of the fang to the penultimate tooth, while the retromargin has two to three teeth.

== Ecology ==
Little is known about Penestomus ecology. They live in silk retreats in tunnels in boulders and under debris on the ground. Prey remains include members of the Formicidae, Curculionidae, and small Gryllidae.

== Conservation ==
Most species in the genus are poorly known, with only two species (P. egazini and P. montanus) known from both sexes. Seven species are listed as Data Deficient, while P. egazini and P. montanus are considered Rare due to their restricted distributions.

== Species ==
As of September 2025 it contains nine species, found only in Lesotho and South Africa:

- Penestomus armatus (Lehtinen, 1967) – South Africa
- Penestomus croeseri Dippenaar-Schoeman, 1989 – South Africa
- Penestomus egazini Miller, Griswold & Haddad, 2010 – South Africa
- Penestomus kruger Miller, Griswold & Haddad, 2010 – South Africa
- Penestomus montanus Miller, Griswold & Haddad, 2010 – South Africa, Lesotho
- Penestomus planus Simon, 1902 (type) – South Africa
- Penestomus prendinii Miller, Griswold & Haddad, 2010 – South Africa
- Penestomus stilleri (Dippenaar-Schoeman, 1989) – South Africa
- Penestomus zulu Miller, Griswold & Haddad, 2010 – South Africa
