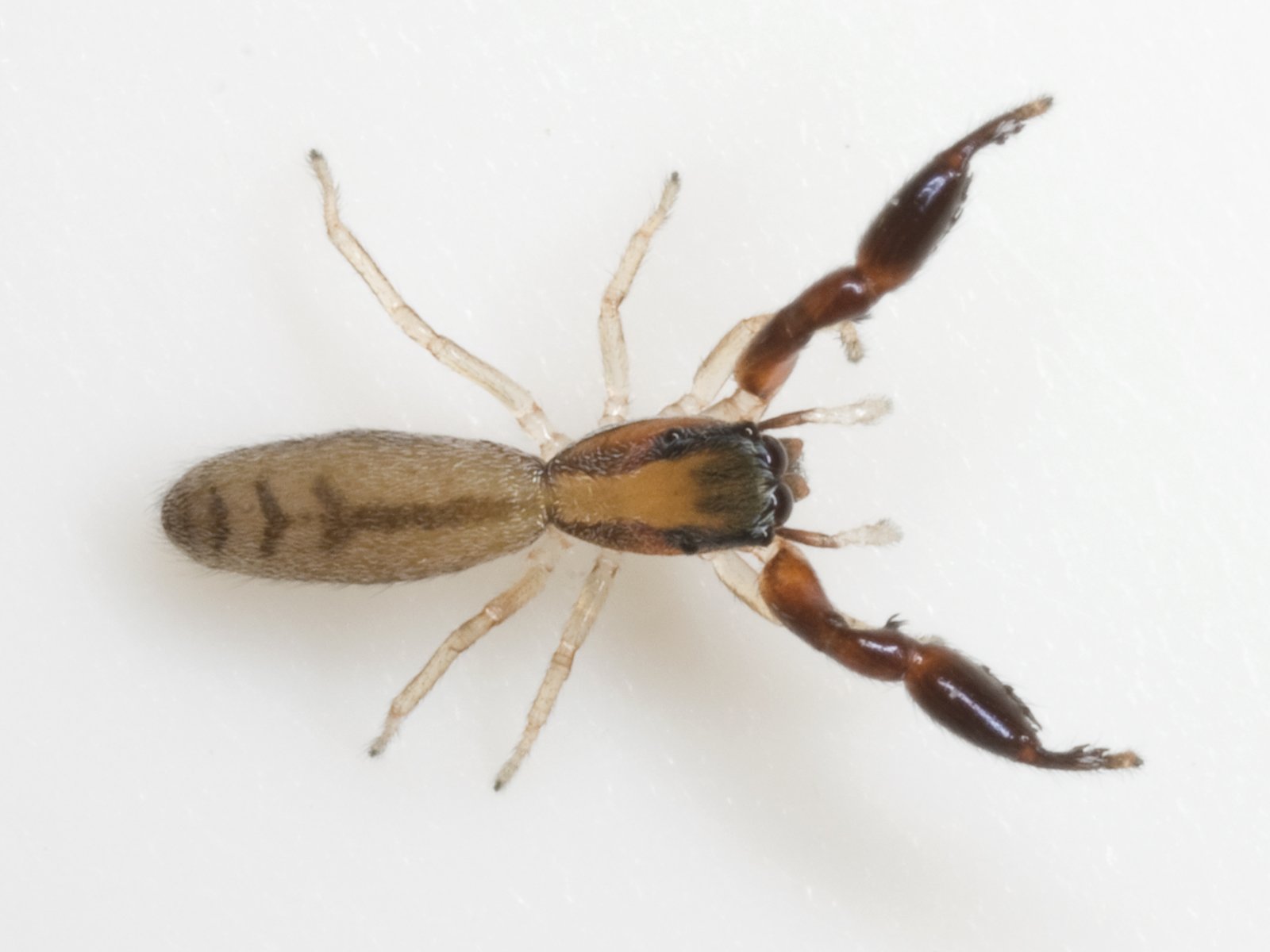
- Cheliferoides longimanus

Scientific classification
- Kingdom: Animalia
- Phylum: Arthropoda
- Subphylum: Chelicerata
- Class: Arachnida
- Order: Araneae
- Infraorder: Araneomorphae
- Family: Salticidae
- Subfamily: Salticinae
- Genus: Cheliferoides; F. O. Pickard-Cambridge, 1901

Type species
- C. segmentatus F. O. Pickard-Cambridge, 1901

Species
- C. longimanus Gertsch, 1936 – USA; C. planus Chickering, 1946 – Panama; C. segmentatus F. O. Pickard-Cambridge, 1901 – USA to Guatemala

= Cheliferoides =

Genus of spiders

Cheliferoides is a genus of jumping spiders that was first described by Frederick Octavius Pickard-Cambridge in 1901. As of June 2019 it contains only three species, found only in Guatemala, Panama, and the United States: C. longimanus, C. planus, and C. segmentatus.
