= Penestomus planus =

Scientific classification
- Kingdom: Animalia
- Phylum: Arthropoda
- Subphylum: Chelicerata
- Class: Arachnida
- Order: Araneae
- Infraorder: Araneomorphae
- Family: Penestomidae
- Genus: Penestomus
- Species: P. planus

Binomial name
- Penestomus planus Simon, 1902

Species of spider

Penestomus planus is a species of spider in the family Penestomidae and the type species of the genus Penestomus. It is endemic to South Africa.

== Distribution ==
Penestomus planus has been recorded from the Eastern Cape and Western Cape provinces of South Africa, including Willowmore, Dunbrody, and Mossel Bay.

== Habitat ==
The species inhabits the Fynbos and Nama Karoo biomes, where it constructs retreat-webs underneath rocks.

== Description ==
Only females of Penestomus planus are known to science. The carapace is orange, lighter posteriorly with a smooth texture, covered by fine black setae with broad white setae concentrated in the thoracic and fovea regions. The sternum is pale yellow. The chelicerae are dark red with six promarginal teeth and two retromarginal teeth. The legs are dusky yellow basally, with anterior legs orange distally and posterior legs yellow distally. The opisthosoma appears pale, but details are obscured due to specimen damage.

== Conservation ==
The species is listed as Data Deficient by the IUCN due to taxonomic reasons, as males remain unknown and the current distribution range requires further study. All known specimens were collected prior to 1902.
