= Carabus perrini planus =

Scientific classification
- Domain: Eukaryota
- Kingdom: Animalia
- Phylum: Arthropoda
- Class: Insecta
- Order: Coleoptera
- Suborder: Adephaga
- Family: Carabidae
- Genus: Carabus
- Species: C. perrini
- Subspecies: C. p. planus

Trinomial name
- Carabus perrini planus Gehin, 1885

Synonyms
- Carabus campestris Fischer, 1822; Carabus parallelus Fischer, 1844 "South Russia"; Carabus planatus Motschulsky, 1850 "South Russia"; Carabus transcaucasicus Csiki, 1927

Subspecies of beetle

Carabus perrini planus is a subspecies of black-coloured beetle in the family Carabidae that can be found in Georgia, Russia, and Ukraine.
