= List of Gallieniellidae species =

This page lists all described species of the spider family Gallieniellidae accepted by the World Spider Catalog as of January 2021.

== Austrachelas ==
Austrachelas Lawrence, 1938

- A. bergi Haddad, Lyle, Bosselaers & Ramírez, 2009 — South Africa
- A. entabeni Haddad & Mbo, 2017 — South Africa
- A. incertus Lawrence, 1938 (type) — South Africa
- A. kalaharinus Haddad, Lyle, Bosselaers & Ramírez, 2009 — South Africa
- A. merwei Haddad, Lyle, Bosselaers & Ramírez, 2009 — South Africa
- A. natalensis Lawrence, 1942 — South Africa
- A. pondoensis Haddad, Lyle, Bosselaers & Ramírez, 2009 — South Africa
- A. reavelli Haddad, Lyle, Bosselaers & Ramírez, 2009 — South Africa
- A. sexoculatus Haddad, Lyle, Bosselaers & Ramírez, 2009 — South Africa
- A. wassenaari Haddad, Lyle, Bosselaers & Ramírez, 2009 — South Africa

== Drassodella ==
Drassodella Hewitt, 1916

- D. amatola Mbo & Haddad, 2019 — South Africa
- D. aurostriata Mbo & Haddad, 2019 — South Africa
- D. baviaans Mbo & Haddad, 2019 — South Africa
- D. flava Mbo & Haddad, 2019 — South Africa
- D. guttata Mbo & Haddad, 2019 — South Africa
- D. lotzi Mbo & Haddad, 2019 — South Africa
- D. maculata Mbo & Haddad, 2019 — South Africa
- D. melana Tucker, 1923 — South Africa
- D. montana Mbo & Haddad, 2019 — South Africa
- D. purcelli Tucker, 1923 — South Africa
- D. quinquelabecula Tucker, 1923 — South Africa
- D. salisburyi Hewitt, 1916 (type) — South Africa
- D. septemmaculata (Strand, 1909) — South Africa
- D. tenebrosa Lawrence, 1938 — South Africa
- D. tolkieni Mbo & Haddad, 2019 — South Africa
- D. transversa Mbo & Haddad, 2019 — South Africa
- D. trilineata Mbo & Haddad, 2019 — South Africa
- D. vasivulva Tucker, 1923 — South Africa
- D. venda Mbo & Haddad, 2019 — South Africa

== Galianoella ==
Galianoella Goloboff, 2000

- G. leucostigma (Mello-Leitão, 1941) (type) — Argentina

== Gallieniella ==
Gallieniella Millot, 1947

- G. betroka Platnick, 1984 — Madagascar
- G. blanci Platnick, 1984 — Madagascar
- G. jocquei Platnick, 1984 — Comoros
- G. mygaloides Millot, 1947 (type) — Madagascar

== Legendrena ==
Legendrena Platnick, 1984

- L. angavokely Platnick, 1984 (type) — Madagascar
- L. perinet Platnick, 1984 — Madagascar
- L. rolandi Platnick, 1984 — Madagascar
- L. rothi Platnick, 1995 — Madagascar
- L. spiralis Platnick, 1995 — Madagascar
- L. steineri Platnick, 1990 — Madagascar
- L. tamatave Platnick, 1984 — Madagascar

== Meedo ==
Meedo Main, 1987

- M. bluff Platnick, 2002 — Australia (New South Wales)
- M. booti Platnick, 2002 — Australia (New South Wales)
- M. broadwater Platnick, 2002 — Australia (Queensland)
- M. cohuna Platnick, 2002 — eastern Australia
- M. flinders Platnick, 2002 — Australia (South Australia)
- M. gympie Platnick, 2002 — Australia (Queensland, New South Wales)
- M. harveyi Platnick, 2002 — Australia (Western Australia)
- M. houstoni Main, 1987 (type) — Australia (Western Australia)
- M. mullaroo Platnick, 2002 — Australia (South Australia, Queensland to Victoria)
- M. munmorah Platnick, 2002 — Australia (New South Wales)
- M. ovtsharenkoi Platnick, 2002 — Australia (Western Australia)
- M. yarragin Platnick, 2002 — Australia (Western Australia)
- M. yeni Platnick, 2002 — Australia (Western Australia, South Australia, Victoria)

== Neato ==
Neato Platnick, 2002

- N. arid Platnick, 2002 — Australia (Western Australia)
- N. barrine Platnick, 2002 — Australia (Queensland)
- N. beerwah Platnick, 2002 — Australia (Queensland, New South Wales)
- N. kioloa Platnick, 2002 — Australia (New South Wales, Victoria)
- N. palms Platnick, 2002 — Australia (New South Wales)
- N. raveni Platnick, 2002 — Australia (Queensland)
- N. walli Platnick, 2002 (type) — Australia (Queensland, New South Wales, Victoria)

== Oreo ==
Oreo Platnick, 2002

- O. bushbay Platnick, 2002 — Australia (Western Australia)
- O. capensis Platnick, 2002 — Australia (Western Australia)
- O. kidman Platnick, 2002 — Australia (Northern Territory)
- O. muncoonie Platnick, 2002 — Australia (Queensland)
- O. renmark Platnick, 2002 (type) — Australia (South Australia, Queensland to Victoria)

== Peeto ==
Peeto Platnick, 2002

- P. rodmani Platnick, 2002 (type) — Australia (Queensland)

== Questo ==
Questo Platnick, 2002

- Q. annuello Platnick, 2002 (type) — Australia (Victoria)
