= Arcoona (disambiguation) =

Arcoona is a pastoral lease in South Australia.

Arcoona may also refer to.

== Places ==
=== Australia ===
- Arcoona, a pastoral lease in Western Australia
- Arcoona, South Australia, a locality
- Arcoona Plateau, a sub-region in the Gawler IBRA region

=== Elsewhere ===
- A regio on the asteroid, 25143 Itokawa

== Ships ==
- SS Arcoona (1924), the former name for SS Arkaba

== Common and scientific names for some Australian animals ==
- Ctenophorus fionni, commonly known as the Arcoona Rock Dragon
- Fissarena arcoona, a spider in the Genus Fissarena
- Lamponega arcoona, a spider in the Genus Lamponidae
- Longrita arcoona, a spider in the Genus Longrita
- Wugigarra arcoona, a spider in the Genus Wugigarra

== See also ==
- Aroona (disambiguation)
