= Aroona (disambiguation) =

Aroona may refer to:

== Places in Australia ==
=== Queensland ===
- Aroona, Queensland, a suburb

=== South Australia ===
- Aroona Dam, a water storage facility in the locality of Leigh Creek
  - Aroona Sanctuary, a private protected area associated with the Aroona Dam
- Aroona Station, a pastoral lease in the Flinders Ranges
- Aroona Valley, a valley - refer List of valleys of Australia#South Australia

== Other uses ==
- Aroona Palace, a music recording by Tinpan Orange
