= Boolathana spiralis =

Scientific classification
- Kingdom: Animalia
- Phylum: Arthropoda
- Subphylum: Chelicerata
- Class: Arachnida
- Order: Araneae
- Infraorder: Araneomorphae
- Family: Trachycosmidae
- Genus: Boolathana
- Species: B. spiralis

Binomial name
- Boolathana spiralis Platnick, 2002

Species of spider

Boolathana spiralis is one of two species of western Australian spiders in the family Trochanteriidae. The name refers to the coiled tip of the middle apophysis, one of the defining characteristics of the species. It is mostly red to brown, the colour fading from dark on the top front to gray in the sides and bottom.
