= Oreo (disambiguation) =

An Oreo is a sandwich cookie produced by Nabisco.

Oreo may also refer to:

== Animals ==
- Oreo (spider), a genus of Australian spiders
- Oreosomatidae, a family of fish commonly called oreos
- Oreo cow, a nickname for the Scottish Belted Galloway

== Arts, entertainment, and media ==
- Oreo (novel), a 1974 novel by Fran Ross
- The Oreo, a sculpture on the Villanova University campus, Pennsylvania

== Other uses ==
- Oreo Cookie (slang), an ethnic slur for a black person who "acts white"
- Oreo O's, a breakfast cereal based on the Oreo cookie
- Oreus (or "Oreos"), an ancient Greek settlement
- Android Oreo, Android Operating System 8.0
- Other Real Estate Owned (OREO), real estate a bank owns that has generally been acquired through foreclosure
