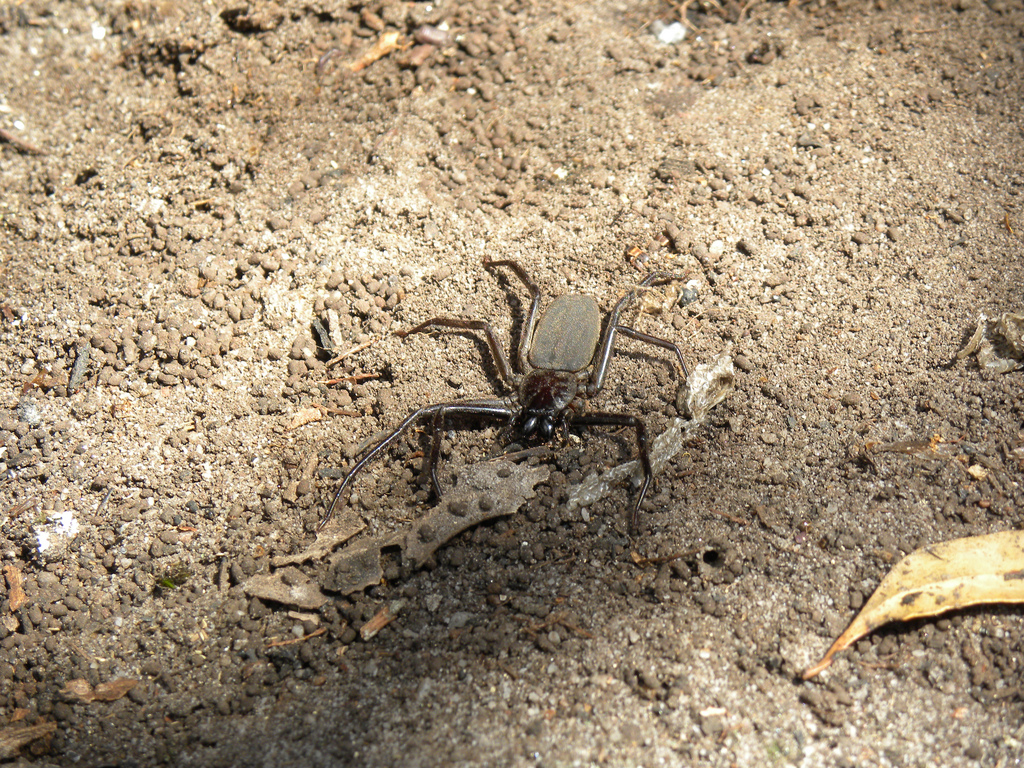
- M. plagusius

Scientific classification
- Kingdom: Animalia
- Phylum: Arthropoda
- Subphylum: Chelicerata
- Class: Arachnida
- Order: Araneae
- Infraorder: Araneomorphae
- Family: Trachycosmidae
- Genus: Morebilus; Platnick

Type species
- Morebilus plagusius

Species
- 13, see text

= Morebilus =

Genus of spiders

Morebilus is a genus of spiders in the family Trachycosmidae found in southern and western Australia, first described by Norman I. Platnick in 2002. These are large spiders, with the carapace of males ranging from 10 to 16 millimeters and those of females ranging from 10 to 24 millimeters. They look similar to members of Rebilus, especially the spinneret and tarsal claw, but members of this genus have an inclined lip at the anterior edge of the sternum as well as a pair of enlarged sclerites on the coxal glands.

== Species ==
As of February 2019, it contains 13 species:

- Morebilus blackdown Platnick, 2002 – Queensland
- Morebilus coolah Platnick, 2002 – New South Wales
- Morebilus diversus (L. Koch, 1875) – Northern Australia
- Morebilus fitton Platnick, 2002 – South Australia
- Morebilus flinders Platnick, 2002 – South Australia, Victoria
- Morebilus fumosus (L. Koch, 1876) – Queensland
- Morebilus gammon Platnick, 2002 – South Australia
- Morebilus gramps Platnick, 2002 – Victoria
- Morebilus graytown Platnick, 2002 – South Australia, Victoria
- Morebilus nipping Platnick, 2002 – Queensland
- Morebilus plagusius (Walckenaer, 1837) – New South Wales, Victoria
- Morebilus swarbrecki (Dunn & Dunn, 1946) – Victoria
- Morebilus tambo Platnick, 2002 – Queensland
