= Trachytrema =

Scientific classification
- Kingdom: Animalia
- Phylum: Arthropoda
- Subphylum: Chelicerata
- Class: Arachnida
- Order: Araneae
- Infraorder: Araneomorphae
- Family: Trachycosmidae
- Genus: Trachytrema; Simon

Type species
- Trachytrema castaneum Simon, 1909

Species
- Trachytrema castaneum Simon, 1909; Trachytrema garnet Platnick, 2002

Genus of spiders

Trachytrema is a genus of spiders in the family Trachycosmidae. It was first described in 1909 by Simon. As of 2017, it contains 2 Australian species.
