= Boolathana =

Scientific classification
- Kingdom: Animalia
- Phylum: Arthropoda
- Subphylum: Chelicerata
- Class: Arachnida
- Order: Araneae
- Infraorder: Araneomorphae
- Family: Trachycosmidae
- Genus: Boolathana; Platnick, 2002

Species
- Boolathana mainae Platnick, 2002; Boolathana spiralis Platnick, 2002

Genus of spiders

Boolathana is a genus of spiders in the family Trachycosmidae found in western Australia. There are two species in the genus, Boolathana mainae and Boolathana spiralis. It is named after Boolathana Station, a pastoral lease near where the first specimen was found.
