= Trachyspina =

Scientific classification
- Kingdom: Animalia
- Phylum: Arthropoda
- Subphylum: Chelicerata
- Class: Arachnida
- Order: Araneae
- Infraorder: Araneomorphae
- Family: Trachycosmidae
- Genus: Trachyspina; Platnick

Type species
- Trachyspina capensis Platnick, 2002

Species
- 8, see text

Genus of spiders

Trachyspina is a genus of spiders in the family Trachycosmidae. It was first described in 2002 by Platnick. As of 2017, it contains 8 species, all from Australia.

== Species ==
Trachyspina comprises the following species:

- Trachyspina capensis Platnick, 2002
- Trachyspina chillimookoo Platnick, 2002
- Trachyspina daunton Platnick, 2002
- Trachyspina goongarrie Platnick, 2002
- Trachyspina illamurta Platnick, 2002
- Trachyspina madura Platnick, 2002
- Trachyspina mundaring Platnick, 2002
- Trachyspina olary Platnick, 2002
