= Desognanops =

Scientific classification
- Kingdom: Animalia
- Phylum: Arthropoda
- Subphylum: Chelicerata
- Class: Arachnida
- Order: Araneae
- Infraorder: Araneomorphae
- Family: Trachycosmidae
- Genus: Desognanops
- Species: D. humphreysi

Binomial name
- Desognanops humphreysi Platnick, 2008

Genus of spiders

Desognanops is a genus of spiders in the family Trachycosmidae. It was first described in 2008 by Platnick. As of 2017, it contains only one species, Desognanops humphreysi, found in Western Australia.
