= Austrachelas pondoensis =

Pondoland Long-Jawed Ground Spider

Scientific classification
- Kingdom: Animalia
- Phylum: Arthropoda
- Subphylum: Chelicerata
- Class: Arachnida
- Order: Araneae
- Infraorder: Araneomorphae
- Family: Gallieniellidae
- Genus: Austrachelas
- Species: A. pondoensis

Binomial name
- Austrachelas pondoensis Haddad, Lyle, Bosselaers & Ramírez, 2009

Species of spider

Austrachelas pondoensis is a species of spider in the family Gallieniellidae. It is endemic to South Africa.

== Distribution ==
Austrachelas pondoensis is endemic to the Eastern Cape province and is known only from Mzimhlava River Mouth in the Lusikisiki district at an elevation of 10 m above sea level.

== Habitat ==
The species was sampled in coastal evergreen forest in the Indian Ocean Coastal Belt Biome.

== Description ==
Both sexes are known. The opisthosoma displays mottled pale grey chevron markings.

== Conservation ==
Austrachelas pondoensis is listed as Data Deficient. The species was locally abundant at the time of collection in 1980 and is likely under-collected. It may occur in other forest patches along the Wild Coast, and additional sampling is needed to determine its range.
