= Drassodella trilineata =

Three-striped Long-Jawed Ground Spider

Scientific classification
- Kingdom: Animalia
- Phylum: Arthropoda
- Subphylum: Chelicerata
- Class: Arachnida
- Order: Araneae
- Infraorder: Araneomorphae
- Family: Gallieniellidae
- Genus: Drassodella
- Species: D. trilineata

Binomial name
- Drassodella trilineata Mbo & Haddad, 2019

Species of spider

Drassodella trilineata is a species of spider in the family Gallieniellidae. It is endemic to South Africa.

== Distribution ==
Drassodella trilineata is endemic to the Eastern Cape province and is known only from Keurkloof, Farm Ferndale, Baviaanskloof, at an elevation of 473 m above sea level.

== Habitat ==
The species was sampled during litter sifting from Afromontane forest.

== Description ==
Only the female is known. The species can be recognized by a narrow white median carapace stripe and a pair of narrow white dorsolateral abdominal stripes.

== Conservation ==
Drassodella trilineata is listed as Data Deficient. Additional sampling is needed to determine the species' range.
