= Drassodella septemmaculata =

Cape's Northern Long-Jawed Ground Spider

Conservation status
- Least Concern (SANBI Red List)

Scientific classification
- Kingdom: Animalia
- Phylum: Arthropoda
- Subphylum: Chelicerata
- Class: Arachnida
- Order: Araneae
- Infraorder: Araneomorphae
- Family: Gallieniellidae
- Genus: Drassodella
- Species: D. septemmaculata

Binomial name
- Drassodella septemmaculata (Strand, 1909)

Synonyms
- Prosthesima 7-maculata Strand, 1909; Drassodella 7-maculata (Strand, 1909)

Species of spider

Drassodella septemmaculata is a species of spider in the family Gallieniellidae. It is endemic to South Africa.

== Distribution ==
Drassodella septemmaculata is known from two provinces at elevations ranging from 9–1,758 m above sea level. It has been recorded from numerous locations in the Western Cape, including Cape Town areas, Table Mountain National Park, Cederberg Wilderness Area, and various coastal and mountain locations, as well as Oorlogskloof Nature Reserve in the Northern Cape.

== Habitat ==
The species has been sampled in high numbers with pitfall traps in the Cederberg Wilderness Area and occurs in Fynbos and Succulent Karoo biomes.

== Description ==
Both sexes are known. Males have thicker dorsal lines than females.

== Conservation ==
Drassodella septemmaculata is listed as Least Concern due to its wide range. The species is protected in Table Mountain National Park, Oorlogskloof Nature Reserve, and Cederberg Wilderness Area.
