= Drassodella salisburyi =

Salisbury’s Long-Jawed Ground Spider

Conservation status
- Least Concern (SANBI Red List)

Scientific classification
- Kingdom: Animalia
- Phylum: Arthropoda
- Subphylum: Chelicerata
- Class: Arachnida
- Order: Araneae
- Infraorder: Araneomorphae
- Family: Gallieniellidae
- Genus: Drassodella
- Species: D. salisburyi

Binomial name
- Drassodella salisburyi Hewitt, 1916

Synonyms
- Drassodella salisburii Hewitt, 1916

Species of spider

Drassodella salisburyi is a species of spider in the family Gallieniellidae. It is the type species of the genus Drassodella and is endemic to South Africa.

== Distribution ==
Drassodella salisburyi is endemic to the Eastern Cape province at elevations ranging from 222–1488 m above sea level. Known localities include Asante Sana Game Reserve, Grahamstown (type locality), Kentani, Van Stadens Pass, and Great Fish River Reserve.

== Habitat ==
The species was sampled in some localities with pitfall traps and is recorded from Thicket, Indian Ocean Coastal Belt, and Fynbos biomes.

== Description ==
Both sexes are known. They can be recognized by the broad pale median band on the opisthosoma dorsally.

== Conservation ==
Drassodella salisburyi is listed as Least Concern as it has a wide enough distribution range. The species is protected in Asante Sana Private Game Reserve and Great Fish River Reserve. Threats to the species are not considered significant.
