= Drassodella melana =

Dark Long-Jawed Ground Spider

Conservation status
- Least Concern (SANBI Red List)

Scientific classification
- Kingdom: Animalia
- Phylum: Arthropoda
- Subphylum: Chelicerata
- Class: Arachnida
- Order: Araneae
- Infraorder: Araneomorphae
- Family: Gallieniellidae
- Genus: Drassodella
- Species: D. melana

Binomial name
- Drassodella melana Tucker, 1923

Species of spider

Drassodella melana is a species of spider in the family Gallieniellidae. It is endemic to South Africa.

== Distribution ==
Drassodella melana is known from three provinces in South Africa at elevations ranging from 294–1498 m above sea level. It has been recorded from multiple locations in KwaZulu-Natal, Limpopo, and Mpumalanga, including several protected areas.

== Habitat ==
The species are mainly sampled in pitfall traps from Forest and Savanna biomes. In Ngome State Forest, the species was abundant and mainly found in grasslands, but also in indigenous forests and pine plantations.

== Description ==
Both sexes are known. The opisthosoma is uniformly dark brown.

== Conservation ==
Drassodella melana is listed as Least Concern due to its wide range and lack of significant threats. The species is protected in Ngome State Forest, Ithala Game Reserve, Krantzkloof Nature Reserve, and Lekgalameetse Nature Reserve. While threatened in parts of its range by silvicultural and agricultural activities, the overall population is not significantly impacted.
