= Drassodella vasivulva =

Cape's Southern Long-Jawed Ground Spider

Conservation status
- Least Concern (SANBI Red List)

Scientific classification
- Kingdom: Animalia
- Phylum: Arthropoda
- Subphylum: Chelicerata
- Class: Arachnida
- Order: Araneae
- Infraorder: Araneomorphae
- Family: Gallieniellidae
- Genus: Drassodella
- Species: D. vasivulva

Binomial name
- Drassodella vasivulva Tucker, 1923

Species of spider

Drassodella vasivulva is a species of spider in the family Gallieniellidae. It is endemic to South Africa.

== Distribution ==
Drassodella vasivulva is endemic to the Western Cape province at elevations ranging from 2–414 m above sea level. Known localities include Cape Town areas, De Hoop Nature Reserve, Kogelberg Biosphere Reserve, and Moordkuil Valley.

== Habitat ==
The species was sampled from leaf litter in Forest and Fynbos biomes.

== Description ==
Both sexes are known. The thickness of the dorsal lines is more or less the same in both sexes.

== Conservation ==
Drassodella vasivulva is listed as Least Concern. The species has a broad distribution in the southern parts of the Western Cape and may be locally abundant. It is also likely under-collected. The species is protected in De Hoop Nature Reserve and Kogelberg Biosphere Reserve.
