= Austrachelas reavelli =

Reavell’s Long-Jawed Ground Spider

Scientific classification
- Kingdom: Animalia
- Phylum: Arthropoda
- Subphylum: Chelicerata
- Class: Arachnida
- Order: Araneae
- Infraorder: Araneomorphae
- Family: Gallieniellidae
- Genus: Austrachelas
- Species: A. reavelli

Binomial name
- Austrachelas reavelli Haddad, Lyle, Bosselaers & Ramírez, 2009

Species of spider

Austrachelas reavelli is a species of spider in the family Gallieniellidae. It is endemic to South Africa.

== Distribution ==
Austrachelas reavelli is endemic to KwaZulu-Natal province, known from the northern parts at elevations ranging from 340–634 m above sea level. It has been recorded from Hluhluwe-uMfolozi Game Park and Ngoye Forest (type locality).

== Habitat ==
The species was sampled from Forest and Savanna biomes.

== Description ==
Both sexes are known. The carapace is orange-brown in color, slightly paler along the midline. The opisthosoma displays mottled pale grey chevron markings.

== Conservation ==
Austrachelas reavelli is listed as Data Deficient. The species is known from two subpopulations in protected areas (Ngoye Forest and Hluhluwe-uMfolozi Game Park), but is likely under-collected. Additional sampling is required to determine its range and assess threats outside protected areas.
