= Austrachelas natalensis =

Natal Long-Jawed Ground Spider

Conservation status
- Least Concern (SANBI Red List)

Scientific classification
- Kingdom: Animalia
- Phylum: Arthropoda
- Subphylum: Chelicerata
- Class: Arachnida
- Order: Araneae
- Infraorder: Araneomorphae
- Family: Gallieniellidae
- Genus: Austrachelas
- Species: A. natalensis

Binomial name
- Austrachelas natalensis Lawrence, 1942

Species of spider

Austrachelas natalensis is a species of spider in the family Gallieniellidae. It is endemic to South Africa.

== Distribution ==
Austrachelas natalensis is endemic to KwaZulu-Natal province, occurring in both the midlands and coastal regions at elevations ranging from 80–2892 m above sea level. Known localities include Durban, Estcourt, La Mercy, Pietermaritzburg, Sani Pass, Shongweni Dam and Game Reserve, and Umgeni Valley Nature Reserve.

== Habitat ==
The species is sampled with pitfall traps and litter sifting from Grassland, Indian Ocean Coastal Belt, and Savanna biomes. It is adaptable to habitat alterations and can survive in agroecosystems.

== Description ==
Both sexes are known. The opisthosoma displays cream chevron markings.

== Conservation ==
Austrachelas natalensis is listed as Least Concern. Despite having a restricted distribution, the species can survive habitat alteration and occurs in agroecosystems. It is protected in Shongweni Dam and Game Reserve and Umgeni Valley Nature Reserve.
