= Austrachelas merwei =

Van der Merwe’s Long-Jawed Ground Spider

Scientific classification
- Kingdom: Animalia
- Phylum: Arthropoda
- Subphylum: Chelicerata
- Class: Arachnida
- Order: Araneae
- Infraorder: Araneomorphae
- Family: Gallieniellidae
- Genus: Austrachelas
- Species: A. merwei

Binomial name
- Austrachelas merwei Haddad, Lyle, Bosselaers & Ramírez, 2009

Species of spider

Austrachelas merwei is a species of spider in the family Gallieniellidae. It is endemic to South Africa.

== Distribution ==
Austrachelas merwei is endemic to KwaZulu-Natal province and is known only from Ngome State Forest at an elevation of 1,000 m above sea level.

== Habitat ==
During surveys in Ngome State Forest, 37 specimens were collected in pitfall traps in dense forest areas.

== Description ==
Both sexes are known. The opisthosoma displays mottled grey chevron markings and lacks a ventral scutum.

== Conservation ==
Austrachelas merwei is listed as Data Deficient. While protected in Ngome State Forest, the species appears to have a restricted distribution and additional sampling is needed to determine its range.
