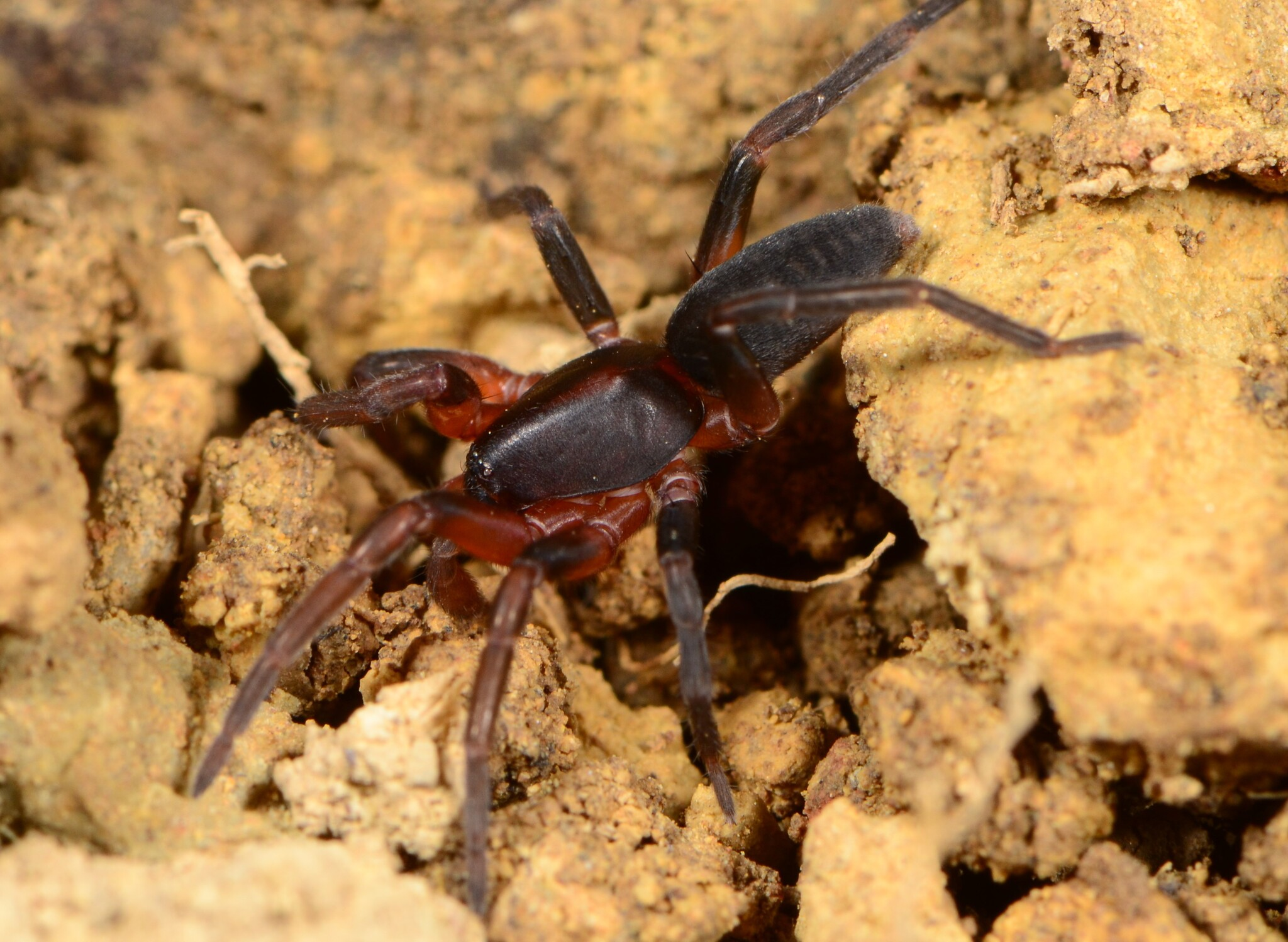
- Male

Scientific classification
- Kingdom: Animalia
- Phylum: Arthropoda
- Subphylum: Chelicerata
- Class: Arachnida
- Order: Araneae
- Infraorder: Araneomorphae
- Family: Gallieniellidae
- Genus: Austrachelas
- Species: A. incertus

Binomial name
- Austrachelas incertus Lawrence, 1938

= Austrachelas incertus =

Eastern Long-Jawed Ground Spider

Species of spider

Austrachelas incertus is a species of spider in the family Gallieniellidae. It is the type species of the genus Austrachelas and is endemic to South Africa.

== Distribution ==
Austrachelas incertus is endemic to KwaZulu-Natal province, with records from elevations ranging from 870–2477 m above sea level. Known localities include Bulwer, Cathedral Peak, Cathkin Peak, Hilton, Karkloof, Ndumeni Forest, Ngome State Forest, Richards Bay, Pietermaritzburg, and Wakefield Farm.

== Habitat ==
The species is typically collected in pitfall traps or through litter sifting in Grassland and Savanna biomes.

== Description ==
Both sexes are known. The opisthosoma displays cream chevron markings.

== Conservation ==
Austrachelas incertus is listed as Vulnerable due to its small restricted distribution range and ongoing decline in habitat outside protected areas. The species faces threats from infrastructure development around Pietermaritzburg and crop farming around Hilton and Karkloof.
