= Drassodella transversa =

Scientific classification
- Kingdom: Animalia
- Phylum: Arthropoda
- Subphylum: Chelicerata
- Class: Arachnida
- Order: Araneae
- Infraorder: Araneomorphae
- Family: Gallieniellidae
- Genus: Drassodella
- Species: D. transversa

Binomial name
- Drassodella transversa Mbo & Haddad, 2019

Species of spider

Drassodella transversa is a species of spider in the family Gallieniellidae. It is endemic to South Africa, known primarily from Mpumalanga and Limpopo provinces. The species is listed as Rare due to its small, restricted distribution range.

== Taxonomy ==
Drassodella transversa was first described by Zingisile Mbo and Charles R. Haddad in 2019, in a revision of the genus Drassodella.

== Distribution ==
Drassodella transversa is primarily known from Mpumalanga province, with additional records from Limpopo province, at elevations ranging from 396–1942 m above sea level. Known localities include Blyde River Canyon, Dullstroom, and Mariepskop State Forest.

== Habitat ==
The species was sampled with pitfall traps and litter sifting from Forest and Savanna biomes.

== Description ==
Both sexes are known. Female opisthosomas are black with six white feathery spots, while males have two pairs of white spots with the posterior pair linked by a white band.

== Conservation ==
Drassodella transversa is listed as Rare due to its small restricted distribution range. Additional sampling is needed to determine the species' range.
