= Drassodella maculata =

Sneeuberg Long-Jawed Ground Spider

Scientific classification
- Kingdom: Animalia
- Phylum: Arthropoda
- Subphylum: Chelicerata
- Class: Arachnida
- Order: Araneae
- Infraorder: Araneomorphae
- Family: Gallieniellidae
- Genus: Drassodella
- Species: D. maculata

Binomial name
- Drassodella maculata Mbo & Haddad, 2019

Species of spider

Drassodella maculata is a species of spider in the family Gallieniellidae. It is endemic to South Africa.

== Distribution ==
Drassodella maculata is endemic to the Eastern Cape province and is known from Asante Sana Game Reserve, between Waterkloof and Zuurkloof, at an elevation of 1458 m above sea level.

== Habitat ==
The species was sampled with pitfall traps during a study of epigaeic invertebrates at Asante Sana Private Game Reserve in the Sneeuberg Mountain Complex.

== Description ==
Only the female is known. The female bears white spots on the opisthosoma dorsally.

== Conservation ==
Drassodella maculata is listed as Data Deficient due to taxonomic reasons. The species is protected in Asante Sana Private Game Reserve, but additional sampling is needed to collect males and determine its range.
