= Drassodella montana =

Sani Pass Long-Jawed Ground Spider

Scientific classification
- Kingdom: Animalia
- Phylum: Arthropoda
- Subphylum: Chelicerata
- Class: Arachnida
- Order: Araneae
- Infraorder: Araneomorphae
- Family: Gallieniellidae
- Genus: Drassodella
- Species: D. montana

Binomial name
- Drassodella montana Mbo & Haddad, 2019

Species of spider

Drassodella montana is a species of spider in the family Gallieniellidae. It is endemic to South Africa.

== Distribution ==
Drassodella montana is endemic to KwaZulu-Natal province and has been sampled from different elevations on the Sani Pass at an elevation of 1169 m above sea level. Known locations include Glen Bain and Ixopo.

== Habitat ==
The species was sampled with pitfall traps during an elevational project between 900 and 1200 m above sea level.

== Description ==
Both sexes are known. The opisthosoma is black with a white speckle above the spinnerets.

== Conservation ==
Drassodella montana is listed as Data Deficient. Additional sampling is needed to collect males and determine the species' range.
