= Austrachelas sexoculatus =

Six-eyed Long-Jawed Ground Spider

Scientific classification
- Kingdom: Animalia
- Phylum: Arthropoda
- Subphylum: Chelicerata
- Class: Arachnida
- Order: Araneae
- Infraorder: Araneomorphae
- Family: Gallieniellidae
- Genus: Austrachelas
- Species: A. sexoculatus

Binomial name
- Austrachelas sexoculatus Haddad, Lyle, Bosselaers & Ramírez, 2009

Species of spider

Austrachelas sexoculatus is a species of spider in the family Gallieniellidae. It is endemic to South Africa.

== Etymology ==
The species name sexoculatus derives from Latin, meaning "six-eyed", referring to the spider's unusual eye arrangement.

== Distribution ==
Austrachelas sexoculatus is endemic to the Eastern Cape province and is known only from East London at an elevation of 68 m above sea level.

== Habitat ==
The species was sampled from the Indian Ocean Coastal Belt Biome.

== Description ==
Only the male is known. The carapace is deep-red, and the opisthosoma is dark grey on the dorsal side and cream on the lateral and ventral sides.

== Conservation ==
Austrachelas sexoculatus is listed as Data Deficient due to taxonomic reasons. The species is known only from an old collection from 1916 in an area highly transformed for human settlement. The species is likely threatened by habitat loss for infrastructure development in East London. Additional sampling is needed to collect females and determine current status.
