= Drassodella baviaans =

Spotted Long-Jawed Ground Spider

Scientific classification
- Kingdom: Animalia
- Phylum: Arthropoda
- Subphylum: Chelicerata
- Class: Arachnida
- Order: Araneae
- Infraorder: Araneomorphae
- Family: Gallieniellidae
- Genus: Drassodella
- Species: D. baviaans

Binomial name
- Drassodella baviaans Mbo & Haddad, 2019

Species of spider

Drassodella baviaans is a species of spider in the family Gallieniellidae. It is endemic to South Africa.

== Distribution ==
Drassodella baviaans is endemic to the Eastern Cape province and is known only from Baviaanskloof, specifically from Keurkloof, Farm Ferndale, at an elevation of 473 m above sea level.

== Habitat ==
The species was sampled with pitfall traps and litter sifting from the Baviaanskloof.

== Description ==
Only the male is known. The species is recognized by the spots on the dorsal side of the opisthosoma.

== Conservation ==
Drassodella baviaans is listed as Data Deficient due to taxonomic reasons. Additional sampling is needed to collect females and determine the species' range.
