= Drassodella tolkieni =

Tolkien’s Long-Jawed Ground Spider

Scientific classification
- Kingdom: Animalia
- Phylum: Arthropoda
- Subphylum: Chelicerata
- Class: Arachnida
- Order: Araneae
- Infraorder: Araneomorphae
- Family: Gallieniellidae
- Genus: Drassodella
- Species: D. tolkieni

Binomial name
- Drassodella tolkieni Mbo & Haddad, 2019

Species of spider

Drassodella tolkieni is a species of spider in the family Gallieniellidae. It is endemic to South Africa.

== Distribution ==
Drassodella tolkieni is endemic to the Eastern Cape province and is known only from Hogsback, Amatola Forestry Company, at elevations ranging from 1203 to 1220 m above sea level.

== Habitat ==
The species was sampled with pitfall traps in Fynbos biome.

== Description ==
Both sexes are known. The opisthosoma is dark brown with four white dorsal posterolateral markings.

== Conservation ==
Drassodella tolkieni is listed as Data Deficient. Additional sampling is needed to determine the species' range.
