= Meedo (spider) =

Scientific classification
- Domain: Eukaryota
- Kingdom: Animalia
- Phylum: Arthropoda
- Subphylum: Chelicerata
- Class: Arachnida
- Order: Araneae
- Infraorder: Araneomorphae
- Family: Trachycosmidae
- Genus: Meedo; Main, 1987

Type species
- M. houstoni Main, 1987

Species
- 13, see text

Genus of spiders

Meedo is a genus of Australian araneomorph spiders in the family Trachycosmidae, and was first described by Barbara York Main in 1987.

== Species ==
As of May 2019 it contains thirteen species:

- Meedo bluff Platnick, 2002 – Australia (New South Wales)
- Meedo booti Platnick, 2002 – Australia (New South Wales)
- Meedo broadwater Platnick, 2002 – Australia (Queensland)
- Meedo cohuna Platnick, 2002 – eastern Australia
- Meedo flinders Platnick, 2002 – Australia (South Australia)
- Meedo gympie Platnick, 2002 – Australia (Queensland, New South Wales)
- Meedo harveyi Platnick, 2002 – Australia (Western Australia)
- Meedo houstoni Main, 1987 (type) – Australia (Western Australia)
- Meedo mullaroo Platnick, 2002 – Australia (South Australia, Queensland to Victoria)
- Meedo munmorah Platnick, 2002 – Australia (New South Wales)
- Meedo ovtsharenkoi Platnick, 2002 – Australia (Western Australia)
- Meedo yarragin Platnick, 2002 – Australia (Western Australia)
- Meedo yeni Platnick, 2002 – Australia (Western Australia, South Australia, Victoria)
