= Tinytrema =

Scientific classification
- Kingdom: Animalia
- Phylum: Arthropoda
- Subphylum: Chelicerata
- Class: Arachnida
- Order: Araneae
- Infraorder: Araneomorphae
- Family: Trachycosmidae
- Genus: Tinytrema; Platnick

Type species
- Tinytrema bondi Platnick, 2002

Species
- Tinytrema bondi Platnick, 2002; Tinytrema kangaroo Platnick, 2002; Tinytrema sandy Platnick, 2002; Tinytrema wombat Platnick, 2002; Tinytrema yarra Platnick, 2002

Genus of spiders

Tinytrema is a genus of spiders in the family Trachycosmidae. It was first described in 2002 by Platnick. As of 2017, it contains 5 Australian species. Commonly found in Australia, they are described as extremely small and flat with white spots on the abdomen.
