= Pyrnus =

Scientific classification
- Kingdom: Animalia
- Phylum: Arthropoda
- Subphylum: Chelicerata
- Class: Arachnida
- Order: Araneae
- Infraorder: Araneomorphae
- Family: Trachycosmidae
- Genus: Pyrnus; Simon

Type species
- Pyrnus fulvus (L. Koch, 1875)

Species
- 9, see text

Genus of spiders

Pyrnus is a genus of spiders in the family Trachycosmidae. It was first described in 1880 by Simon. As of 2017, it contains 9 species.

== Species ==
Pyrnus comprises the following species:

- Pyrnus aoupinie Platnick, 2002 - New Caledonia
- Pyrnus baehri Platnick, 2002 - North Australia
- Pyrnus fulvus (L. Koch, 1875) - South Australia
- Pyrnus insularis Platnick, 2002 - Lord Howe Island
- Pyrnus magnet Platnick, 2002 - Australia
- Pyrnus numeus Platnick, 2002 - New Caledonia
- Pyrnus obscurus (Berland, 1924) - New Caledonia
- Pyrnus pins Platnick, 2002 - New Caledonia
- Pyrnus planus (L. Koch, 1875) - Australia
