= Hemicloeina =

Scientific classification
- Kingdom: Animalia
- Phylum: Arthropoda
- Subphylum: Chelicerata
- Class: Arachnida
- Order: Araneae
- Infraorder: Araneomorphae
- Family: Trachycosmidae
- Genus: Hemicloeina; Simon

Type species
- Hemicloeina somersetensis (Thorell, 1881)

Species
- 9, see text

Genus of spiders

Hemicloeina is a genus of spiders in the family Trachycosmidae. It was first described in 1893 by Simon. As of 2017, it contains 9 species found in Australia and only Hemicloeina bulolo found in New Guinea.

== Species ==
Hemicloeina comprises the following species:

- Hemicloeina bluff Platnick, 2002
- Hemicloeina bulolo Platnick, 2002
- Hemicloeina gayndah Platnick, 2002
- Hemicloeina humptydoo Platnick, 2002
- Hemicloeina julatten Platnick, 2002
- Hemicloeina kapalga Platnick, 2002
- Hemicloeina somersetensis (Thorell, 1881)
- Hemicloeina spec Platnick, 2002
- Hemicloeina wyndham Platnick, 2002
