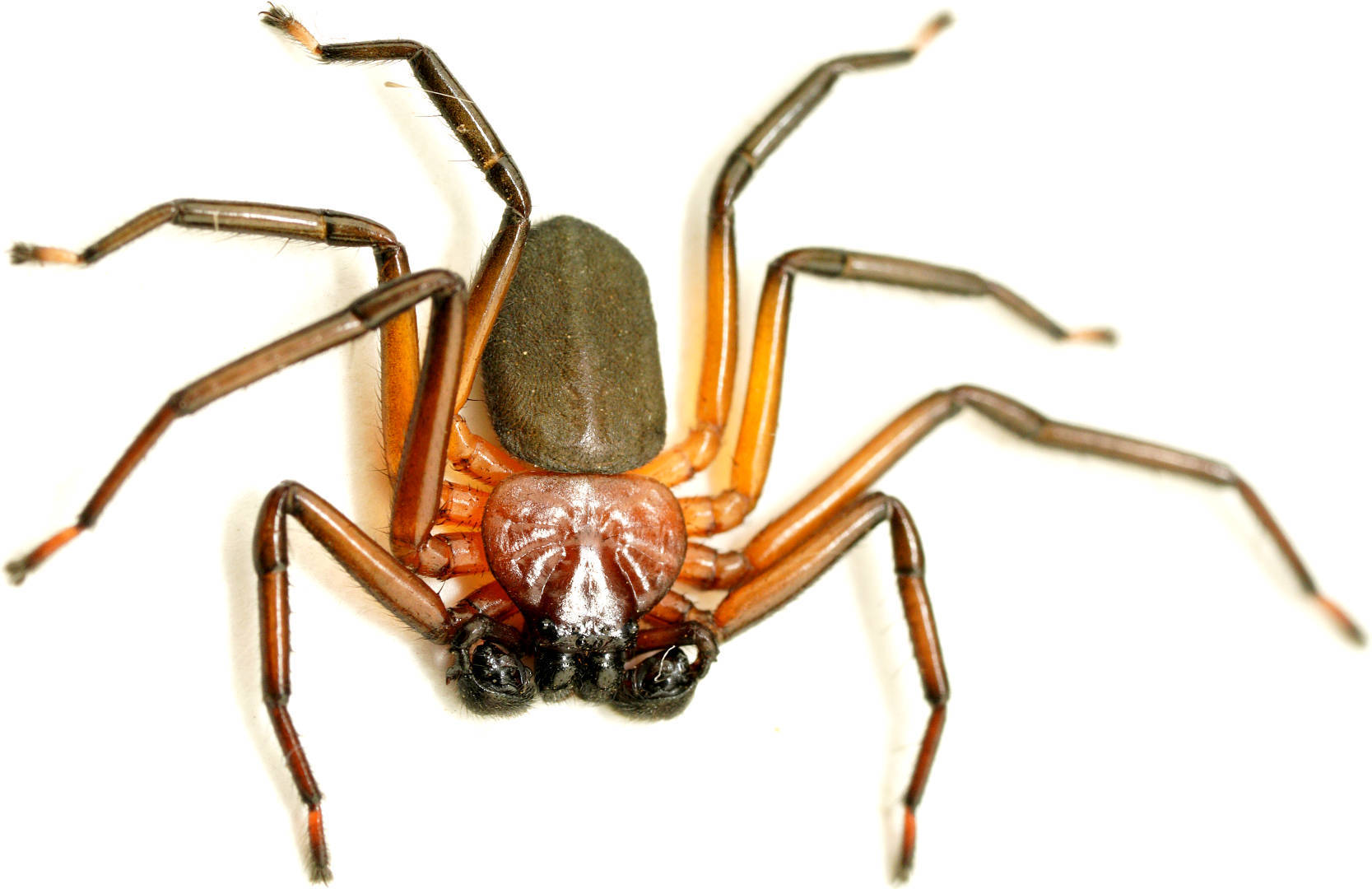
- Platorish gelorup https://www.ellura.info/Arachnida.html#Platorish-gelorup

Scientific classification
- Kingdom: Animalia
- Phylum: Arthropoda
- Subphylum: Chelicerata
- Class: Arachnida
- Order: Araneae
- Infraorder: Araneomorphae
- Family: Trachycosmidae
- Genus: Platorish; Platnick

Type species
- Platorish flavitarsis

Species
- Platorish churchillae Platnick, 2002; Platorish flavitarsis (L. Koch, 1875); Platorish gelorup Platnick, 2002; Platorish jimna Platnick, 2002; Platorish nebo Platnick, 2002

= Platorish =

Genus of spiders

Platorish is a genus of spiders in the family Trachycosmidae. It was first described in 2002 by Platnick. As of 2017, it contains 5 Australian species.
