= Oreo (spider) =

Scientific classification
- Kingdom: Animalia
- Phylum: Arthropoda
- Subphylum: Chelicerata
- Class: Arachnida
- Order: Araneae
- Infraorder: Araneomorphae
- Family: Trachycosmidae
- Genus: Oreo; Platnick, 2002

Type species
- O. renmark Platnick, 2002

Species
- 5, see text

Genus of spiders

Oreo is a genus of Australian araneomorph spiders in the family Trachycosmidae, and was first described by Norman I. Platnick in 2002. The name derives from the Oreo cookie. The type species has a black and white abdomen, although such coloration is common among gallieniellids.

== Species ==
As of May 2019 it contains five species:

- Oreo bushbay Platnick, 2002 – Australia (Western Australia)
- Oreo capensis Platnick, 2002 – Australia (Western Australia)
- Oreo kidman Platnick, 2002 – Australia (Northern Territory)
- Oreo muncoonie Platnick, 2002 – Australia (Queensland)
- Oreo renmark Platnick, 2002 (type) – Australia (South Australia, Queensland to Victoria)
