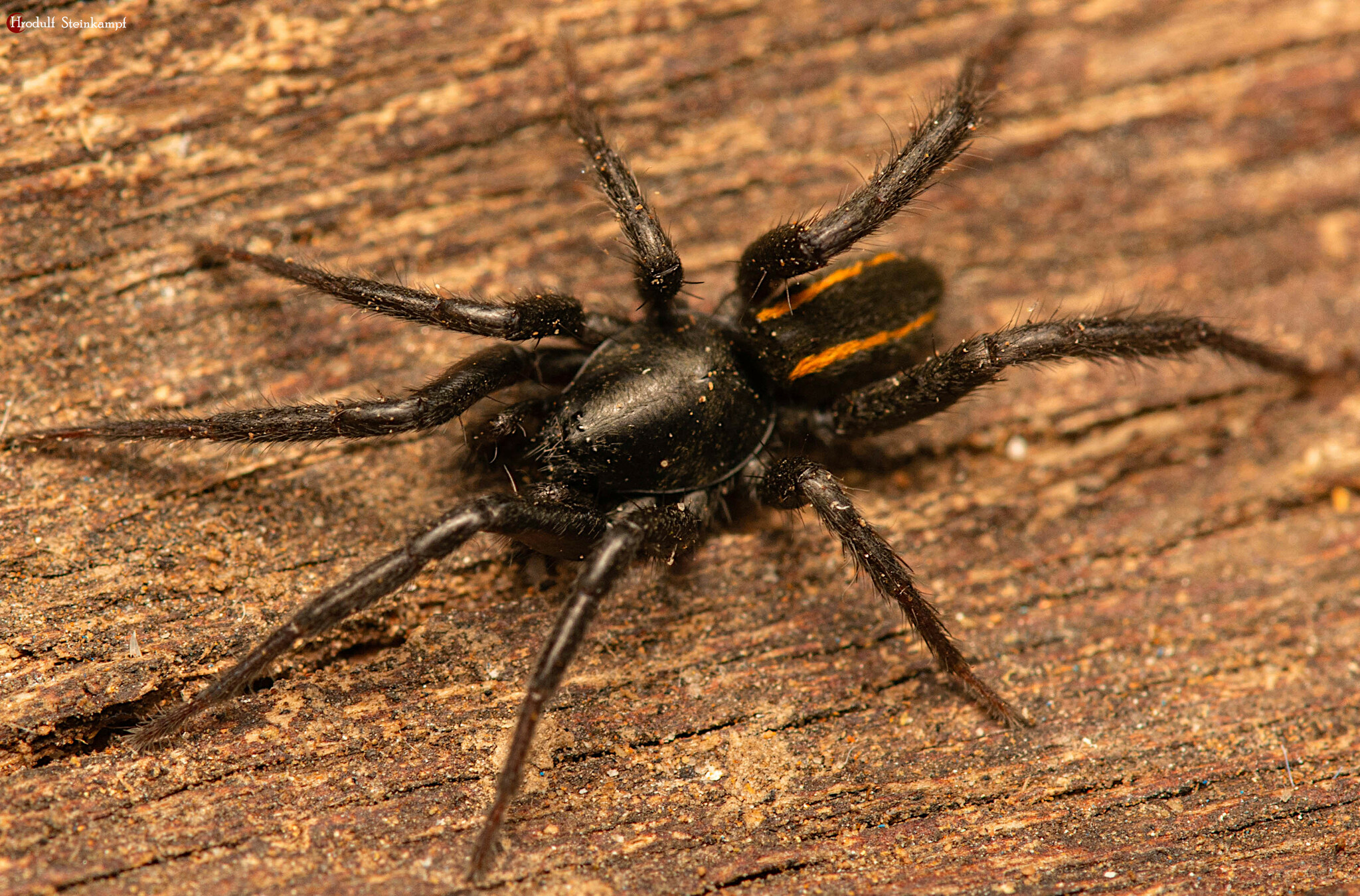

Scientific classification
- Kingdom: Animalia
- Phylum: Arthropoda
- Subphylum: Chelicerata
- Class: Arachnida
- Order: Araneae
- Infraorder: Araneomorphae
- Family: Gallieniellidae
- Genus: Drassodella
- Species: D. aurostriata

Binomial name
- Drassodella aurostriata Mbo & Haddad, 2019

= Drassodella aurostriata =

Species of spider

Drassodella aurostriata is a species of spider in the family Gallieniellidae. It is endemic to South Africa.

== Etymology ==
The species name is derived from the Latin words aurum (gold) and striatus (striped), referring to the two golden-orange longitudinal lateral stripes on its abdomen.

== Distribution ==
Drassodella aurostriata is endemic to the Western Cape province, known from several localities around Knysna at elevations ranging from 26 to 232 m above sea level. Recorded locations include Tsitsikamma National Park, Groeneweide Forest Station, Goukamma Nature Reserve, Gouna and Diepwalle State Forest, and Knysna Uitzicht Annex.

== Habitat ==
The species was sampled with pitfall traps and litter sifting from dry, humid forest and Coastal Forest environments.

== Description ==
Both sexes are known. The species is easily recognized by pair of golden-orange lateral stripes on dorsal surface of the abdomen (the opisthosoma), separated by a broad black median stripe.

== Conservation ==
Drassodella aurostriata is listed as Rare due to its small restricted distribution range, but more sampling is needed to determine its range. The species is protected in Tsitsikamma National Park and Goukamma Nature Reserve.
