= Trachycosmus =

Scientific classification
- Kingdom: Animalia
- Phylum: Arthropoda
- Subphylum: Chelicerata
- Class: Arachnida
- Order: Araneae
- Infraorder: Araneomorphae
- Family: Trachycosmidae
- Genus: Trachycosmus; Simon

Type species
- Trachycosmus sculptilis Simon, 1893

Species
- Trachycosmus allyn Platnick, 2002; Trachycosmus cockatoo Platnick, 2002; Trachycosmus sculptilis Simon, 1893; Trachycosmus turramurra Platnick, 2002

Genus of spiders

Trachycosmus is a genus of spiders in the family Trachycosmidae. It was first described in 1893 by Simon. As of 2017, it contains 4 Australian species.

Habitat: This species is widely distributed in Australia, spider usually found wandering on open ground or in leaf litter.

Toxicity: Uncertain, may be aggressive when defending its egg sac.
