= Austrachelas entabeni =

Entabeni Long-Jawed Ground Spider

Scientific classification
- Kingdom: Animalia
- Phylum: Arthropoda
- Subphylum: Chelicerata
- Class: Arachnida
- Order: Araneae
- Infraorder: Araneomorphae
- Family: Gallieniellidae
- Genus: Austrachelas
- Species: A. entabeni

Binomial name
- Austrachelas entabeni Haddad & Mbo, 2017

Species of spider

Austrachelas entabeni is a species of spider in the family Gallieniellidae. It is endemic to South Africa.

== Distribution ==
Austrachelas entabeni is known only from its type locality in Limpopo province: Entabeni Forest in the Soutpansberg Mountains, approximately 20 km north of Levubu, at an elevation of 1360 m above sea level.

== Habitat ==
The species inhabits Forest Biome environments and was sampled through litter sifting.

== Description ==
Only the female is known. The abdomen displays creamy-grey chevron markings dorsally and V-shaped mediolateral markings ventrally.

== Conservation ==
Austrachelas entabeni is listed as Data Deficient due to taxonomic reasons, being known only from the female. Additional sampling is needed to collect males and determine the species' range.
