= Desognaphosa =

Scientific classification
- Kingdom: Animalia
- Phylum: Arthropoda
- Subphylum: Chelicerata
- Class: Arachnida
- Order: Araneae
- Infraorder: Araneomorphae
- Family: Trachycosmidae
- Genus: Desognaphosa; Platnick

Type species
- Desognaphosa yabbra

Species
- 26, see text

Genus of spiders

Desognaphosa is a genus of spiders in the family Trachycosmidae. It was first described in 2002 by Platnick. As of 2017, it contains 26 species, most found in Queensland. D. solomani is found in the Solomon Islands; D. yabbra is found in Queensland and New South Wales.

== Species ==
Desognaphosa comprises the following 26 species:

- Desognaphosa bartle Platnick, 2002
- Desognaphosa bellenden Platnick, 2002
- Desognaphosa boolbun Platnick, 2002
- Desognaphosa bulburin Platnick, 2002
- Desognaphosa carbine Platnick, 2002
- Desognaphosa dryander Platnick, 2002
- Desognaphosa eungella Platnick, 2002
- Desognaphosa finnigan Platnick, 2002
- Desognaphosa funnel Platnick, 2002
- Desognaphosa goonaneman Platnick, 2002
- Desognaphosa halcyon Platnick, 2002
- Desognaphosa homerule Platnick, 2002
- Desognaphosa karnak Platnick, 2002
- Desognaphosa kirrama Platnick, 2002
- Desognaphosa kroombit Platnick, 2002
- Desognaphosa kuranda Platnick, 2002
- Desognaphosa malbon Platnick, 2002
- Desognaphosa massey Platnick, 2002
- Desognaphosa millaa Platnick, 2002
- Desognaphosa pershouse Platnick, 2002
- Desognaphosa solomoni Platnick, 2002
- Desognaphosa spurgeon Platnick, 2002
- Desognaphosa tribulation Platnick, 2002
- Desognaphosa tyson Platnick, 2002
- Desognaphosa windsor Platnick, 2002
- Desognaphosa yabbra Platnick, 2002
