= Drassodella purcelli =

Purcell’s Long-Jawed Ground Spider

Scientific classification
- Kingdom: Animalia
- Phylum: Arthropoda
- Subphylum: Chelicerata
- Class: Arachnida
- Order: Araneae
- Infraorder: Araneomorphae
- Family: Gallieniellidae
- Genus: Drassodella
- Species: D. purcelli

Binomial name
- Drassodella purcelli Tucker, 1923

Species of spider

Drassodella purcelli is a species of spider in the family Gallieniellidae. It is endemic to South Africa. Also known as the Purcell's Long-Jawed Ground Spider, it was first described by Tucker in 1923. This species is one of many in the Drassodella genus, which was originally classified with the ground spiders but was later moved to the Gallieniellidae family.

== Distribution ==
Drassodella purcelli is endemic to the Western Cape province at elevations ranging from 662–969 m above sea level. Known localities include Anysberg Nature Reserve, Matjiesfontein (type locality), and Touws River station.

== Habitat ==
The species was sampled with pitfall traps and litter sifting. At Anysberg Nature Reserve, it was found in riparian woodland.

== Description ==
Only the female is known. The opisthosoma is black with two pairs of white spots.

== Conservation ==
Drassodella purcelli is listed as Data Deficient due to taxonomic reasons. The species is protected in Anysberg Nature Reserve, but additional sampling is needed to collect males and determine its range.
