= Drassodella guttata =

Platberg Long-Jawed Ground Spider

Scientific classification
- Kingdom: Animalia
- Phylum: Arthropoda
- Subphylum: Chelicerata
- Class: Arachnida
- Order: Araneae
- Infraorder: Araneomorphae
- Family: Gallieniellidae
- Genus: Drassodella
- Species: D. guttata

Binomial name
- Drassodella guttata Mbo & Haddad, 2019

Species of spider

Drassodella guttata is a species of spider in the family Gallieniellidae. It is endemic to South Africa.

== Distribution ==
Drassodella guttata is endemic to the Free State province and is known only from Platberg Nature Reserve at an elevation of 2188 m above sea level.

== Habitat ==
The species was sampled from under rocks on the mountain side in Alpine Grassland.

== Description ==
Both sexes are known. The opisthosoma is decorated with white spots.

== Conservation ==
Drassodella guttata is listed as Data Deficient. The species is protected in Platberg Nature Reserve, but additional sampling is needed to determine its range.
