= Austrachelas bergi =

Berg’s Long-Jawed Ground Spider

Conservation status
- Least Concern (SANBI Red List)

Scientific classification
- Kingdom: Animalia
- Phylum: Arthropoda
- Subphylum: Chelicerata
- Class: Arachnida
- Order: Araneae
- Infraorder: Araneomorphae
- Family: Gallieniellidae
- Genus: Austrachelas
- Species: A. bergi

Binomial name
- Austrachelas bergi Haddad, Lyle, Bosselaers & Ramírez, 2009

Species of spider

Austrachelas bergi is a species of spider in the family Gallieniellidae. It is endemic to South Africa.

== Distribution ==
Austrachelas bergi is endemic to Mpumalanga province. It has been recorded from several localities at elevations ranging from 398–1436 m above sea level, including Nelspruit district, Graskop, Mariepskop State Forest, and Songimvelo Nature Reserve.

== Habitat ==
The species inhabits grassland and forest areas in the Savanna Biome. Type specimens were collected from avocado orchards, indicating the species can survive in agroecosystems.

== Description ==
The opisthosoma is dark grey with cream spots on the dorsal surface. The prosoma has darker shades of maroon at the edges and lighter shades in the middle. The legs are creamy-peach colored.

== Conservation ==
Austrachelas bergi is listed as Least Concern. The species can survive in agroecosystems and is protected in Songimvelo Nature Reserve and Mariepskop State Forest.
