= Drassodella flava =

Yellow Long-Jawed Ground Spider

Conservation status
- Least Concern (SANBI Red List)

Scientific classification
- Kingdom: Animalia
- Phylum: Arthropoda
- Subphylum: Chelicerata
- Class: Arachnida
- Order: Araneae
- Infraorder: Araneomorphae
- Family: Gallieniellidae
- Genus: Drassodella
- Species: D. flava

Binomial name
- Drassodella flava Mbo & Haddad, 2019

Species of spider

Drassodella flava is a species of spider in the family Gallieniellidae. It is endemic to South Africa.

== Distribution ==
Drassodella flava is known from three provinces at elevations ranging from 1076–1709 m above sea level. It has been recorded from Ngome State Forest in KwaZulu-Natal, Magoebaskloof Trail in Limpopo, and multiple locations in Mpumalanga including Berlin Forest Station, Graskop area, and Sabie.

== Habitat ==
The species was sampled with pitfall traps and litter sifting from forest areas. During surveys at Ngome State Forest, the species was found in open forest, dense forest, pine plantation, and ecotone habitats.

== Description ==
Both sexes are known. The species is recognized by its yellow to orange legs and carapace.

== Conservation ==
Drassodella flava is listed as Least Concern due to its wide range. The species is protected in Ngome State Forest.
