= Austrachelas kalaharinus =

Scientific classification
- Kingdom: Animalia
- Phylum: Arthropoda
- Subphylum: Chelicerata
- Class: Arachnida
- Order: Araneae
- Infraorder: Araneomorphae
- Family: Gallieniellidae
- Genus: Austrachelas
- Species: A. kalaharinus

Binomial name
- Austrachelas kalaharinus Haddad, Lyle, Bosselaers & Ramírez, 2009

Species of spider

Austrachelas kalaharinus is a species of spider in the family Gallieniellidae. It is endemic to South Africa.

== Distribution ==
Austrachelas kalaharinus is known only from its type locality at Benfontein Nature Reserve, which borders the Northern Cape and Free State provinces, at an elevation of 1145 m above sea level.

== Habitat ==
The species was sampled from pitfall traps in the Grassland Biome.

== Description ==
Only the male is known. The abdomen is cream both laterally and ventrally.

== Conservation ==
Austrachelas kalaharinus is listed as Data Deficient due to taxonomic reasons. Only the male is known, making female identification problematic. Additional sampling is needed to collect females and determine the species' range.
