= Drassodella amatola =

Amatola Long-Jawed Ground Spider

Scientific classification
- Kingdom: Animalia
- Phylum: Arthropoda
- Subphylum: Chelicerata
- Class: Arachnida
- Order: Araneae
- Infraorder: Araneomorphae
- Family: Gallieniellidae
- Genus: Drassodella
- Species: D. amatola

Binomial name
- Drassodella amatola Mbo & Haddad, 2019

Species of spider

Drassodella amatola is a species of spider in the family Gallieniellidae. It is endemic to South Africa.

== Distribution ==
Drassodella amatola is endemic to the Eastern Cape province and is known only from Hogsback in the Amatola Mountains at an elevation of 1,013 m above sea level.

== Habitat ==
The species was sampled during litter sifting in Afromontane Forest.

== Description ==
Both sexes are known. The opisthosoma is uniformly black without markings.

== Conservation ==
Drassodella amatola is listed as Data Deficient. The species is known only from a single male and two females, and additional sampling is needed to determine its range.
