= Drassodella tenebrosa =

Pietermaritzburg Long-Jawed Ground Spider

Conservation status
- Endangered (SANBI Red List)

Scientific classification
- Kingdom: Animalia
- Phylum: Arthropoda
- Subphylum: Chelicerata
- Class: Arachnida
- Order: Araneae
- Infraorder: Araneomorphae
- Family: Gallieniellidae
- Genus: Drassodella
- Species: D. tenebrosa

Binomial name
- Drassodella tenebrosa Lawrence, 1938

Species of spider

Drassodella tenebrosa is a species of spider in the family Gallieniellidae. It is endemic to South Africa.

== Distribution ==
Drassodella tenebrosa is endemic to the KwaZulu-Natal province at elevations ranging from 647–1482 m above sea level. Known localities include Karkloof (type locality), Pietermaritzburg, KwaZulu-Natal Botanical Gardens, and Town Bush.

== Habitat ==
The species was first sampled from the Savanna Biome.

== Description ==
The species exhibits traits of sexual dimorphism such as females having a grey-yellow opisthosoma while males have a grey abdomen.

== Conservation ==
Drassodella tenebrosa is listed as Endangered due to ongoing loss of habitat to urban expansion, crop cultivation, and plantation forestry. The species is threatened by habitat loss to crop farming, plantation forestry, and urbanization.
