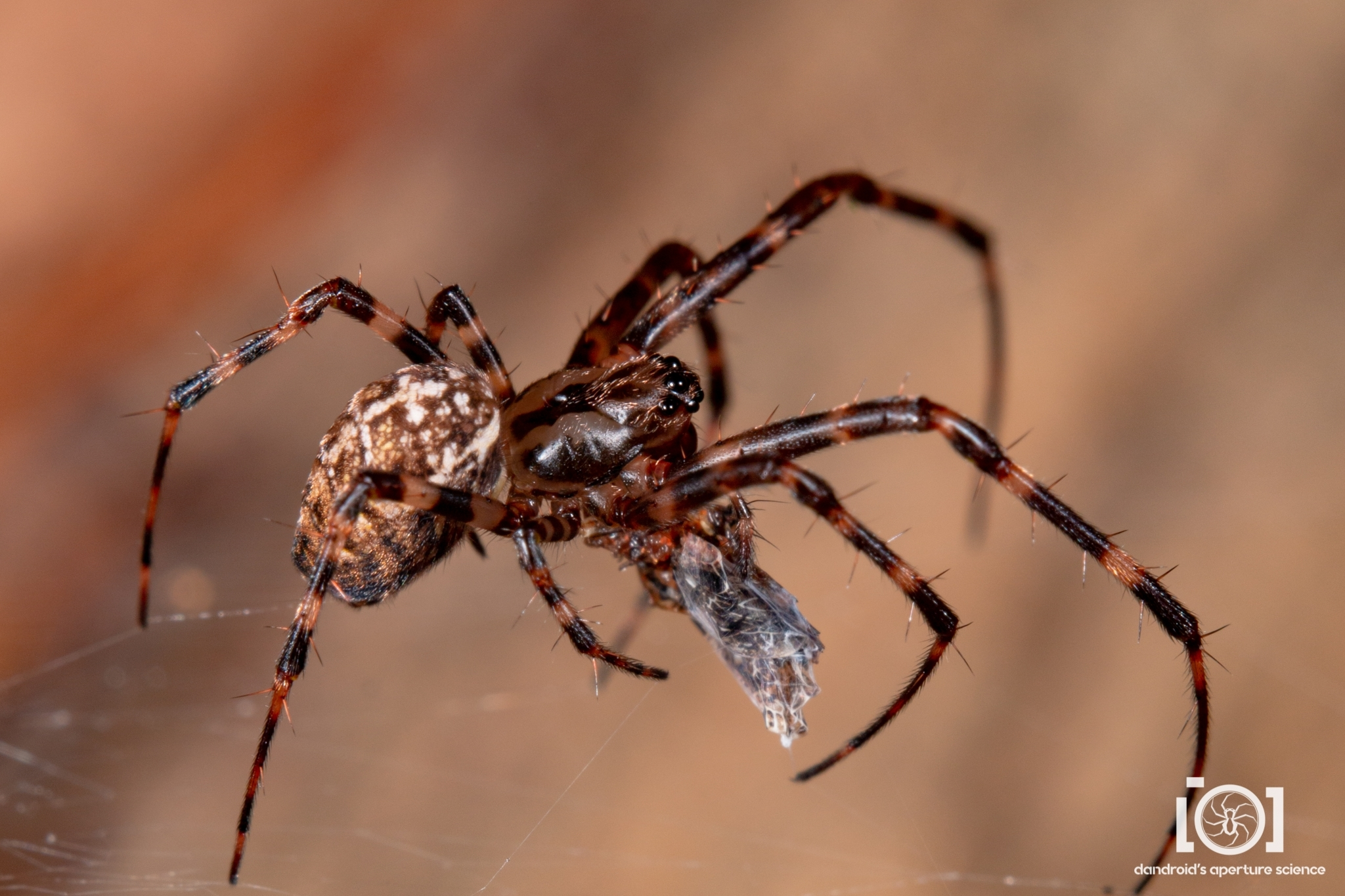
- A. affinis

Scientific classification
- Kingdom: Animalia
- Phylum: Arthropoda
- Subphylum: Chelicerata
- Class: Arachnida
- Order: Araneae
- Infraorder: Araneomorphae
- Family: Tetragnathidae
- Genus: Azilia; Keyserling, 1881

Type species
- A. formosa Keyserling, 1881

Species
- 11, see text

Synonyms
- Arochoides Mello-Leitão, 1940; Cardimia Mello-Leitão, 1940

= Azilia =

Genus of spiders

Azilia is a genus of long-jawed orb-weavers that was first described by Eugen von Keyserling in 1881. It is a senior synonym of Cardimia.

== Species ==
As of March 2021 it contains eleven species, found in Central America, South America, Cuba, on Saint Vincent and the Grenadines, and in the United States:

- Azilia affinis O. Pickard-Cambridge, 1893 – USA to Panama
- Azilia boudeti Simon, 1895 – Brazil
- Azilia eximia (Mello-Leitão, 1940) – Brazil
- Azilia formosa Keyserling, 1881 (type) – Peru
- Azilia guatemalensis O. Pickard-Cambridge, 1889 – Central America to Peru, St. Vincent
- Azilia histrio Simon, 1895 – Brazil
- Azilia integrans (Mello-Leitão, 1935) — Brazil
- Azilia marmorata Mello-Leitão, 1948 – Guyana
- Azilia montana Bryant, 1940 – Cuba
- Azilia rojasi Simon, 1895 – Venezuela
- Azilia vachoni (Caporiacco, 1954) – French Guiana

In synonymy:

- A. mexicana Banks, 1898 = Azilia affinis O. Pickard-Cambridge, 1893
- A. vagepicta Simon, 1895 = Azilia affinis O. Pickard-Cambridge, 1893

Formerly placed here

- Azilia leucostigma Mello-Leitão, 1941– now in Galianoella
