= Azilia affinis =

Scientific classification
- Domain: Eukaryota
- Kingdom: Animalia
- Phylum: Arthropoda
- Subphylum: Chelicerata
- Class: Arachnida
- Order: Araneae
- Infraorder: Araneomorphae
- Family: Tetragnathidae
- Genus: Azilia
- Species: A. affinis

Binomial name
- Azilia affinis O. P.-Cambridge, 1893

Species of spider

Azilia affinis is a species of long-jawed orb weaver in the family of spiders known as Tetragnathidae. It is found in a range from the United States to Panama.
