= Drassodella venda =

Scientific classification
- Kingdom: Animalia
- Phylum: Arthropoda
- Subphylum: Chelicerata
- Class: Arachnida
- Order: Araneae
- Infraorder: Araneomorphae
- Family: Gallieniellidae
- Genus: Drassodella
- Species: D. venda

Binomial name
- Drassodella venda Mbo & Haddad, 2019

Species of spider

Drassodella venda is a species of spider in the family Gallieniellidae. It is endemic to South Africa.

== Distribution ==
Drassodella venda is endemic to Limpopo province at an elevation of 1360 m above sea level. Known localities include Entabeni Nature Reserve, Lekgalameetse Nature Reserve, and Thathe Vondo Forest in the Soutpansberg region.

== Habitat ==
The species was sampled with pitfall traps and litter sifting from Savanna and Forest Biomes.

== Description ==
Both sexes are known. They can be recognized by their dark brown carapace and black opisthosoma without markings.

== Conservation ==
Drassodella venda is listed as Rare due to its small restricted distribution range. The species is protected in Entabeni Nature Reserve, Lekgalameetse Nature Reserve, and Thathe Vondo Forest.
