= Azilia integrans =

Scientific classification
- Kingdom: Animalia
- Phylum: Arthropoda
- Subphylum: Chelicerata
- Class: Arachnida
- Order: Araneae
- Infraorder: Araneomorphae
- Family: Tetragnathidae
- Genus: Azilia
- Species: A. integrans

Binomial name
- Azilia integrans (Mello-Leitão, 1935)

Synonyms
- Arochoides integrans Mello-Leitão, 1935

Species of spider

Azilia integrans is a species of spider in the long-jawed orb weaver family Tetragnathidae, native to Brazil.
