= Austrachelas wassenaari =

Conservation status
- Least Concern (IUCN 3.1)

Scientific classification
- Kingdom: Animalia
- Phylum: Arthropoda
- Subphylum: Chelicerata
- Class: Arachnida
- Order: Araneae
- Infraorder: Araneomorphae
- Family: Gallieniellidae
- Genus: Austrachelas
- Species: A. wassenaari

Binomial name
- Austrachelas wassenaari Haddad, Lyle, Bosselaers & Ramírez, 2009

Species of spider

Austrachelas wassenaari is a species of spider in the family Gallieniellidae. It is endemic to South Africa.

== Distribution ==
Austrachelas wassenaari is endemic to KwaZulu-Natal province, recorded from the northern coastal parts at elevations ranging from 4–56 m above sea level. Known localities include iSimangaliso Wetland Park (Fanie's Island) and Richards Bay.

== Habitat ==
The species has been found in rehabilitated coastal dune forests previously mined near Richards Bay. As a ground dweller, it appears able to survive habitat modification. It occurs within the Indian Ocean Coastal Belt Biome.

== Description ==
Both sexes are known. The opisthosoma displays chevron markings.

== Conservation ==
Austrachelas wassenaari is listed as Rare due to its small restricted distribution range. The species is protected in iSimangaliso Wetland Park, but additional sampling is needed to determine its full range.
