= Drassodella lotzi =

Lotz’s Long-Jawed Ground Spider

Scientific classification
- Kingdom: Animalia
- Phylum: Arthropoda
- Subphylum: Chelicerata
- Class: Arachnida
- Order: Araneae
- Infraorder: Araneomorphae
- Family: Gallieniellidae
- Genus: Drassodella
- Species: D. lotzi

Binomial name
- Drassodella lotzi Mbo & Haddad, 2019

Species of spider

Drassodella lotzi is a species of spider in the family Gallieniellidae. It is endemic to South Africa.

== Distribution ==
Drassodella lotzi is endemic to KwaZulu-Natal province and is known only from Enseleni Game Reserve, Lower Umfolozi, at an elevation of 64 m above sea level.

== Habitat ==
The species was sampled with pitfall traps and litter sifting.

== Description ==
Only the female is known. The opisthosoma is grey-brown in colour with dotted mottling.

== Conservation ==
Drassodella lotzi is listed as Data Deficient due to taxonomic reasons. The species is protected in Enseleni Game Reserve, but additional sampling is needed to collect males and determine its range.
