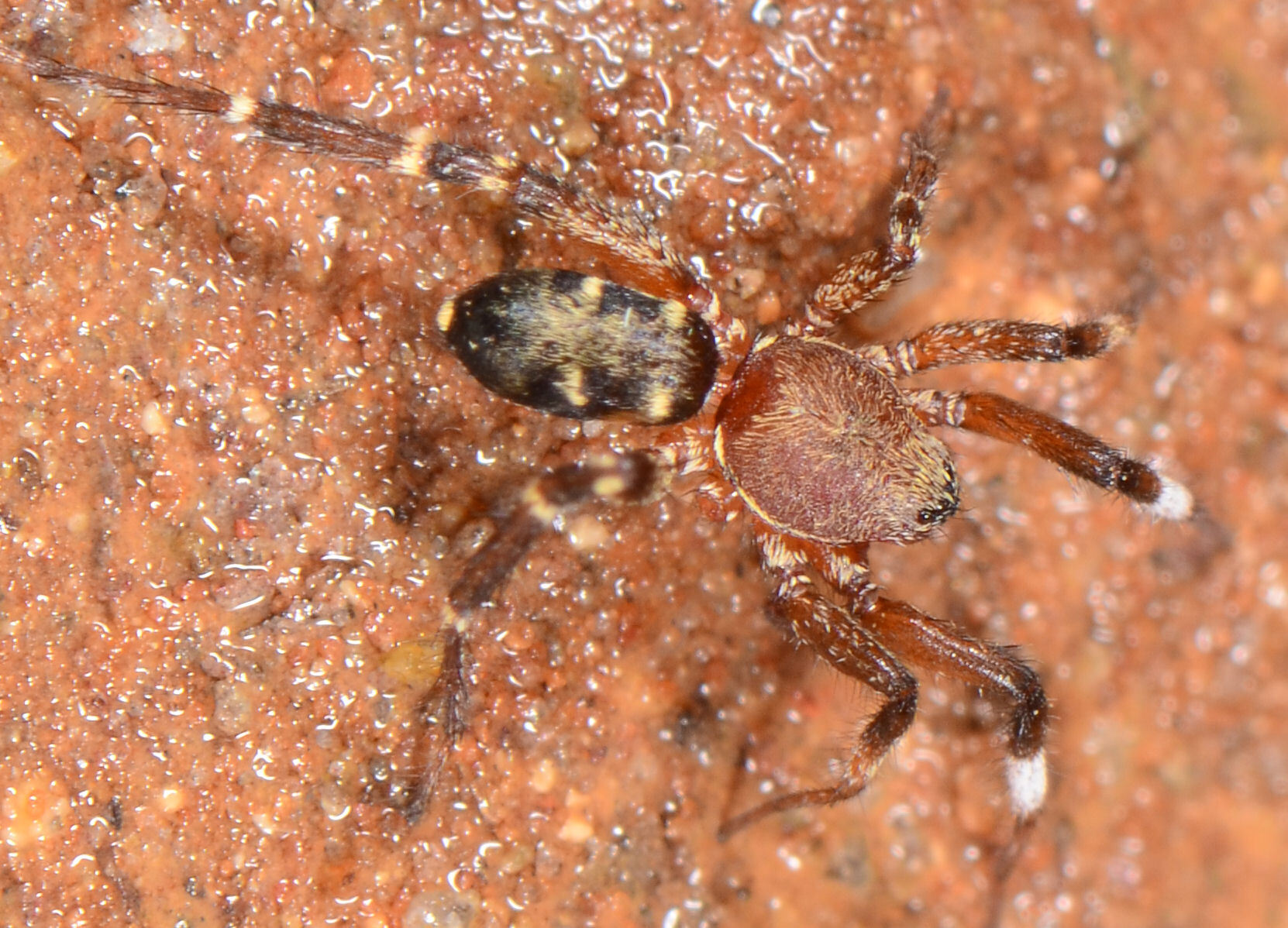
- male D. quinquelabecula
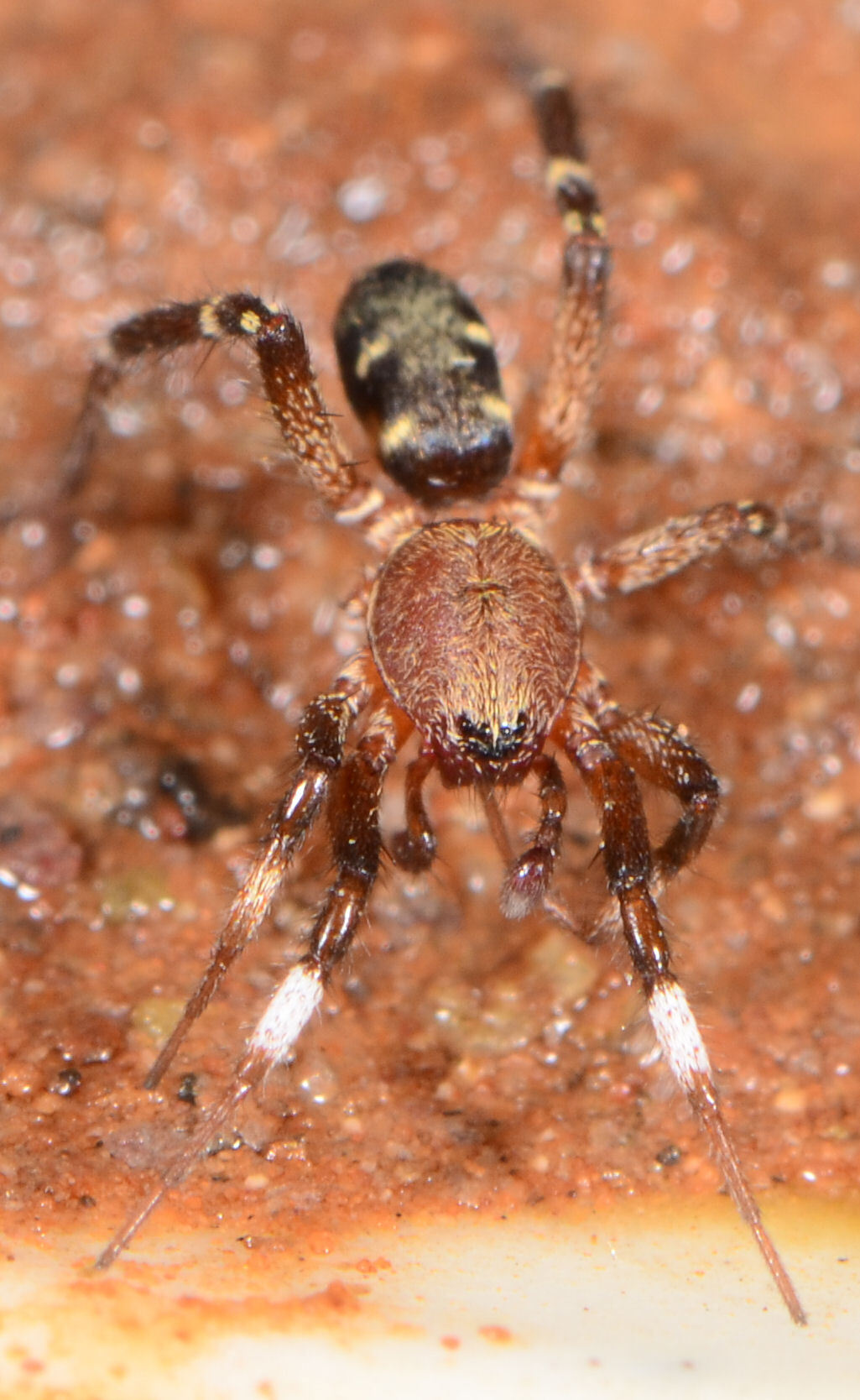

Conservation status
- Least Concern (SANBI Red List)

Scientific classification
- Kingdom: Animalia
- Phylum: Arthropoda
- Subphylum: Chelicerata
- Class: Arachnida
- Order: Araneae
- Infraorder: Araneomorphae
- Family: Gallieniellidae
- Genus: Drassodella
- Species: D. quinquelabecula

Binomial name
- Drassodella quinquelabecula Tucker, 1923

= Drassodella quinquelabecula =

Western Cape Long-Jawed Ground Spider

Species of spider

Drassodella quinquelabecula is a species of spider in the family Gallieniellidae. It is endemic to South Africa.

== Distribution ==
Drassodella quinquelabecula is endemic to the Western Cape province at elevations ranging from 8–588 m above sea level. Known localities include Caledon (type locality), De Hoop Nature Reserve, Knysna, Swartberg Nature Reserve, Aardvark Nature Reserve, and Matroosberg.

== Habitat ==
The species was sampled with pitfall traps and litter sifting from Fynbos and Nama Karoo biomes.

== Description ==
Both sexes are known. The opisthosoma is cream brown with five transverse lines on the dorsal surface.

== Conservation ==
Drassodella quinquelabecula is listed as Least Concern. While threatened in parts of its range by agricultural practices, it has a wide geographic range and is likely under-collected. The species is protected in De Hoop Nature Reserve, Swartberg Nature Reserve, and Aardvark Nature Reserve.
