= Olin platnicki =

Scientific classification
- Domain: Eukaryota
- Kingdom: Animalia
- Phylum: Arthropoda
- Subphylum: Chelicerata
- Class: Arachnida
- Order: Araneae
- Infraorder: Araneomorphae
- Family: Trachycosmidae
- Genus: Olin; Deeleman-Reinhold, 2001
- Species: O. platnicki

Binomial name
- Olin platnicki Deeleman-Reinhold, 2001

Species of spider

Olin platnicki is the only species in the monotypic spider genus Olin in the family Trachycosmidae. It is native to Christmas Island and Sulawesi.

== Taxonomy ==
The genus and species were first described in 2001 by Christa L. Deeleman-Reinhold. The generic name "Olin" was a random combination of letters, and the specific name "platnicki" is in honour of Norman Platnick.

== Characteristics ==
Olin has long and projected chelicerae, and a relatively broad and low carapace, with the maxillae long and nearly parallel, with depressions laterally. There is little sexual dimorphism and no elongation on the fourth trochanter or coxae.
