= Aroona Dam =

Former dam and reservoir in South Australia, Australia

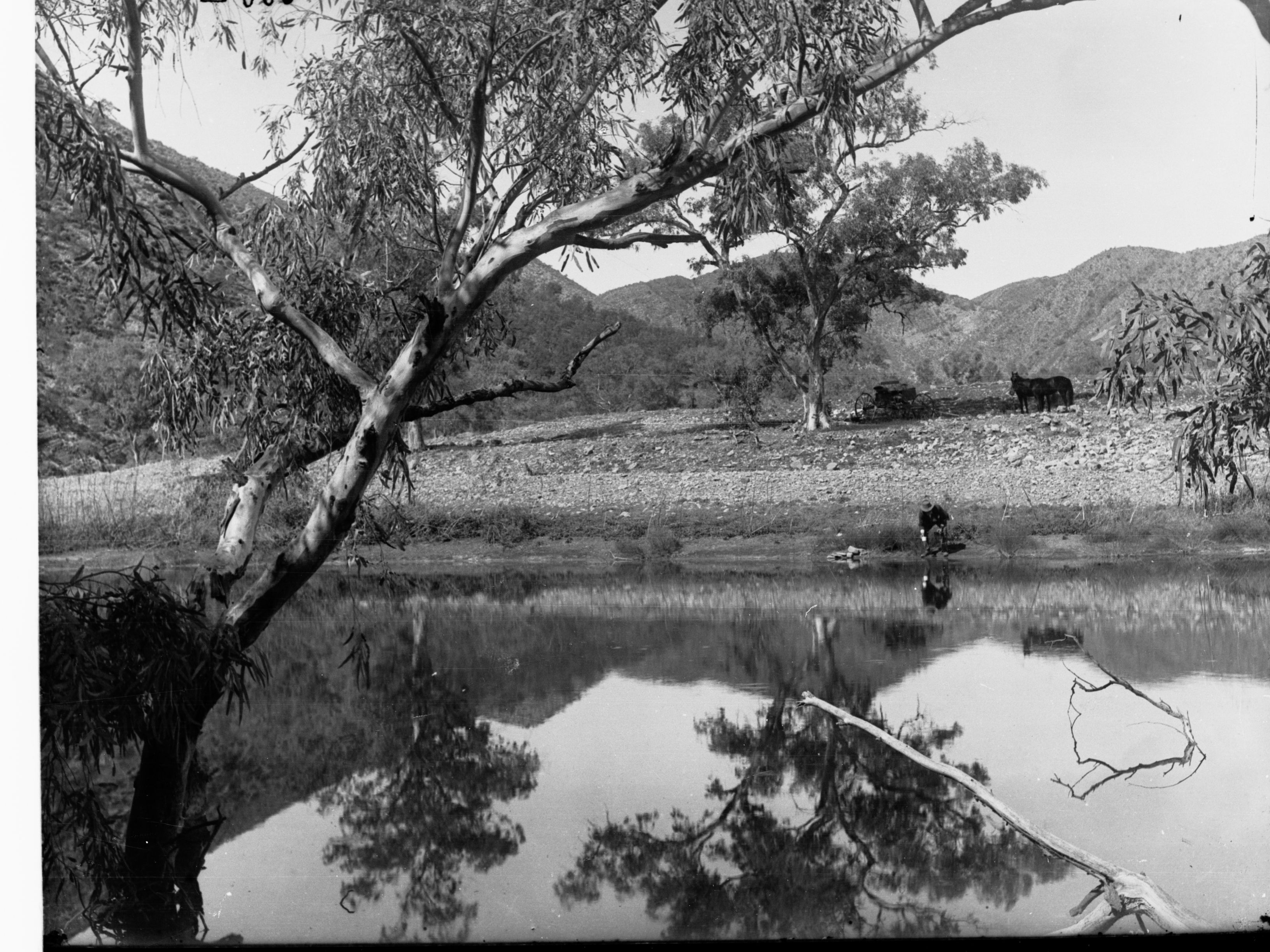
- A 1920s image of the dam reservoir

- Location of the dam in South Australia
- Interactive map of Aroona Dam
- Country: Australia
- Location: Leigh Creek, South Australia
- Coordinates: 30°35′05″S 138°21′29″E
- Purpose: Water supply (1957–2015); Recreation (since 2018)
- Status: Decommissioned
- Construction began: 1952
- Opening date: 1957
- Construction cost: A£1,000,000
- Built by: ETSA Corporation
- Owner: Government of South Australia

Dam and spillways
- Type of dam: Gravity dam
- Impounds: Aroona Creek
- Height (foundation): 26 m (85 ft)
- Length: 236 m (774 ft)
- Dam volume: 46×10^{3} m^{3} (1.6×10^{6} cu ft)
- Spillway type: Uncontrolled
- Spillway capacity: 1,415 m^{3}/s (50,000 cu ft/s)

Reservoir
- Total capacity: 7,520 ML (6,100 acre⋅ft)
- Catchment area: 684 km^{2} (264 sq mi)
- Surface area: 88 ha (220 acres)
- Maximum length: 3.5 km (2.2 mi)
- Normal elevation: 291 m (955 ft) AHD

The Aroona Dam is a decommissioned gravity dam across Aroona Creek, in the locality of Leigh Creek, near Port Augusta, in South Australia, Australia. The dam is situated approximately 5 kilometres (3.1 mi) west of the locality’s town centre. The dam was completed in 1955 to supply potable water to Leigh Creek and industrial water for the adjacent eponymous coal mine. Since c. 2015, the dam has been used solely for recreational purposes.

== Nomenclature ==
The word Aroona is listed in the official government place name gazetteer as the name of some geographic features either adjoining the dam or located within its extent. Mount Aroona is located in the ridge on the north side of the dam’s lake. A former water feature is now located “under the waters of the Aroona Dam” is named as the Aroona Waterhole as well as having the Adnyamathanha name of Arrunha Awi.

According to Clif Reed, it is believed that Aroona is a truncation of the Aboriginal word alcaroona, meaning "running water"; although another translation means "place of frogs". Samuel Perry, a surveyor, who exploded the area truncated the name and it was applied to the dam, the creek, the valley, and the mountain.

== Overview ==
The concrete gravity dam is 26 metres (85 ft) high and 236 metres (774 ft) long. The resultant reservoir has a capacity of 7,520 megalitres (6,100 acre⋅ft) when full and covers approximately 88 hectares (220 acres), draw from a catchment area of 684 square kilometres (264 sq mi).

The dam was designed and built by the Electricity Trust of South Australia from 1952 to 1957 by damming the Arrunha Creek (Note: Also known as Aroona Creek in one source and as Scott Creek in another source.) and using mainly immigrants engaged by contract for two-years and which peaked at a maximum of 160 men. Two shifts were scheduled during the winter months; and concrete pouring was not conducted between November and March due to “extreme heat.”

=== Water supply ===
Its original purpose was to supply water to the town of Leigh Creek and the Leigh Creek Coalfield which was relying on water pumped from Sliding Rock Mine located about 45 kilometres (28 mi) south-east of the current town of Leigh Creek. In 2004, it was reported as storing and supplying water to “Leigh Creek, Copley and Lyndhurst, the coalfield and several neighbouring pastoral properties” and this was being augmented in respect to Leigh Creek by water pumped from bores approximately 6 kilometres (3.7 mi) south of the town. However, in late 2016, it was advised that “water from Aroona dam will not be used for the town water supply” and that water from the bores would be treated in a reverse osmosis desalination plant located near the Leigh Creek township.

In 1995, 43 square kilometres (17 sq mi) covering the dam, reservoir, and adjoining land were declared as the Aroona Sanctuary under the National Parks and Wildlife Act 1972.

=== Recreational use ===
In April 2017, after the November 2015 closure of the Leigh Creek Coalfield, in conjunction with initiatives underway for the future re-use of the Leigh Creek township, the South Australian government commenced a study to investigate the “potential for shore-based recreational fishing access.” In 2018, the dam was repurposed for recreation use and stocked with Murray cod and golden perch.

== See also ==
- List of reservoirs and dams in South Australia
