= Aroona Sanctuary =

- Location within South Australia
- Location: South Australia
- Nearest city: Leigh Creek
- Coordinates: 30°34′24″S 138°21′10″E
- Area: 43 km^{2} (17 sq mi)
- Established: 26 October 1995
- Governing body: Electricity Trust of South Australia (1995-2000); NRG Flinders & its successors (2000 onwards)

Aroona Sanctuary is a private protected area in the Australian state of South Australia located in the gazetted localities of Leigh Creek and Puttapa and whose north-western boundary is within 1 kilometre (0.62 mi) of the locality's town centre.

The sanctuary occupies crown land in the cadastral units of the part section 373, and sections 641 and 1290, all identified as being "Out of Hundreds (COPLEY)". It occupies most of the land in the locality of Leigh Creek including the Aroona Dam with exception to land in the locality's north used for the township and the Leigh Creek Airport, the alignments of The Outback Highway and the Marree railway line, and some land at the locality's southern boundary.

Part of its extent was within the boundaries of the Myrtle Springs Station and was used for the grazing of sheep during this tenure. It was declared as "sanctuary" under the National Parks and Wildlife Act 1972 by the Government of South Australia on 26 October 1995. In 1996, it was the site of a release of a group of yellow-footed rock-wallabies, which consisted of members of the sub-species known as P. x. xanthopus and which was breed in captivity. The release was conducted by the Royal Zoological Society of South Australia, NRG Flinders and the South Australian Department of Environment and Heritage.

It was described in 2001 as follows:

Aroona Sanctuary includes the rocky Aroona range, clay plains and hill slopes, wetland and sandy desert. Camping is permitted in three designated areas within the sanctuary, but rarity of facilities means that few people utilize the camping grounds. A permanent caretaker lives in the sanctuary and NRG Flinders staff regularly visit the dam for water sampling.

As of 2016, the sanctuary was not listed as part of the Australian National Reserve System and as of 2014, it had not been given an IUCN protected area category.
