= Questo =

Scientific classification
- Kingdom: Animalia
- Phylum: Arthropoda
- Subphylum: Chelicerata
- Class: Arachnida
- Order: Araneae
- Infraorder: Araneomorphae
- Family: Trachycosmidae
- Genus: Questo; Platnick, 2002
- Species: Q. annuello

Binomial name
- Questo annuello Platnick, 2002

Genus of spiders

Questo is a monotypic genus of Australian araneomorph spiders in the family Trachycosmidae containing the single species, Questo annuello, named after where it was found, Annuello, Victoria. It was first described by Norman I. Platnick in 2002, and has only been found in Australia.
