= Longrita =

Scientific classification
- Kingdom: Animalia
- Phylum: Arthropoda
- Subphylum: Chelicerata
- Class: Arachnida
- Order: Araneae
- Infraorder: Araneomorphae
- Family: Trachycosmidae
- Genus: Longrita; Platnick

Type species
- Longrita insidiosa (Simon, 1908)

Species
- 10, see text

Genus of spiders

Longrita is a genus of spiders in the family Trachycosmidae. It was first described in 2002 by Platnick. As of 2017, it contains 10 Australian species.

== Species ==
Longrita comprises the following species:

- Longrita arcoona Platnick, 2002
- Longrita findal Platnick, 2002
- Longrita grasspatch Platnick, 2002
- Longrita insidiosa (Simon, 1908)
- Longrita millewa Platnick, 2002
- Longrita nathan Platnick, 2002
- Longrita rastellata Platnick, 2002
- Longrita whaleback Platnick, 2002
- Longrita yuinmery Platnick, 2002
- Longrita zuytdorp Platnick, 2002
