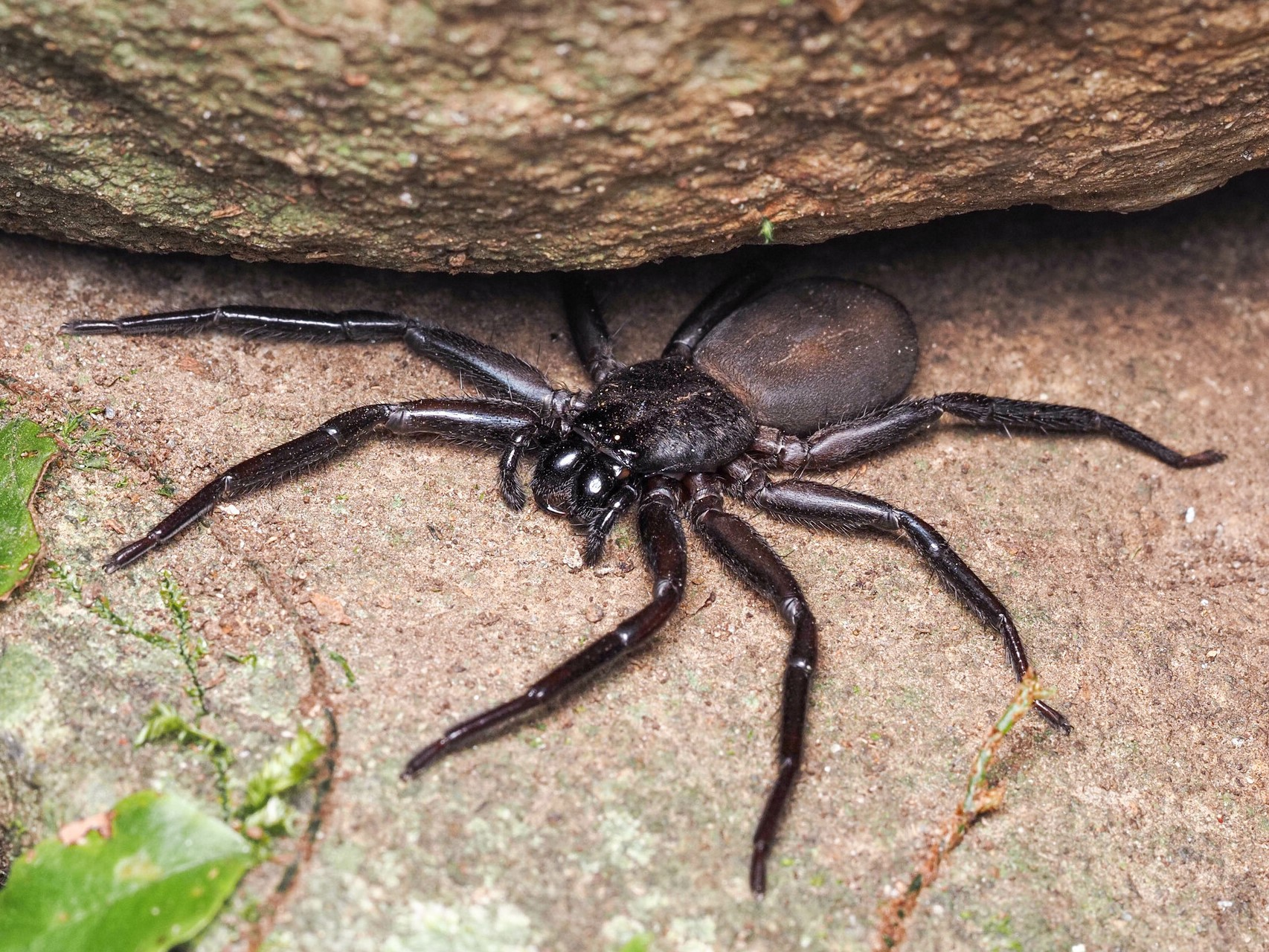
- Rebilus bulburin

Scientific classification
- Kingdom: Animalia
- Phylum: Arthropoda
- Subphylum: Chelicerata
- Class: Arachnida
- Order: Araneae
- Infraorder: Araneomorphae
- Family: Trachycosmidae
- Genus: Rebilus; Simon

Type species
- Rebilus lugubris (L. Koch, 1875)

Species
- 17, see text

= Rebilus =

Genus of spiders

Rebilus is a genus of spiders in the family Trachycosmidae. It was first described in 1880 by Simon. As of 2017, it contains 17 Australian species.

== Species ==
Rebilus comprises the following species:

- Rebilus bilpin Platnick, 2002
- Rebilus binnaburra Platnick, 2002
- Rebilus brooklana Platnick, 2002
- Rebilus bulburin Platnick, 2002
- Rebilus bunya Platnick, 2002
- Rebilus crediton Platnick, 2002
- Rebilus glorious Platnick, 2002
- Rebilus grayi Platnick, 2002
- Rebilus griswoldi Platnick, 2002
- Rebilus kaputar Platnick, 2002
- Rebilus lamington Platnick, 2002
- Rebilus lugubris (L. Koch, 1875)
- Rebilus maleny Platnick, 2002
- Rebilus monteithi Platnick, 2002
- Rebilus morton Platnick, 2002
- Rebilus tribulation Platnick, 2002
- Rebilus wisharti Platnick, 2002
