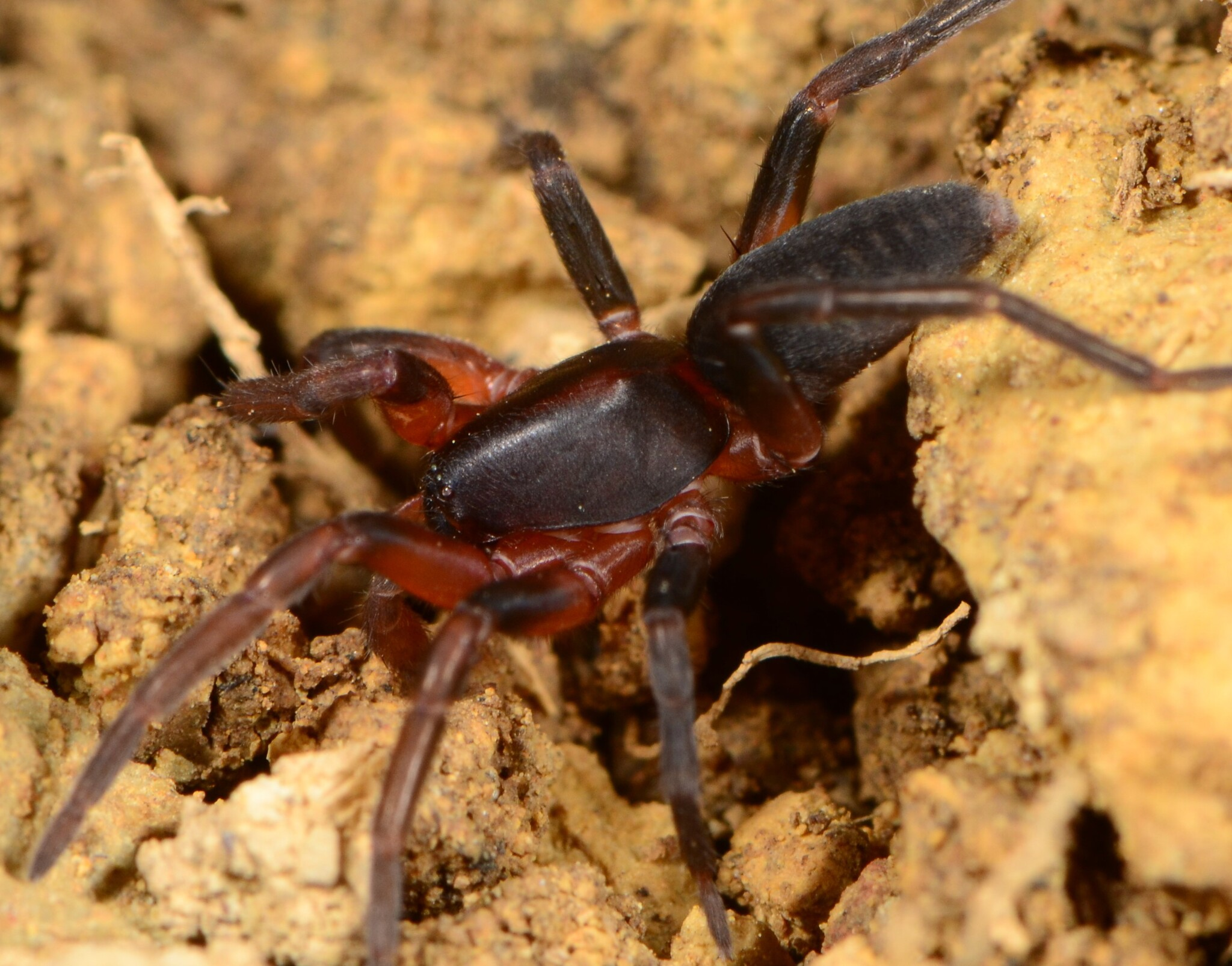
- male A. incertus

Scientific classification
- Kingdom: Animalia
- Phylum: Arthropoda
- Subphylum: Chelicerata
- Class: Arachnida
- Order: Araneae
- Infraorder: Araneomorphae
- Family: Gallieniellidae
- Genus: Austrachelas; Lawrence, 1938

Type species
- Austrachelas incertus Lawrence, 1938

Diversity
- 10 species

= Austrachelas =

Genus of spiders

Austrachelas is a genus of spiders in the family Gallieniellidae. The genus contains ten species, all endemic to South Africa.

== Taxonomy ==
The genus was transferred from the Corinnidae to the Gallieniellidae by Haddad et al. in 2009. The genus was revised by Haddad et al. (2009) and supplemented by Haddad & Mbo (2017).

== Distribution ==
All species are endemic to South Africa, distributed across the provinces of Eastern Cape, KwaZulu-Natal, Limpopo, Mpumalanga, and Northern Cape.

== Description ==
Austrachelas are medium to large-sized spiders with body length ranging from 4.7–15.3 mm. The carapace is orange-brown to bright wine-red in colour, paler along the midline, and raised evenly along the midline, sloping sharply posteriorly. The eyes are arranged in a closely situated group with the anterior eye row procurved and posterior eye row straight or very slightly recurved. Chelicerae do not protrude far beyond the anterior margin of the carapace. The opisthosoma is elongate and grey dorsally with cream chevron markings, pale laterally and ventrally. Males possess a short dorsal scutum that is absent in females. The legs have densely scopulate anterior metatarsi and tarsi with strongly spined posterior legs.

== Ecology ==
Austrachelas species are free-running ground dwellers typically sampled through visual search, pitfall traps, and litter sifting. They inhabit various biomes including Forest, Grassland, Savanna, and Indian Ocean Coastal Belt.

== Species ==
As of September 2025, the genus contains ten species:

- Austrachelas bergi Haddad, Lyle, Bosselaers & Ramírez, 2009 – South Africa
- Austrachelas entabeni Haddad & Mbo, 2017 – South Africa
- Austrachelas incertus Lawrence, 1938 – South Africa
- Austrachelas kalaharinus Haddad, Lyle, Bosselaers & Ramírez, 2009 – South Africa
- Austrachelas merwei Haddad, Lyle, Bosselaers & Ramírez, 2009 – South Africa
- Austrachelas natalensis Lawrence, 1942 – South Africa
- Austrachelas pondoensis Haddad, Lyle, Bosselaers & Ramírez, 2009 – South Africa
- Austrachelas reavelli Haddad, Lyle, Bosselaers & Ramírez, 2009 – South Africa
- Austrachelas sexoculatus Haddad, Lyle, Bosselaers & Ramírez, 2009 – South Africa
- Austrachelas wassenaari Haddad, Lyle, Bosselaers & Ramírez, 2009 – South Africa
