= Fissarena =

Scientific classification
- Domain: Eukaryota
- Kingdom: Animalia
- Phylum: Arthropoda
- Subphylum: Chelicerata
- Class: Arachnida
- Order: Araneae
- Infraorder: Araneomorphae
- Family: Trachycosmidae
- Genus: Fissarena; Dickman

Type species
- Fissarena ethabuka Henschel, Davies & Dickman, 1995

Species
- 9, see text

Genus of spiders

Fissarena is a genus of spiders in the family Trachycosmidae. It was first described in 1995 by Henschel, Davies & Dickman. As of 2017, it contains 9 Australian species.

== Species ==
Fissarena comprises the following species:

- Fissarena arcoona Platnick, 2002
- Fissarena barlee Platnick, 2002
- Fissarena barrow Platnick, 2002
- Fissarena castanea (Simon, 1908)
- Fissarena cuny Platnick, 2002
- Fissarena ethabuka Henschel, Davies & Dickman, 1995
- Fissarena laverton Platnick, 2002
- Fissarena longipes (Hogg, 1896)
- Fissarena woodleigh Platnick, 2002
