= Neato (spider) =

Scientific classification
- Kingdom: Animalia
- Phylum: Arthropoda
- Subphylum: Chelicerata
- Class: Arachnida
- Order: Araneae
- Infraorder: Araneomorphae
- Family: Trachycosmidae
- Genus: Neato; Platnick, 2002

Type species
- N. walli Platnick, 2002

Species
- 7, see text

Genus of spiders

Neato is a genus of Australian araneomorph spiders in the family Trachycosmidae, and was first described by Norman I. Platnick in 2002.

== Species ==
As of May 2019 it contains seven species:

- Neato arid Platnick, 2002 – Australia (Western Australia)
- Neato barrine Platnick, 2002 – Australia (Queensland)
- Neato beerwah Platnick, 2002 – Australia (Queensland, New South Wales)
- Neato kioloa Platnick, 2002 – Australia (New South Wales, Victoria)
- Neato palms Platnick, 2002 – Australia (New South Wales)
- Neato raveni Platnick, 2002 – Australia (Queensland)
- Neato walli Platnick, 2002 (type) – Australia (Queensland, New South Wales, Victoria)
