= Gallieniella =

Scientific classification
- Kingdom: Animalia
- Phylum: Arthropoda
- Subphylum: Chelicerata
- Class: Arachnida
- Order: Araneae
- Infraorder: Araneomorphae
- Family: Gallieniellidae
- Genus: Gallieniella; Millot, 1947

Type species
- G. mygaloides Millot, 1947

Species
- 4, see text

Genus of spiders

Gallieniella is a genus of East African araneomorph spiders in the family Gallieniellidae, and was first described by J. Millot in 1947. Originally placed with the sac spiders, it was moved to the Gallieniellidae in 1967.

== Species ==
As of October 2025, this genus includes four species:

- Gallieniella betroka Platnick, 1984 – Madagascar
- Gallieniella blanci Platnick, 1984 – Madagascar
- Gallieniella jocquei Platnick, 1984 – Comoros
- Gallieniella mygaloides Millot, 1947 – Madagascar (type species)
