= Galianoella =

Scientific classification
- Kingdom: Animalia
- Phylum: Arthropoda
- Subphylum: Chelicerata
- Class: Arachnida
- Order: Araneae
- Infraorder: Araneomorphae
- Family: Gallieniellidae
- Genus: Galianoella; Goloboff, 2000
- Species: G. leucostigma

Binomial name
- Galianoella leucostigma (Mello-Leitão, 1941)

Genus of spiders

Galianoella is a monotypic genus of South American araneomorph spiders in the family Gallieniellidae containing the single species, Galianoella leucostigma. It was first described by Pablo A. Goloboff in 2000, breaking it off from Azilia. It has only been found in Argentina. The genus is named in honour of María Elena Galiano.
