= Legendrena =

Scientific classification
- Kingdom: Animalia
- Phylum: Arthropoda
- Subphylum: Chelicerata
- Class: Arachnida
- Order: Araneae
- Infraorder: Araneomorphae
- Family: Gallieniellidae
- Genus: Legendrena; Platnick, 1984

Type species
- L. angavokely Platnick, 1984

Species
- 7, see text

Genus of spiders

Legendrena is a genus of East African araneomorph spiders in the family Gallieniellidae, and was first described by Norman I. Platnick in 1984.

All species are endemic to Madagascar.

== Species ==
As of October 2025, this genus includes seven species:

- Legendrena angavokely Platnick, 1984 (type species)
- Legendrena perinet Platnick, 1984
- Legendrena rolandi Platnick, 1984
- Legendrena rothi Platnick, 1995
- Legendrena spiralis Platnick, 1995
- Legendrena steineri Platnick, 1990
- Legendrena tamatave Platnick, 1984
