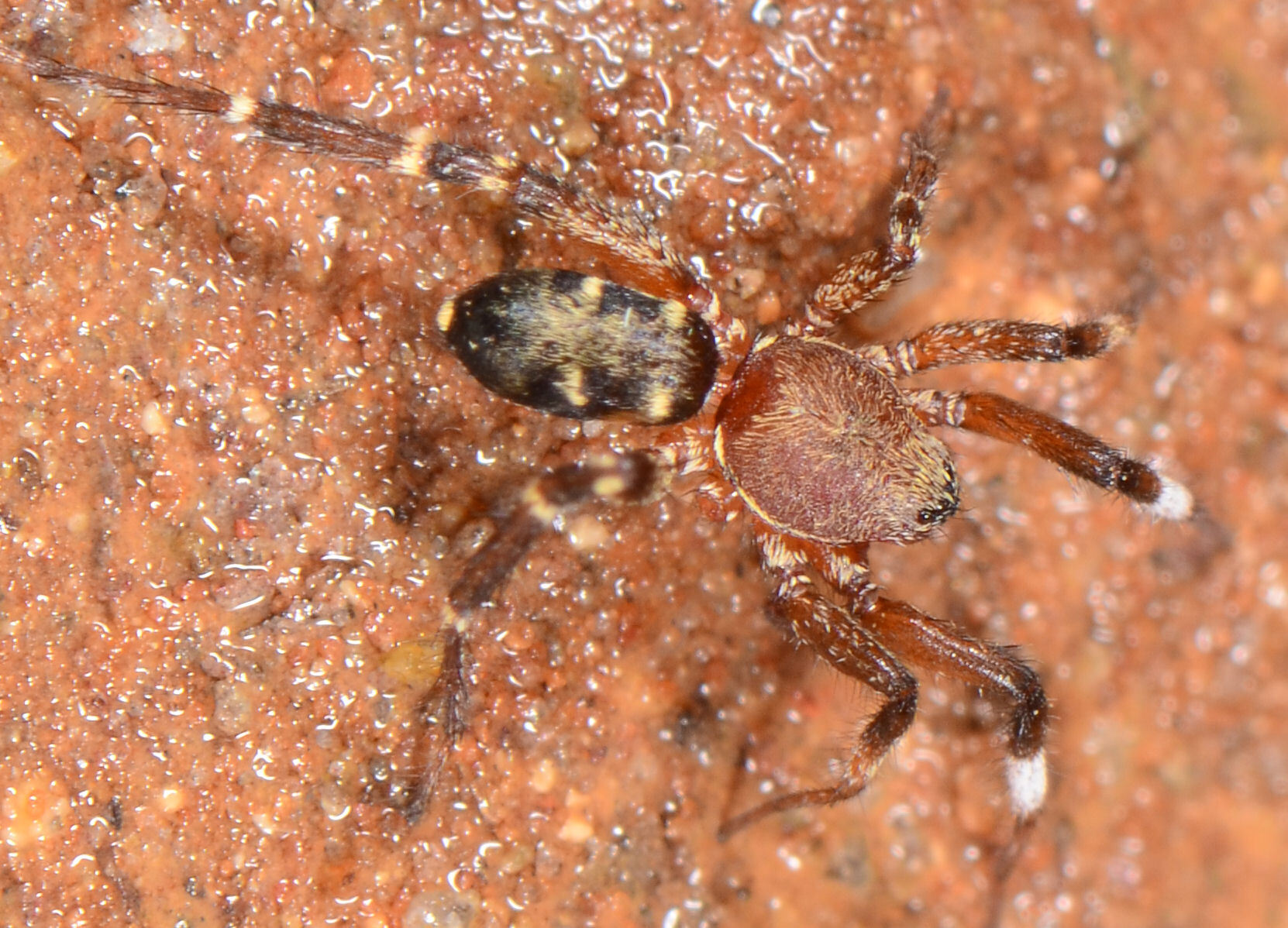
- male D. quinquelabecula

Scientific classification
- Kingdom: Animalia
- Phylum: Arthropoda
- Subphylum: Chelicerata
- Class: Arachnida
- Order: Araneae
- Infraorder: Araneomorphae
- Family: Gallieniellidae
- Genus: Drassodella; Hewitt, 1916

Type species
- Drassodella salisburyi Hewitt, 1916

Diversity
- 19 species

= Drassodella =

Genus of spiders

Drassodella is a genus of spiders in the family Gallieniellidae. The genus contains 19 species, all endemic to South Africa.

== Etymology ==
The genus name is a variation on the related genus Drassodes.

== Taxonomy ==
The genus was transferred from the Gnaphosidae to the Gallieniellidae by Platnick in 1990. The genus was comprehensively revised by Mbo & Haddad in 2019.

== Distribution ==
All species are endemic to South Africa and occur in all floral biomes except Desert. The highest species richness is found in the Forest and Fynbos biomes (eight species each) and the Savanna biome (five species).

== Description ==
Small to medium spiders with body length ranging from 2.5 to 10 mm. The carapace is broad and oval, with the cephalic region slightly narrowed and broadest between coxae II and III. Eight eyes are arranged in two rows, with lateral eyes set on low tubercles. The chelicerae are usually moderately protruding in males and slightly angled or vertically orientated in females. The opisthosoma is oval-elongate, often with golden, yellow, white, or cream dorsal stripes or spots, or without markings, on a black or grey background. The legs are long and moderately thin with leg formula 4123. Anterior pairs of legs are weakly spined, while posterior pairs are moderately to strongly spined.

== Ecology ==
Drassodella species are fast-moving ground-dwellers frequently collected under small rocks and stones, in pitfall traps, or by litter sifting. They are sometimes encountered in close association with ants and are proposed to be stenophagous specialists with a narrow diet breadth.

== Species ==
As of September 2025, the genus contains 19 species, all endemic to South Africa:

- Drassodella amatola Mbo & Haddad, 2019
- Drassodella aurostriata Mbo & Haddad, 2019
- Drassodella baviaans Mbo & Haddad, 2019
- Drassodella flava Mbo & Haddad, 2019
- Drassodella guttata Mbo & Haddad, 2019
- Drassodella lotzi Mbo & Haddad, 2019
- Drassodella maculata Mbo & Haddad, 2019
- Drassodella melana Tucker, 1923
- Drassodella montana Mbo & Haddad, 2019
- Drassodella purcelli Tucker, 1923
- Drassodella quinquelabecula Tucker, 1923
- Drassodella salisburyi Hewitt, 1916
- Drassodella septemmaculata (Strand, 1909)
- Drassodella tenebrosa Lawrence, 1938
- Drassodella tolkieni Mbo & Haddad, 2019
- Drassodella transversa Mbo & Haddad, 2019
- Drassodella trilineata Mbo & Haddad, 2019
- Drassodella vasivulva Tucker, 1923
- Drassodella venda Mbo & Haddad, 2019
