= Peeto =

Scientific classification
- Kingdom: Animalia
- Phylum: Arthropoda
- Subphylum: Chelicerata
- Class: Arachnida
- Order: Araneae
- Infraorder: Araneomorphae
- Family: Trachycosmidae
- Genus: Peeto; Platnick, 2002
- Species: P. rodmani

Binomial name
- Peeto rodmani Platnick, 2002

Genus of spiders

Peeto is a monotypic genus of Australian araneomorph spiders in the family Trachycosmidae containing the single species, Peeto rodmani. It was first described by Norman I. Platnick in 2002, and has only been found in Australia.
