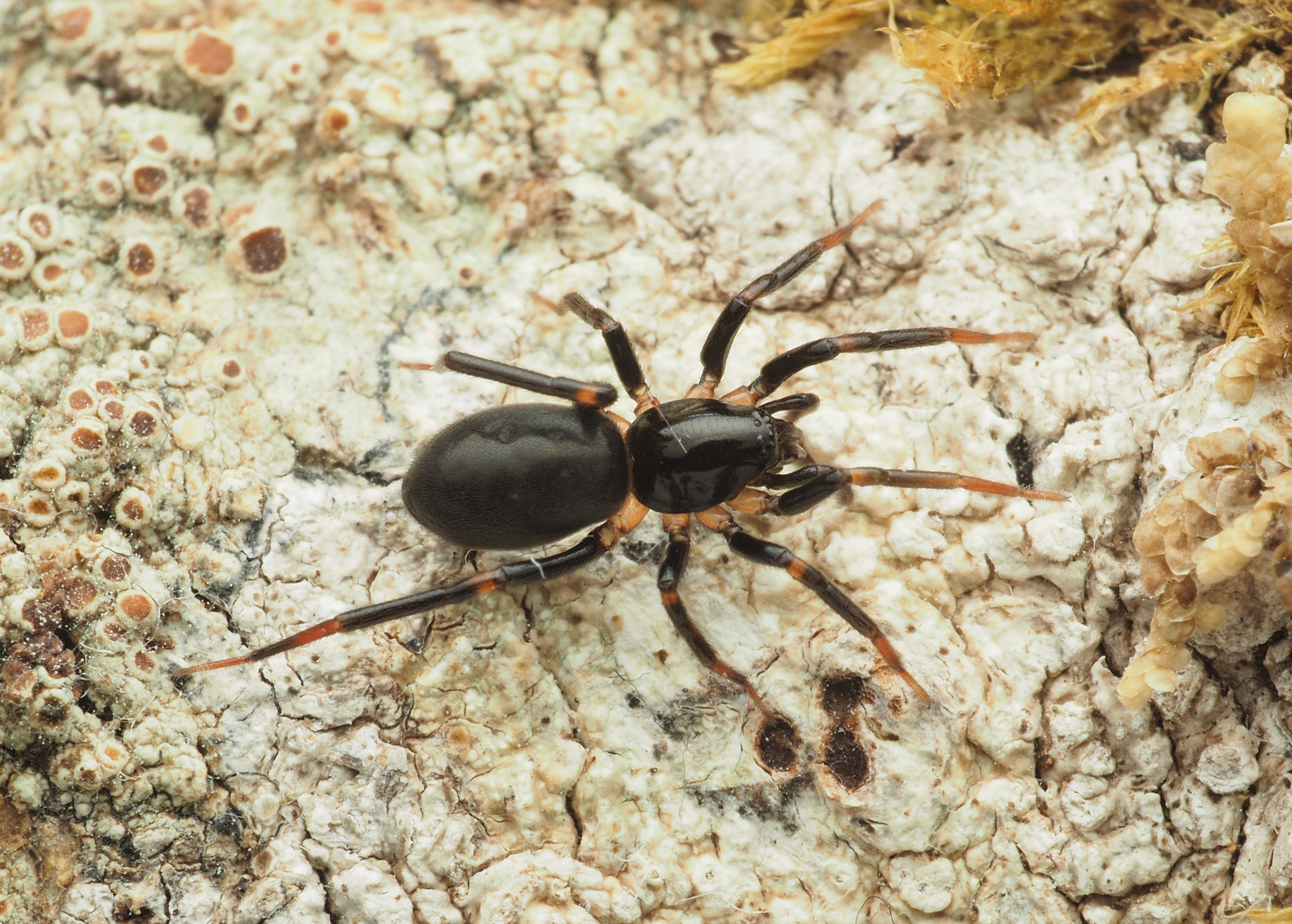
- Neato beerwah in Australia
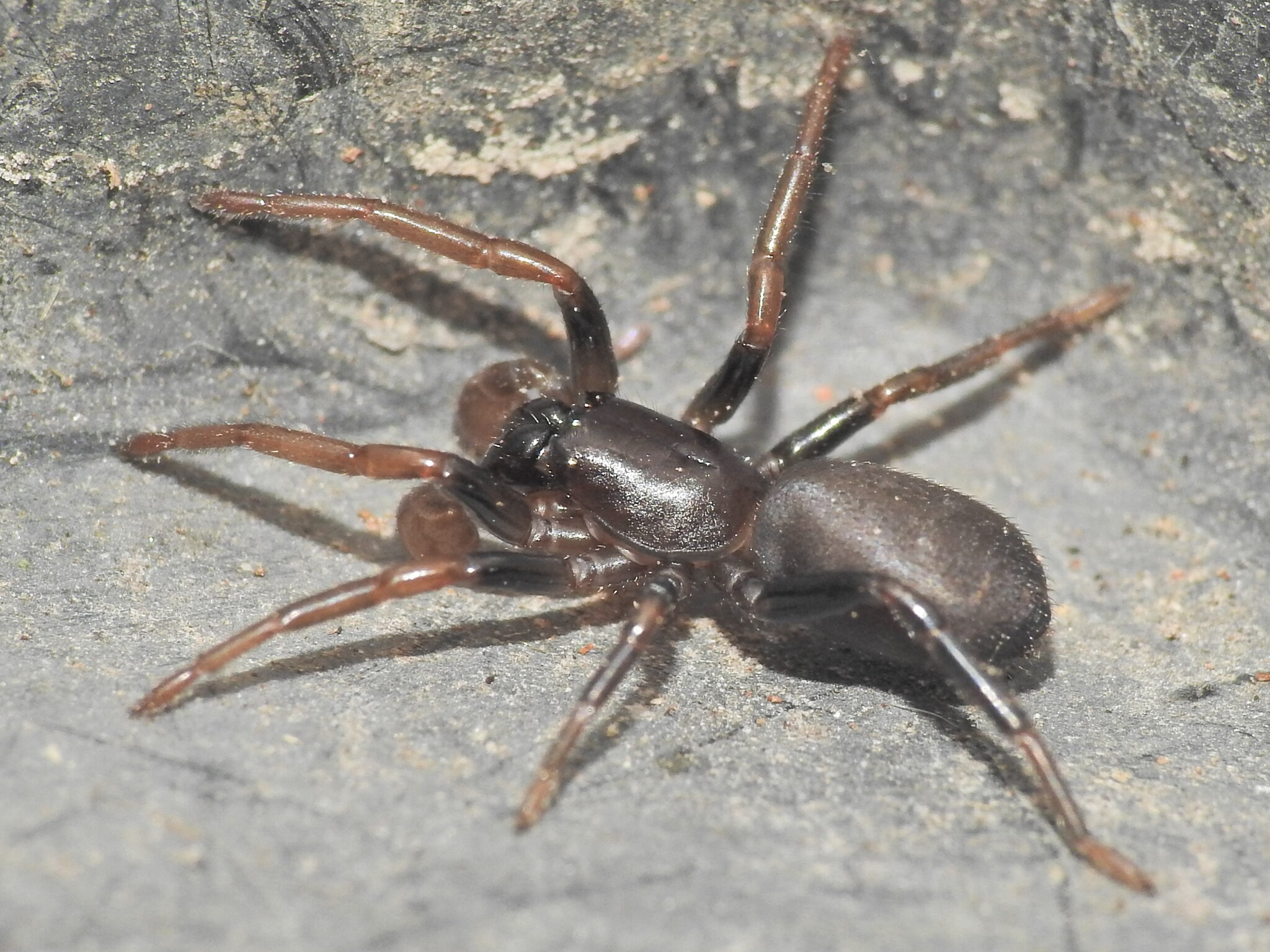
- Desognaphosa sp. in Australia

Scientific classification
- Kingdom: Animalia
- Phylum: Arthropoda
- Subphylum: Chelicerata
- Class: Arachnida
- Order: Araneae
- Infraorder: Araneomorphae
- Family: Trachycosmidae; Platnick, 2002

Type genus
- Trachycosmus Simon, 1893

Diversity
- 20 genera, 148 species
- blue: reported countries (WSC)

= Trachycosmidae =

Family of spiders

Trachycosmidae, is a family of spiders in the infraorder Araneomorphae.

Most genera now grouped in Trachycosmidae were formerly part of the families Trochanteriidae and Gallieniellidae:

== Identification ==
They can be identified by the lateral spinnerets, which are separated by the length of their diameter and have their complete distal article without inflatable area. The presence of two major ampullate gland spigots and the epigynal field formed by an undivided plate. The lens of the anterior lateral eyes are convex, raised from the surrounding cuticle, which in Trochanteriidae is flat.

== Genera ==
As of January 2026, this family includes twenty genera and 148 species:

- Boolathana Platnick, 2002 – Australia
- Desognanops Platnick, 2008 – Australia
- Desognaphosa Platnick, 2002 – Australia, Solomon Islands
- Fissarena Henschel, Davies & Dickman, 1995 – Australia
- Hemicloeina Simon, 1893 – Australia, New Guinea
- Longrita Platnick, 2002 – Australia
- Meedo Main, 1987 – Australia
- Morebilus Platnick, 2002 – Australia
- Neato Platnick, 2002 – Australia
- Olin Deeleman-Reinhold, 2001 – Indonesia, Australia
- Oreo Platnick, 2002 – Australia
- Peeto Platnick, 2002 – Australia
- Platorish Platnick, 2002 – Australia
- Pyrnus Simon, 1880 – Australia, New Caledonia
- Questo Platnick, 2002 – Australia
- Rebilus Simon, 1880 – Australia
- Tinytrema Platnick, 2002 – Australia
- Trachycosmus Simon, 1893 – Australia
- Trachyspina Platnick, 2002 – Australia
- Trachytrema Simon, 1909 – Australia
