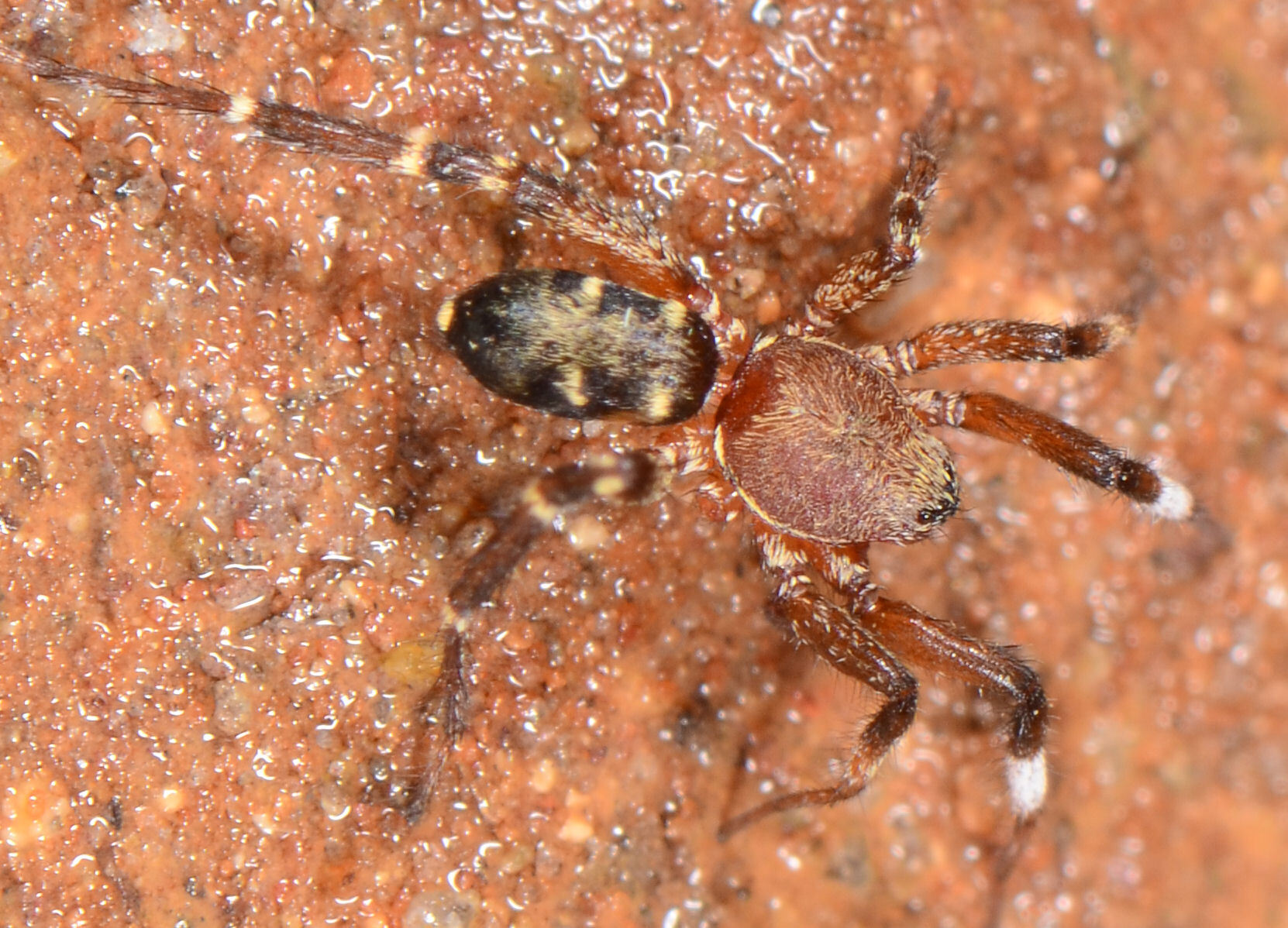
- male D. quinquelabecula

Scientific classification
- Kingdom: Animalia
- Phylum: Arthropoda
- Subphylum: Chelicerata
- Class: Arachnida
- Order: Araneae
- Infraorder: Araneomorphae
- Family: Gallieniellidae; Millot, 1947

Diversity
- 5 genera, 41 species
- blue: reported countries (WSC)

= Gallieniellidae =

Family of spiders

Gallieniellidae is a family of spiders first described by J. Millot in 1947. It was originally thought to be endemic to Madagascar until species were also found in southern Kenya, northeastern Argentina, and Australia. Drassodella was transferred from the family Gnaphosidae in 1990. They are suspected to be specialized in ant-preying.

== Genera ==
As of October 2025, this family includes five genera and 41 species:

- Austrachelas Lawrence, 1938 – South Africa
- Drassodella Hewitt, 1916 – South Africa
- Galianoella Goloboff, 2000 – Argentina
- Gallieniella Millot, 1947 – Comoros, Madagascar
- Legendrena Platnick, 1984 – Madagascar
