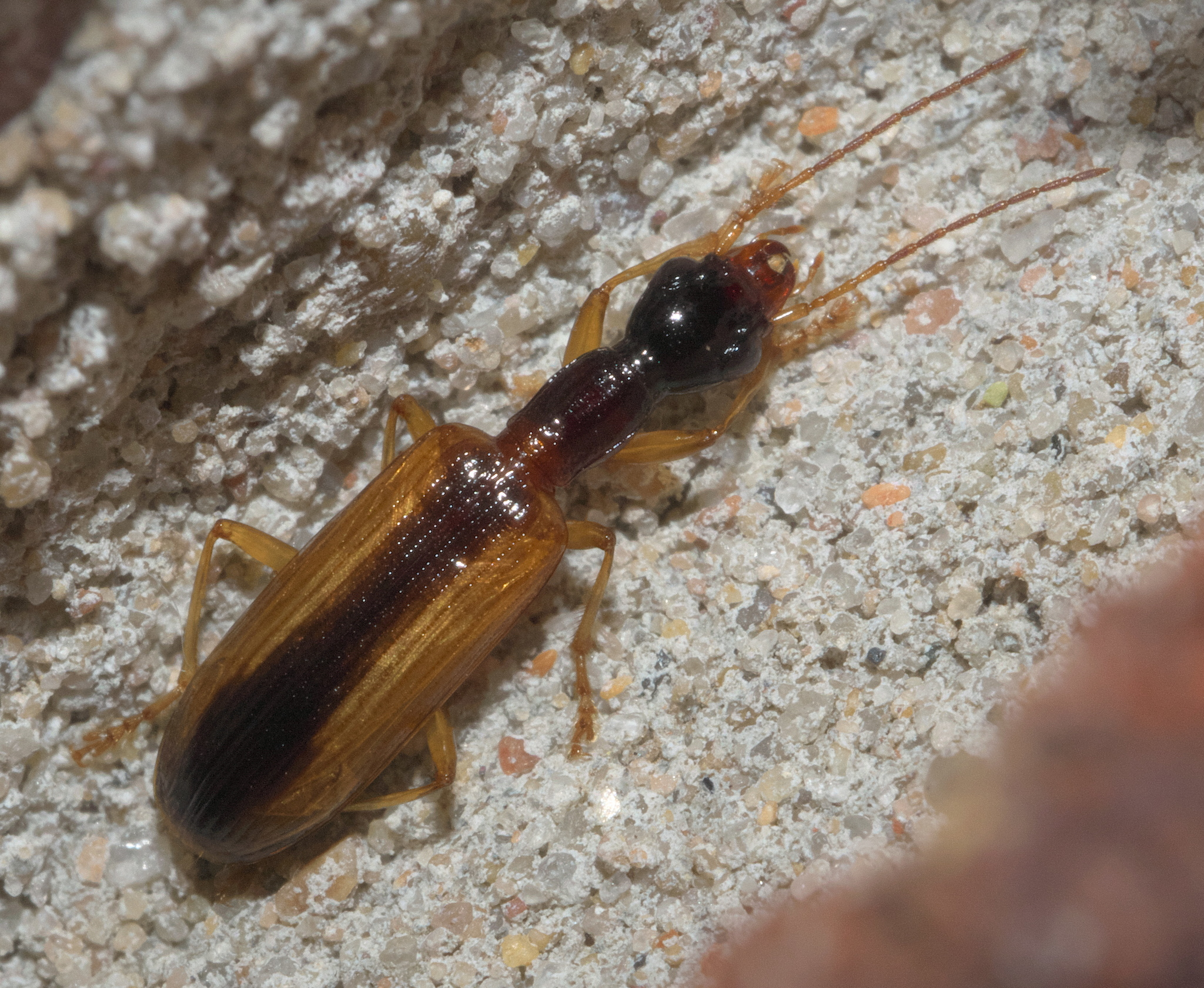
- Leptotrachelus dorsalis, Oklahoma

Scientific classification
- Domain: Eukaryota
- Kingdom: Animalia
- Phylum: Arthropoda
- Class: Insecta
- Order: Coleoptera
- Suborder: Adephaga
- Family: Carabidae
- Subfamily: Ctenodactylinae; Laporte, 1834

Tribes
- Ctenodactylini Laporte, 1834; Hexagoniini G.Horn, 1881

= Ctenodactylinae =

Subfamily of beetles

Ctenodactylinae is a subfamily of beetles in the family Carabidae.

== Species ==
It contains the following genera:

Tribe Ctenodactylini Laporte, 1834
Alachnothorax Liebke, 1929
Amblycoleus Chaudoir, 1872
Antipionycha Liebke, 1928
Askalaphium Liebke, 1938
Ctenodactyla Dejean, 1825
Leptotrachelon Liebke, 1928
Leptotrachelus Latreille, 1829
Oilea Liebke, 1931
Parapionycha Liebke, 1929
Pionycha Chaudoir, 1848
Plagiotelum Solier, 1849
Propionycha Liebke, 1928
Pseudometabletus Liebke, 1930
Schidonychus Klug, 1834
Teukrus Liebke, 1931
Wate Liebke, 1928
Tribe Hexagoniini G.Horn, 1881
Dinopelma Bates, 1889
Hexagonia Kirby, 1825
Omphreoides Fairmaire, 1896
