= Hexagonia =

Hexagonia may refer to:

- Hexagonia (beetle), a genus of beetles in the family Carabidae
- Hexagonia (fungus), a genus of fungi in the family Polyporaceae
- Hexagonia (chess variant), published in 1864

== See also ==
- Hexagonaria, a genus of colonial rugose coral
