= Amblycoleus =

Scientific classification
- Kingdom: Animalia
- Phylum: Arthropoda
- Class: Insecta
- Order: Coleoptera
- Suborder: Adephaga
- Family: Carabidae
- Subfamily: Ctenodactylinae
- Genus: Amblycoleus; Chaudoir, 1872

Genus of beetles

Amblycoleus is a genus of beetles in the family Carabidae, containing the following species:

- Amblycoleus douei Chaudoir, 1872
- Amblycoleus peruanus Liebke, 1928
- Amblycoleus platyderus (Chaudoir, 1861)
- Amblycoleus pluriseriatus (Chaudoir, 1877)
