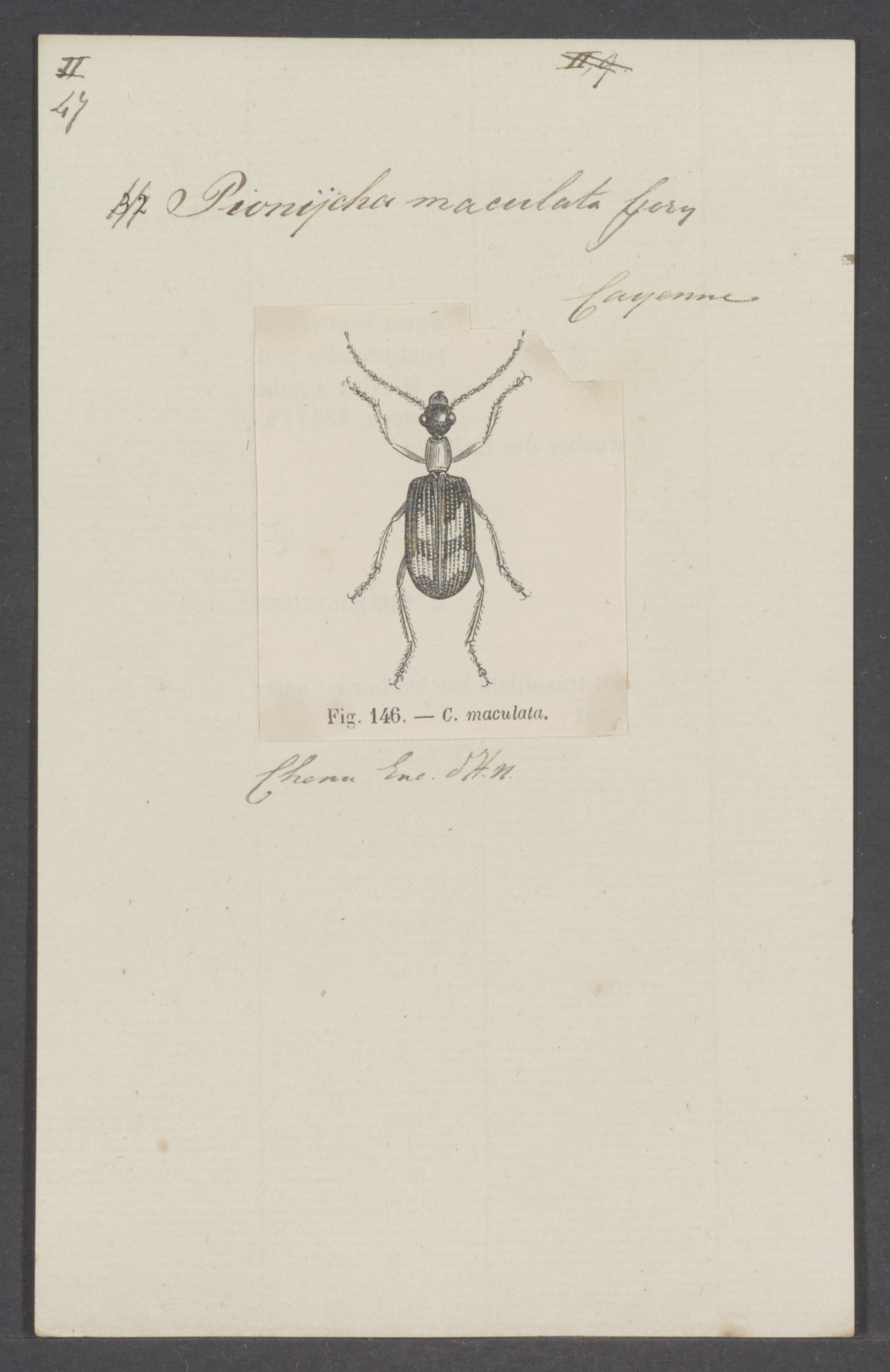
- Pionycha sp.

Scientific classification
- Domain: Eukaryota
- Kingdom: Animalia
- Phylum: Arthropoda
- Class: Insecta
- Order: Coleoptera
- Suborder: Adephaga
- Family: Carabidae
- Subfamily: Ctenodactylinae
- Tribe: Ctenodactylini
- Genus: Pionycha; Chaudoir, 1848

= Pionycha =

Genus of beetles

Pionycha is a genus in the ground beetle family Carabidae. There are at least three described species in Pionycha, found in South America.

== Species ==
These three species belong to the genus Pionycha:

- Pionycha maculata (Gory, 1833) (Argentina, French Guiana, Brazil)
- Pionycha pallens Lucas, 1857 (Argentina, Paraguay, Uruguay, Brazil)
- Pionycha tristis (Gory, 1833) (Argentina, Brazil)
