= Alachnothorax =

Alachnothorax bruchi

Scientific classification
- Kingdom: Animalia
- Phylum: Arthropoda
- Class: Insecta
- Order: Coleoptera
- Suborder: Adephaga
- Family: Carabidae
- Subfamily: Ctenodactylinae
- Genus: Alachnothorax; Liebke, 1929
- Species: A. bruchi

Binomial name
- Alachnothorax bruchi Liebke, 1929

Genus of beetles

Alachnothorax bruchi is a species of beetle in the family Carabidae, the only species in the genus Alachnothorax.
