= Antipionycha =

Antipionycha puncticollis

Scientific classification
- Kingdom: Animalia
- Phylum: Arthropoda
- Class: Insecta
- Order: Coleoptera
- Suborder: Adephaga
- Family: Carabidae
- Subfamily: Ctenodactylinae
- Genus: Antipionycha; Liebke, 1928
- Species: A. puncticollis

Binomial name
- Antipionycha puncticollis Liebke, 1928

Genus of beetles

Antipionycha puncticollis is a species of beetle in the family Carabidae, the only species in the genus Antipionycha.
