= Plagiotelum =

Scientific classification
- Domain: Eukaryota
- Kingdom: Animalia
- Phylum: Arthropoda
- Class: Insecta
- Order: Coleoptera
- Suborder: Adephaga
- Family: Carabidae
- Subfamily: Ctenodactylinae
- Tribe: Ctenodactylini
- Genus: Plagiotelum; Solier, 1849

Genus of beetles

Plagiotelum is a genus in the ground beetle family Carabidae. There are at least two described species in Plagiotelum.

== Species ==
These two species belong to the genus Plagiotelum:

- Plagiotelum irinum (Blanchard, 1842) (Chile, Argentina, Paraguay)
- Plagiotelum opalescens Olliff, 1885 (Australia)
