= Teukrus =

Scientific classification
- Domain: Eukaryota
- Kingdom: Animalia
- Phylum: Arthropoda
- Class: Insecta
- Order: Coleoptera
- Suborder: Adephaga
- Family: Carabidae
- Subfamily: Ctenodactylinae
- Tribe: Ctenodactylini
- Genus: Teukrus; Liebke, 1931

Genus of beetles

Teukrus is a genus of beetles in the family Carabidae, containing the following species. They are found in Peru and Brazil.

- Teukrus bifasciatus (Bates, 1871)
- Teukrus cruciatus (Bates, 1871)
