= Ctenodactyla =

Scientific classification
- Kingdom: Animalia
- Phylum: Arthropoda
- Class: Insecta
- Order: Coleoptera
- Suborder: Adephaga
- Family: Carabidae
- Subfamily: Ctenodactylinae
- Tribe: Ctenodactylini
- Genus: Ctenodactyla; Dejean, 1825

Genus of beetles

Ctenodactyla is a genus in the ground beetle family Carabidae. There are about 10 described species in Ctenodactyla, found in South America.

== Species ==
These 10 species belong to the genus Ctenodactyla:

- Ctenodactyla angusta Liebke, 1938 (Brazil)
- Ctenodactyla batesii Chaudoir, 1861 (Ecuador, Peru, and Brazil)
- Ctenodactyla brasiliensis Lucas, 1857 (Brazil)
- Ctenodactyla chevrolatii Dejean, 1825 (French Guiana and Brazil)
- Ctenodactyla drapiezi Gory, 1833 (French Guiana and Brazil)
- Ctenodactyla elegantula Liebke, 1931 (Brazil)
- Ctenodactyla glabrata Bates, 1871 (Brazil)
- Ctenodactyla langsdorfii Klug, 1834 (Peru and Brazil)
- Ctenodactyla puncticollis Chaudoir, 1862 (French Guiana)
- Ctenodactyla santarema Liebke, 1933 (Brazil)
