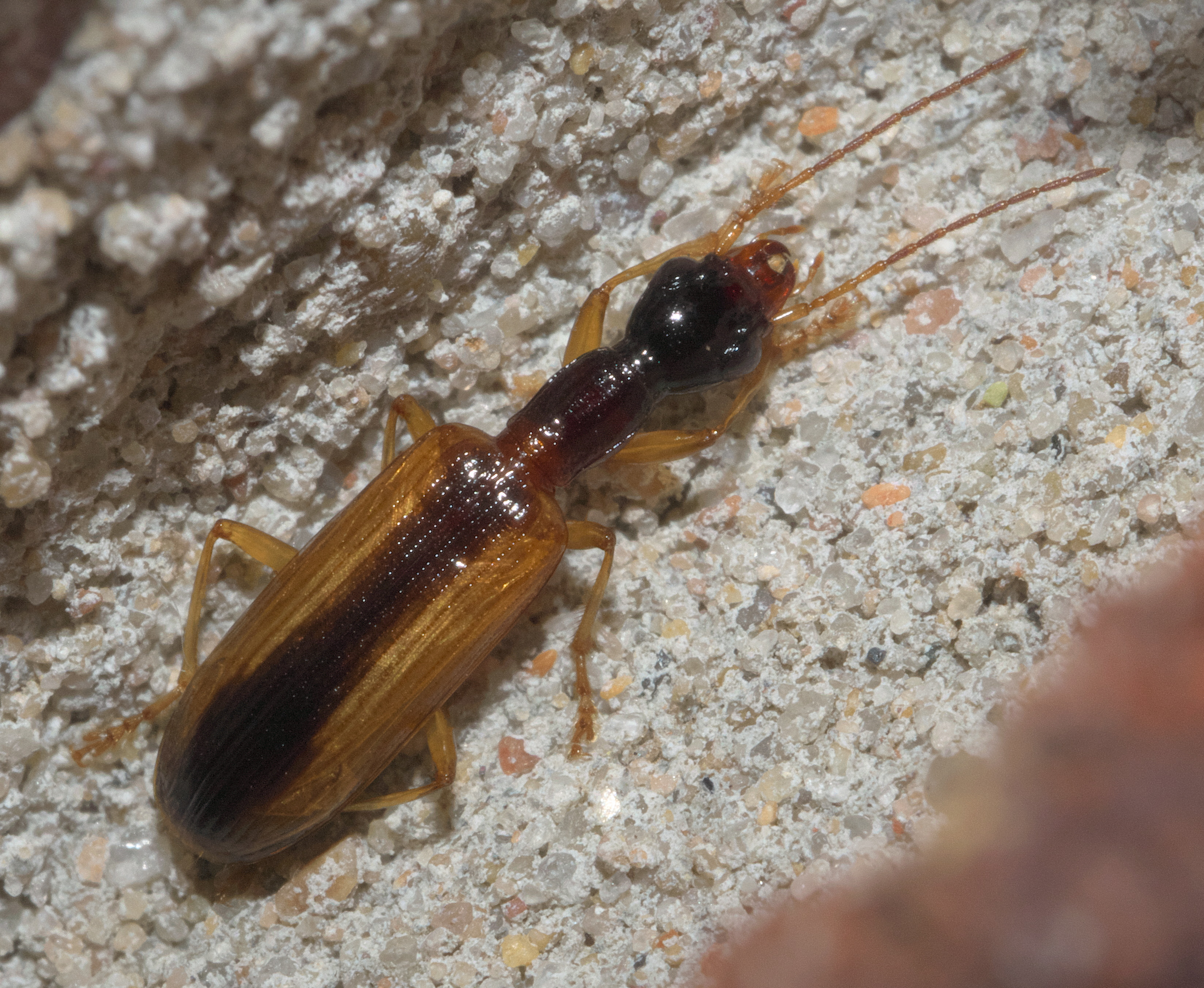
- Leptotrachelus dorsalis

Scientific classification
- Kingdom: Animalia
- Phylum: Arthropoda
- Class: Insecta
- Order: Coleoptera
- Suborder: Adephaga
- Family: Carabidae
- Subfamily: Ctenodactylinae
- Tribe: Ctenodactylini
- Genus: Leptotrachelus; Latreille, 1829

= Leptotrachelus =

Genus of beetles

Leptotrachelus is a genus of ground beetles in the family Carabidae. There are more than 30 described species in Leptotrachelus.

== Species ==
These 37 species belong to the genus Leptotrachelus:

- Leptotrachelus aequinoctialis (Chaudoir, 1848) (Colombia)
- Leptotrachelus amplipennis Liebke, 1928 (Brazil)
- Leptotrachelus basalis (Perty, 1830) (Brazil)
- Leptotrachelus brevicollis Boheman, 1858 (Argentina and Brazil)
- Leptotrachelus bruchi Liebke, 1928 (Argentina)
- Leptotrachelus compresus Zayas, 1988 (Cuba)
- Leptotrachelus cruciger Liebke, 1938 (Brazil)
- Leptotrachelus cubanus Zayas, 1988 (Cuba)
- Leptotrachelus debilis Chaudoir, 1872 (Brazil)
- Leptotrachelus depressus Blatchley, 1923 (North America)
- Leptotrachelus dilaticollis Bates, 1883 (Guatemala)
- Leptotrachelus dorsalis (Fabricius, 1801) (North America)
- Leptotrachelus fulvicollis Reiche, 1842 (Colombia)
- Leptotrachelus fulvus Motschulsky, 1864 (Panama)
- Leptotrachelus fuscus Liebke, 1939 (Brazil)
- Leptotrachelus humeralis Liebke, 1928 (Paraguay)
- Leptotrachelus labrosus Liebke, 1928 (Brazil)
- Leptotrachelus laevigula Liebke, 1928 (Brazil)
- Leptotrachelus marginatus Brullé, 1834 (Brazil)
- Leptotrachelus mexicanus (Chaudoir, 1852) (Mexico, Central and South America)
- Leptotrachelus nigriceps Chaudoir, 1872 (Brazil)
- Leptotrachelus nigripennis Liebke, 1928 (Surinam)
- Leptotrachelus pallens Motschulsky, 1864
- Leptotrachelus pallidipennis Chaudoir, 1872 (Brazil)
- Leptotrachelus pallidulus Motschulsky, 1864 (North America)
- Leptotrachelus parallelus Liebke, 1928 (Argentina)
- Leptotrachelus parcepunctatus Liebke, 1928 (Brazil)
- Leptotrachelus planicollis (Chaudoir, 1848) (Brazil)
- Leptotrachelus planus Motschulsky, 1864 (Panama)
- Leptotrachelus plaumanni Liebke, 1938 (Brazil)
- Leptotrachelus punctaticeps Chaudoir, 1872 (Brazil)
- Leptotrachelus puncticollis Bates, 1878 (Central and South America)
- Leptotrachelus riedelii (Eschscholtz, 1829) (Brazil)
- Leptotrachelus setulosus Liebke, 1928 (Brazil)
- Leptotrachelus striatopunctatus Chaudoir, 1872 (Brazil)
- Leptotrachelus suturalis Laporte, 1832 (Central and South America)
- Leptotrachelus testaceus Dejean, 1831 (Mexico, Central and South America)
