= Propionycha =

Scientific classification
- Domain: Eukaryota
- Kingdom: Animalia
- Phylum: Arthropoda
- Class: Insecta
- Order: Coleoptera
- Suborder: Adephaga
- Family: Carabidae
- Subfamily: Ctenodactylinae
- Tribe: Ctenodactylini
- Genus: Propionycha; Liebke, 1928

Genus of beetles

Propionycha is a genus in the ground beetle family Carabidae. There are at least two described species in Propionycha, found in Argentina.

== Species ==
These two species belong to the genus Propionycha:

- Propionycha argentinica Liebke, 1928
- Propionycha bruchi Liebke, 1928
