= Dinopelma =

Scientific classification
- Domain: Eukaryota
- Kingdom: Animalia
- Phylum: Arthropoda
- Class: Insecta
- Order: Coleoptera
- Suborder: Adephaga
- Family: Carabidae
- Subfamily: Ctenodactylinae
- Tribe: Hexagoniini
- Genus: Dinopelma; Bates, 1889

Genus of beetles

Dinopelma is a genus of ground beetles in the family Carabidae. There are about 13 described species in Dinopelma.

== Species ==
These 13 species belong to the genus Dinopelma:

- Dinopelma angustum Andrewes, 1931 (Borneo and Indonesia)
- Dinopelma bouchardi (Pouillaude, 1914) (Borneo, India, Indonesia, and Myanmar)
- Dinopelma immaculatum Andrewes, 1932 (Borneo and Indonesia)
- Dinopelma intermedium Louwerens, 1958 (Borneo and Indonesia)
- Dinopelma leptaleum Andrewes, 1932 (Myanmar and Thailand)
- Dinopelma lineola Andrewes, 1932 (Borneo, Indonesia, and Philippines)
- Dinopelma lunifer Andrewes, 1932 (Malaysia)
- Dinopelma marginatum Andrewes, 1932 (Philippines)
- Dinopelma minus Liebke, 1931 (Borneo and Indonesia)
- Dinopelma plantigradum Bates, 1889 (Borneo and Indonesia)
- Dinopelma quadratum Andrewes, 1931 (Borneo and Indonesia)
- Dinopelma virens (Andrewes, 1929) (Indonesia)
- Dinopelma wegneri Louwerens, 1958 (Borneo and Indonesia)
