= Pseudometabletus =

Pseudometabletus nevermanni

Scientific classification
- Kingdom: Animalia
- Phylum: Arthropoda
- Class: Insecta
- Order: Coleoptera
- Suborder: Adephaga
- Family: Carabidae
- Subfamily: Ctenodactylinae
- Genus: Pseudometabletus; Liebke, 1930
- Species: P. nevermanni

Binomial name
- Pseudometabletus nevermanni Liebke, 1930

Genus of beetles

Pseudometabletus nevermanni is a species of beetle in the family Carabidae, the only species in the genus Pseudometabletus.
