= Wate =

Scientific classification
- Kingdom: Animalia
- Phylum: Arthropoda
- Clade: Pancrustacea
- Class: Insecta
- Order: Coleoptera
- Suborder: Adephaga
- Family: Carabidae
- Subfamily: Ctenodactylinae
- Tribe: Ctenodactylini
- Genus: Wate; Liebke, 1928
- Species: W. smallinus

Binomial name
- Wate smallinus Liebke, 1928

Genus of beetles

Wate longinus is a species of beetle in the family Carabidae, the only species in the genus Wate. It is found in Brazil
