= Leptotrachelus depressus =

Scientific classification
- Domain: Eukaryota
- Kingdom: Animalia
- Phylum: Arthropoda
- Class: Insecta
- Order: Coleoptera
- Suborder: Adephaga
- Family: Carabidae
- Genus: Leptotrachelus
- Species: L. depressus

Binomial name
- Leptotrachelus depressus Blatchley, 1923

Species of beetle

Leptotrachelus depressus is a species of ground beetle in the family Carabidae. It is found in North America.
