= Omphreoides =

Scientific classification
- Kingdom: Animalia
- Phylum: Arthropoda
- Class: Insecta
- Order: Coleoptera
- Suborder: Adephaga
- Family: Carabidae
- Subfamily: Ctenodactylinae
- Tribe: Hexagoniini
- Genus: Omphreoides; Fairmaire, 1896

Genus of beetles

Omphreoides is a genus of ground beetles in the family Carabidae. There are about six described species in Omphreoides, found in Madagascar.

== Species ==
These six species belong to the genus Omphreoides:

- Omphreoides bispinus Fairmaire, 1896
- Omphreoides bucculentus Alluaud, 1899
- Omphreoides distinctus Alluaud, 1936
- Omphreoides furcatus Alluaud, 1897
- Omphreoides quodi Alluaud, 1910
- Omphreoides ranomafanae Kavanaugh & Rainio, 2016
