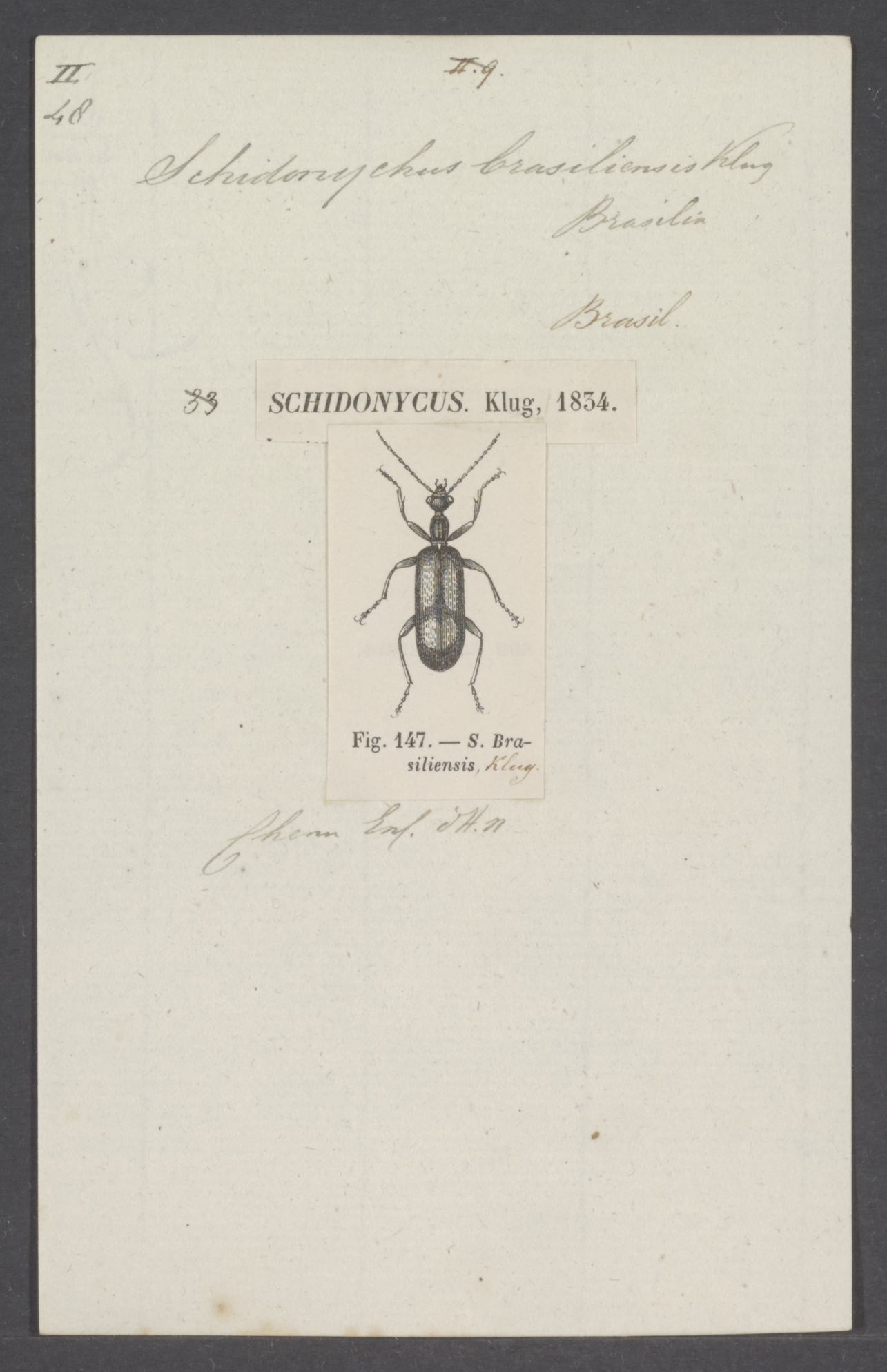

Scientific classification
- Domain: Eukaryota
- Kingdom: Animalia
- Phylum: Arthropoda
- Class: Insecta
- Order: Coleoptera
- Suborder: Adephaga
- Family: Carabidae
- Subfamily: Ctenodactylinae
- Tribe: Ctenodactylini
- Genus: Schidonychus; Klug, 1834
- Species: S. brasiliensis

Binomial name
- Schidonychus brasiliensis Klug, 1834

Synonyms
- Schidonycha Chaudoir, 1848; Schidonycus Desmarest, 1851-22

= Schidonychus =

Genus of beetles

Schidonychus is a genus in the ground beetle family Carabidae. This genus has a single species, Schidonychus brasiliensis. It is found in Argentina and Brazil.
