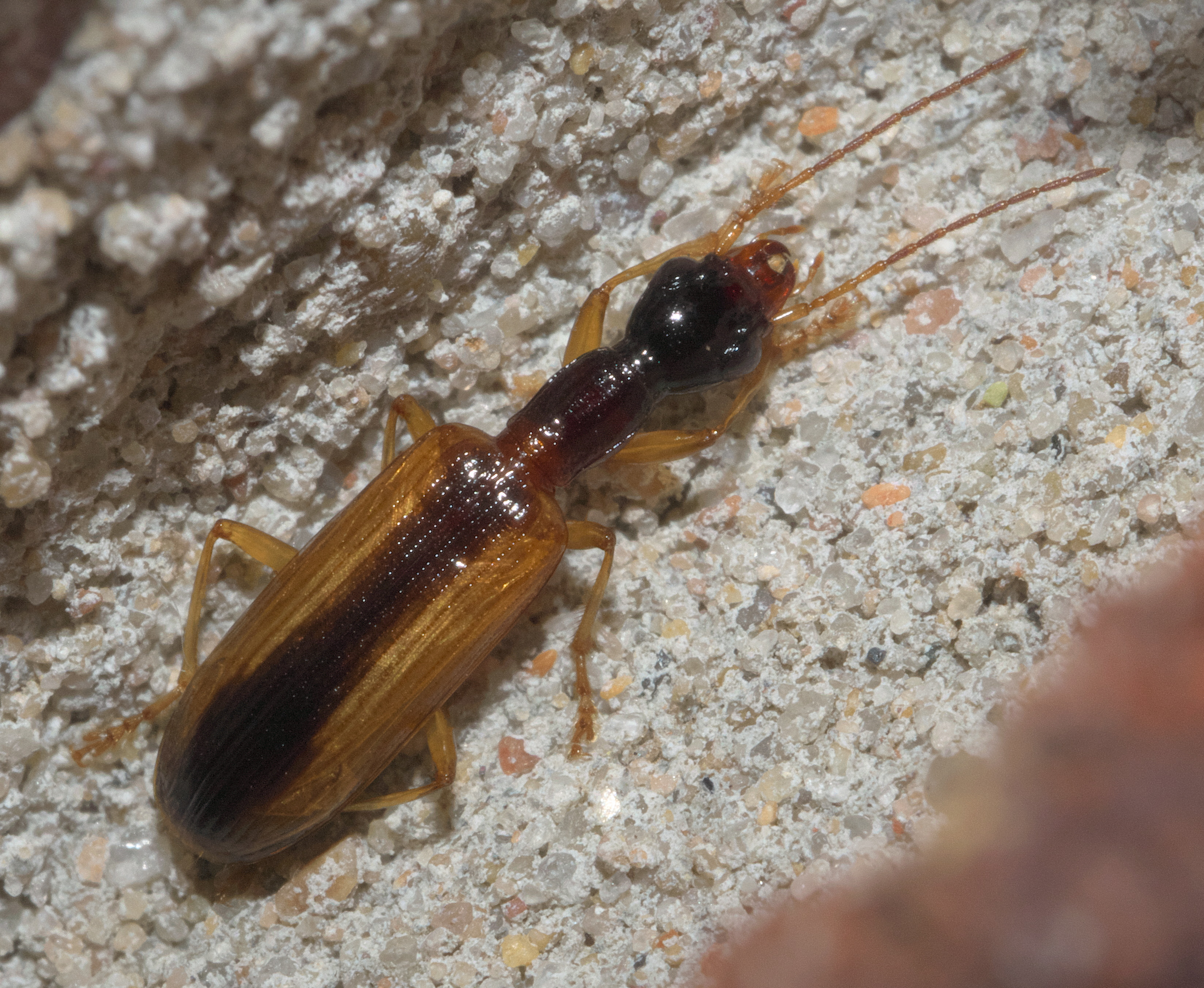

Scientific classification
- Domain: Eukaryota
- Kingdom: Animalia
- Phylum: Arthropoda
- Class: Insecta
- Order: Coleoptera
- Suborder: Adephaga
- Family: Carabidae
- Genus: Leptotrachelus
- Species: L. dorsalis

Binomial name
- Leptotrachelus dorsalis (Fabricius, 1801)

= Leptotrachelus dorsalis =

Species of beetle

Leptotrachelus dorsalis is a species of ground beetle in the family Carabidae. It is found in North America. It is a predator of Diatraea saccharalis eggs and larvae.

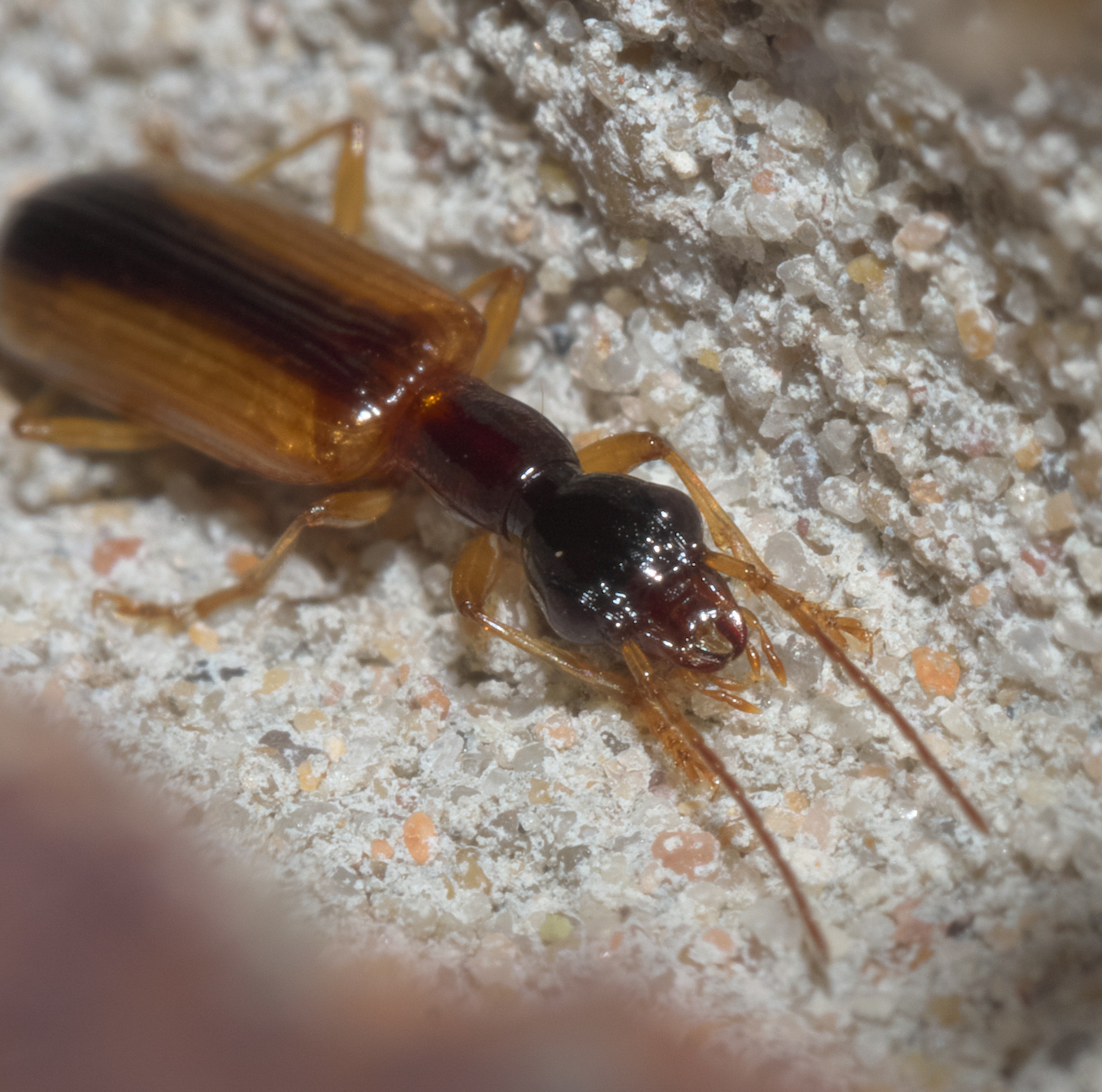
