= Oilea =

Scientific classification
- Domain: Eukaryota
- Kingdom: Animalia
- Phylum: Arthropoda
- Class: Insecta
- Order: Coleoptera
- Suborder: Adephaga
- Family: Carabidae
- Tribe: Ctenodactylini
- Genus: Oilea; Liebke, 1931
- Species: O. spinalis

Binomial name
- Oilea spinalis Liebke, 1931

Genus of beetles

Oilea is a genus in the ground beetle family Carabidae. This genus has a single species, Oilea spinalis. It is found in Brazil.
