= Leptotrachelon =

Scientific classification
- Domain: Eukaryota
- Kingdom: Animalia
- Phylum: Arthropoda
- Class: Insecta
- Order: Coleoptera
- Suborder: Adephaga
- Family: Carabidae
- Tribe: Ctenodactylini
- Genus: Leptotrachelon; Liebke, 1928
- Species: L. nevermanni

Binomial name
- Leptotrachelon nevermanni Liebke, 1928

Genus of beetles

Leptotrachelon is a genus in the ground beetle family Carabidae. This genus has a single species, Leptotrachelon nevermanni. It is found in Costa Rica.
