= Hexagonia (beetle) =

Scientific classification
- Domain: Eukaryota
- Kingdom: Animalia
- Phylum: Arthropoda
- Class: Insecta
- Order: Coleoptera
- Suborder: Adephaga
- Family: Carabidae
- Subfamily: Ctenodactylinae
- Tribe: Hexagoniini
- Genus: Hexagonia; Kirby, 1825

Genus of beetles

Hexagonia is a genus of ground beetles in the family Carabidae. There are more than 40 described species in Hexagonia, found in Asia and Africa.

== Species ==
These 48 species belong to the genus Hexagonia:

- Hexagonia andrewesi Jedlicka, 1935 (Philippines)
- Hexagonia angustula Péringuey, 1904 (Africa)
- Hexagonia apicalis Schmidt-Goebel, 1846 (India and Myanmar)
- Hexagonia bencoulensis Pouillaude, 1914 (Indonesia)
- Hexagonia bicolor Mateu, 1958 (Madagascar)
- Hexagonia bilyi Baehr, 2012 (Australia)
- Hexagonia bowringii Schaum, 1863 (Malaysia)
- Hexagonia brazzai Alluaud, 1931 (Congo (Brazzaville))
- Hexagonia castanea Jedlicka, 1936 (Philippines)
- Hexagonia caurina Andrewes, 1935 (India, Laos, and Myanmar)
- Hexagonia cephalotes (Dejean, 1826) (India)
- Hexagonia collarti Basilewsky, 1948 (Weest Africa)
- Hexagonia concolor Mateu, 1958 (Madagascar)
- Hexagonia cyclops (Matsumura, 1911) (Japan, Taiwan, and temperate Asia)
- Hexagonia dohrni Andrewes, 1930 (Indonesia and Malaysia)
- Hexagonia elongata Dupuis, 1913 (Taiwan and temperate Asia)
- Hexagonia eucharis Alluaud, 1932 (the Democratic Republic of the Congo)
- Hexagonia fleutiauxi Dupuis, 1913 (Indomalaya)
- Hexagonia gracilis Pouillaude, 1914 (Indonesia)
- Hexagonia gressitti Darlington, 1971 (Indonesia and New Guinea)
- Hexagonia guineensis Alluaud, 1931 (West Africa)
- Hexagonia immaculata (Chaudoir, 1861) (South Africa and Tanzania)
- Hexagonia insignis (Bates, 1883) (East Asia)
- Hexagonia klapperichi Jedlicka, 1953 (China)
- Hexagonia longithorax (Wiedemann, 1823) (Bangladesh, India, and Myanmar)
- Hexagonia lucasseni van de Poll, 1889 (Indonesia)
- Hexagonia major Burgeon, 1937 (Africa)
- Hexagonia natalensis (Chaudoir, 1861) (Africa)
- Hexagonia nigrita van de Poll, 1889 (Asia)
- Hexagonia palauensis Darlington, 1970 (Indonesia)
- Hexagonia pallida Chaudoir, 1878 (Africa)
- Hexagonia papua Darlington, 1968 (New Guinea)
- Hexagonia praeusta (Chaudoir, 1861) (South Africa)
- Hexagonia punctatostriata (LaFerté-Sénectère, 1849) (Africa)
- Hexagonia queenslandica Baehr, 2012 (Australia)
- Hexagonia sauteri Dupuis, 1912 (Japan, Taiwan, and temperate Asia)
- Hexagonia scabricollis (Klug, 1834) (Africa)
- Hexagonia seyrigi Jeannel, 1948 (Madagascar)
- Hexagonia spinigera Andrewes, 1941 (Indonesia)
- Hexagonia stenodes Andrewes, 1935 (Bangladesh and India)
- Hexagonia terminalis Gemminger & Harold, 1868 (Africa)
- Hexagonia terminata Kirby, 1825 (Indomalaya)
- Hexagonia treichi Alluaud, 1925 (Guinea and Ivory Coast)
- Hexagonia umtalina Péringuey, 1904 (Zimbabwe)
- Hexagonia uninotata Andrewes, 1935 (India)
- Hexagonia venusta Péringuey, 1904 (West Africa)
- Hexagonia watanabei Morita & Toyoda, 2002 (Japan)
- Hexagonia zumpti Liebke, 1939 (Cameroon)
