= Parapionycha =

Scientific classification
- Domain: Eukaryota
- Kingdom: Animalia
- Phylum: Arthropoda
- Class: Insecta
- Order: Coleoptera
- Suborder: Adephaga
- Family: Carabidae
- Tribe: Ctenodactylini
- Genus: Parapionycha; Liebke, 1929
- Species: P. lizeri

Binomial name
- Parapionycha lizeri Liebke, 1929

Genus of beetles

Parapionycha is a genus in the ground beetle family Carabidae. This genus has a single species, Parapionycha lizeri. It is found in Bolivia.
