= Askalaphium =

Scientific classification
- Domain: Eukaryota
- Kingdom: Animalia
- Phylum: Arthropoda
- Class: Insecta
- Order: Coleoptera
- Suborder: Adephaga
- Family: Carabidae
- Tribe: Ctenodactylini
- Genus: Askalaphium; Liebke, 1938
- Species: A. depressum

Binomial name
- Askalaphium depressum (Bates, 1871)

Synonyms
- Asakalaphium

Genus of beetles

Askalaphium is a genus of ground beetles in the family Carabidae. This genus has a single species, Askalaphium depressum. It is found in Brazil and Peru.
