= List of fauna of Utah =

This is a list of fauna observed in the U.S. state of Utah.

== Invertebrates ==
=== Arachnids ===
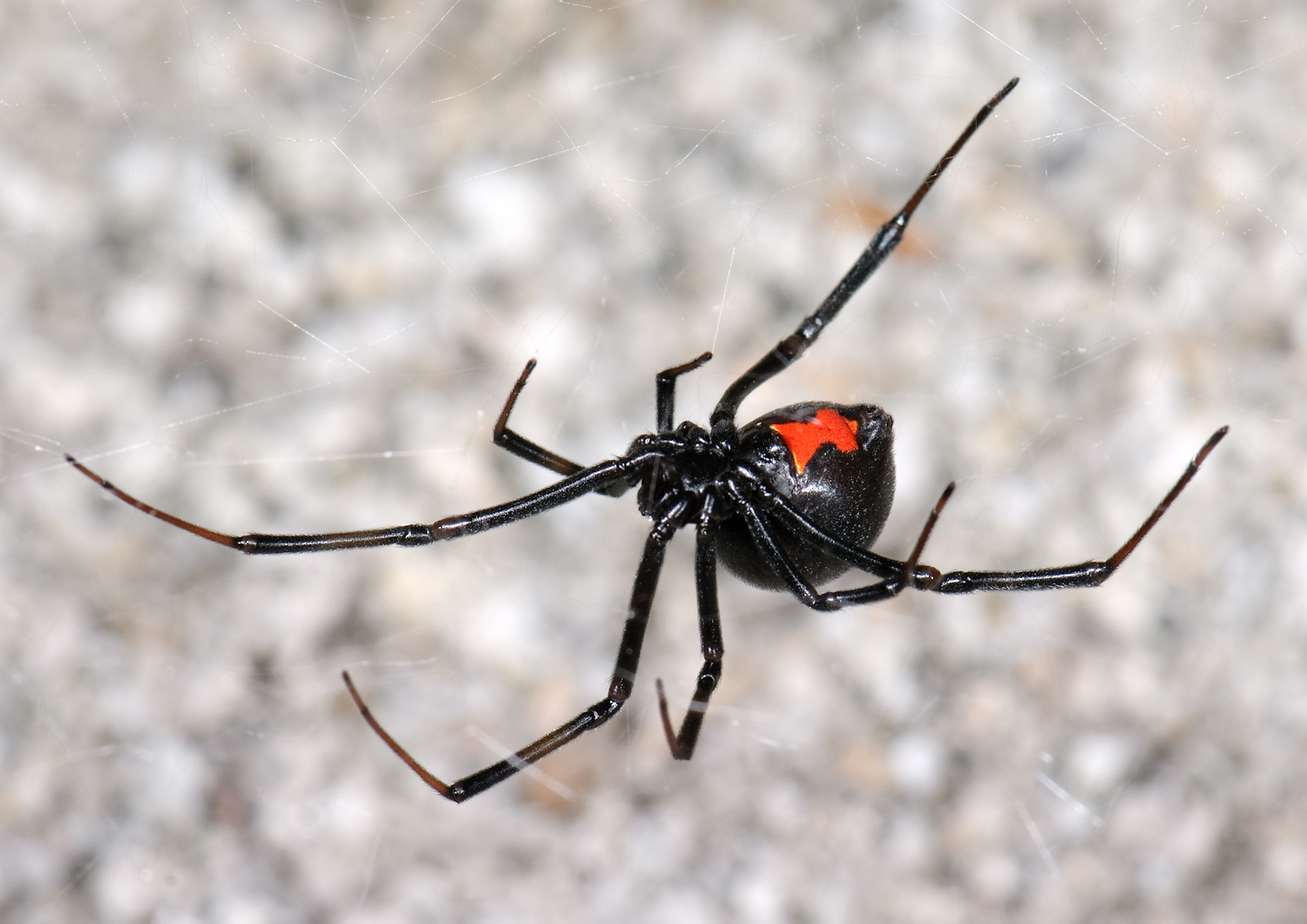
Western black widow spider

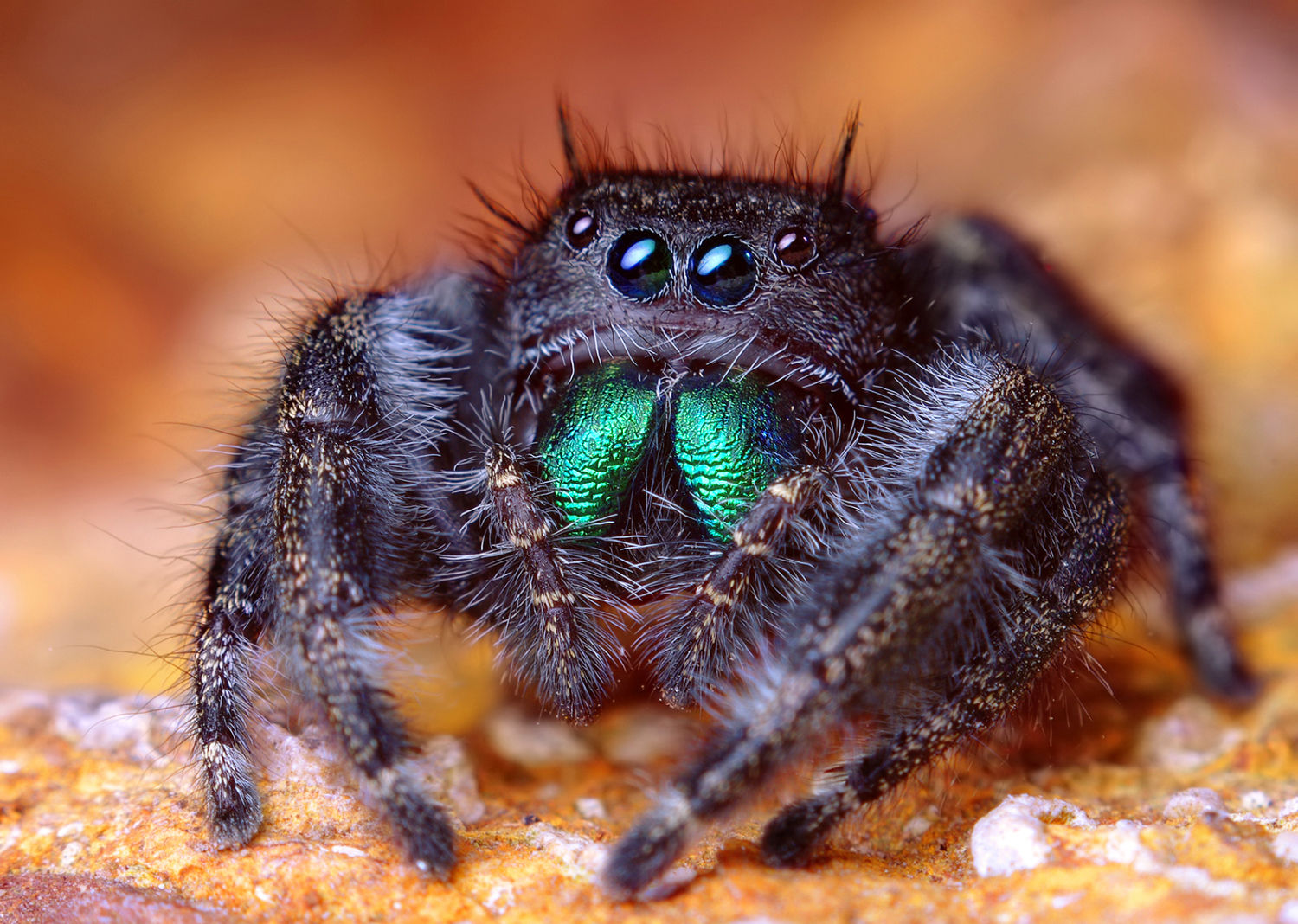
Bold jumping spider

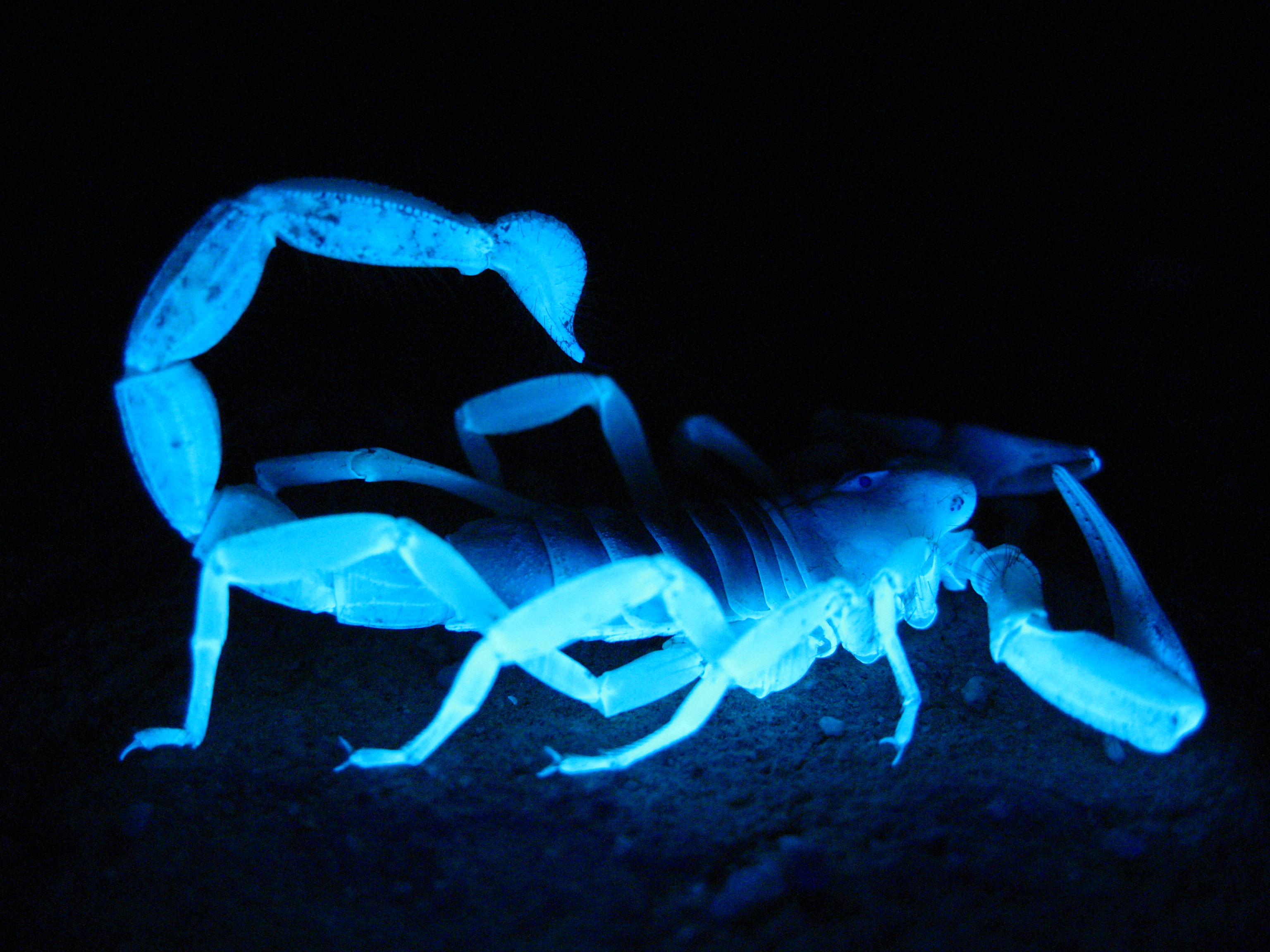
Giant hairy scorpion under UV light

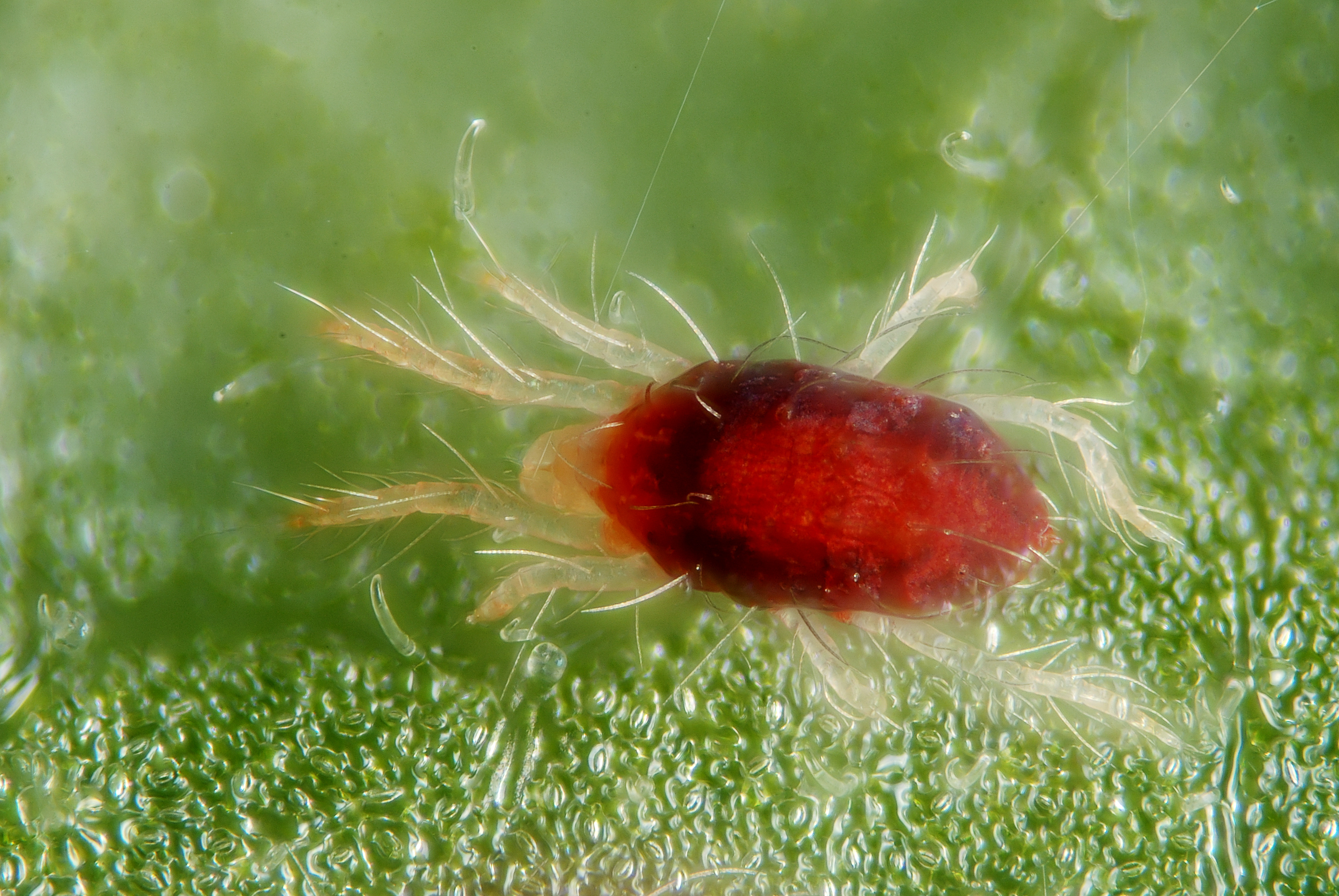
Red spider mite

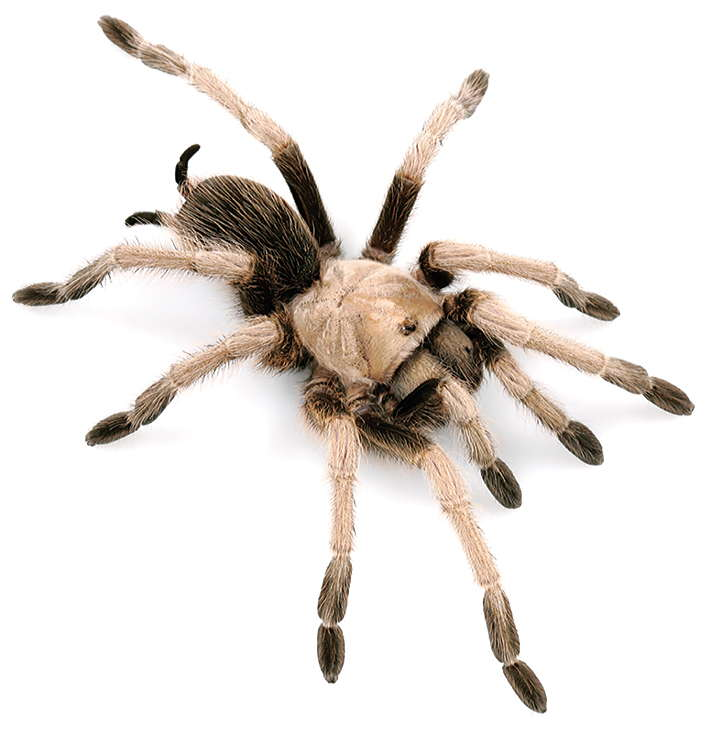
Salt Lake County brown tarantula

- American grass spider (Agelenopsis spp.)
- American yellow sac spider (Cheiracanthium inclusum)
- Ant spider (Micaria pasadena)
- Ant spider (Micaria rossica)
- Antmimic spider (Meriola decepta )
- Arizona bark scorpion (Centruroides exilicauda)
- Banded orb weaving spider (Argiope trifasciata)
- Bindweed gall mite (Aceria malherbae)
- Black hairy scorpion (Hadrurus spadix)
- Bold jumping spider (Phidippus audax)
- Camel spider (Eremobates spp.)
- Carolina wolf spider (Hogna carolinensis)
- Cat-faced spider (Araneus gemmoides)
- Cellar spiders (Pholcus phalangioides) - also called "daddy long-legs"
- Clover mite (Bryobia praetiosa)
- Crab spider (Bassaniana utahensis)
- Crab spider (Ebo pepinensis)
- Crab spider (Mecaphesa spp.)
- Crab spider (Xysticus discursans)
- Crab spider (Xysticus emertoni)
- Crab spider (Xysticus pellax )
- Eastern parson spider (Herpyllus ecclesiasticus)
- False black widow (Steatoda grossa)
- Flattened crab spider (Philodromus histrio)
- Flattened crab spider (Philodromus imbecillus)
- Flattened crab spider (Philodromus spectabilis)
- Giant desert hairy scorpion (Hadrurus arizonensis)
- Ground spider (Cesonia gertschi)
- Ground spider (Drassodes spp.)
- Ground spider (Drassyllus lepidus)
- Ground spider (Gnaphosa sericata)
- Ground spider (Herpyllus cockerelli)
- Hobo spider (Tegenaria agrestis)
- Huntsman spider (Olios giganteus)
- Jumping spider (Habronattus conjunctus)
- Jumping spider (Habronattus signatus)
- Jumping spider (Habronattus tarsalis)
- Jumping spider (Platycryptus arizonensis)
- Jumping spider (Salticus peckhamae)
- Northern scorpion (Paruroctonus boreus)
- Pseudoscorpion (various)
- Red spider mite (Tetranychus urticae) - also called "two-spotted spider mite"
- Rocky Mountain wood tick (Dermacentor andersoni)
- Sac spider (Phrurotimpus borealis)
- Salt Lake County brown tarantula (Aphonopelma iodius)
- Slender crab spider (Tibellus chamberlini)
- Slender crab spider (Tibellus duttoni)
- Soft-bodied tick (Ornithodoros spp.) - suspected due to confirmation in all surrounding states, not confirmed in Utah
- Spinose ear tick (Otobius megnini)
- Spruce spider mite (Oligonychus ununguis)
- Striped lynx spider (Oxyopes scalaris)
- Tomato russet mite (Aculops lycopersici)
- Utah crevice weaver (Kukulcania utahana)
- Western black widow spider (Latrodectus hesperus)
- White-banded crab spider (Misumenoides formosipes)
- Wolf spider (Hogna spp.)
- Woodlouse spider (Dysdera crocata)

=== Crustaceans ===
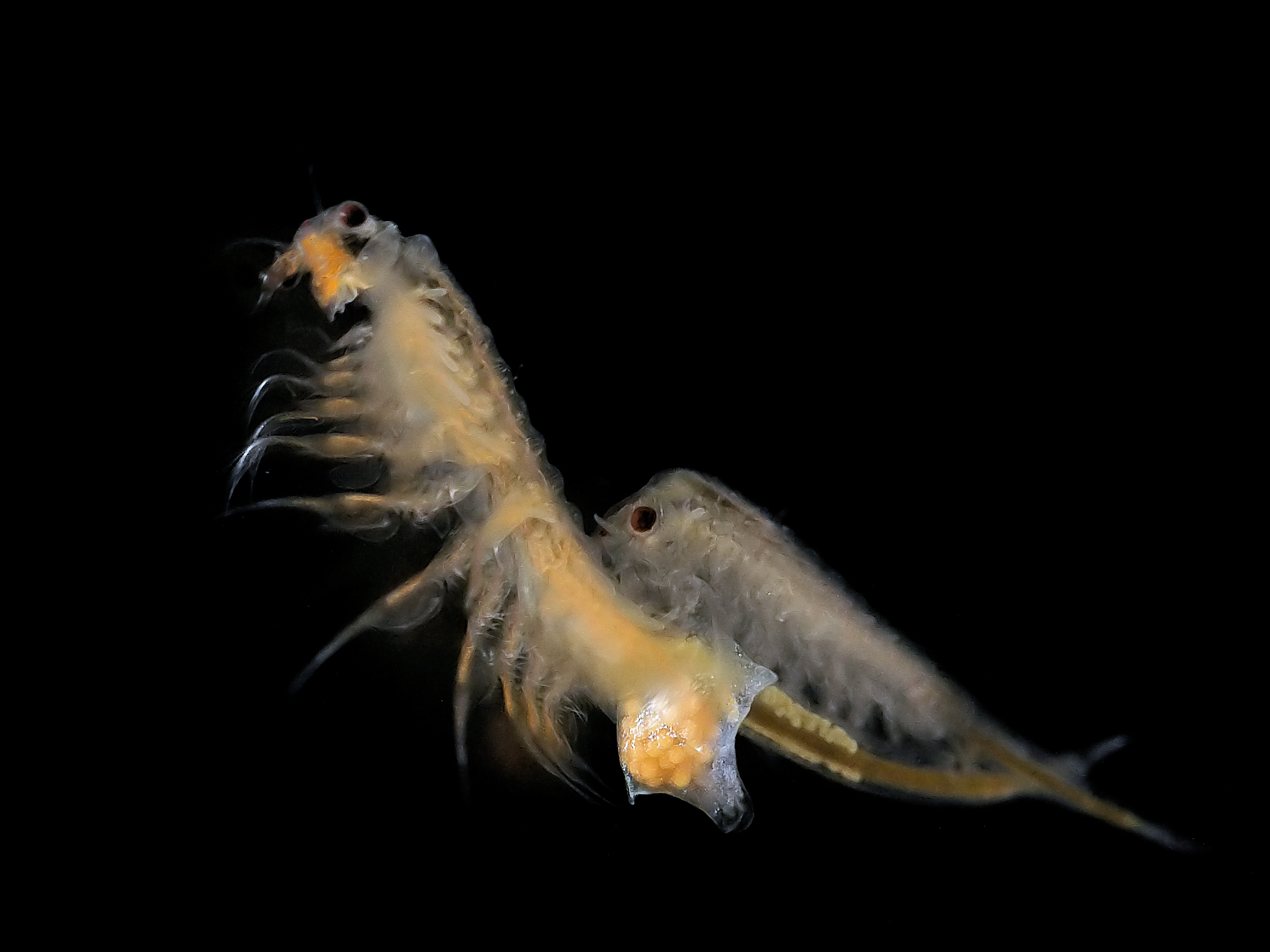
Brine shrimp

- Brine shrimp (Artemia franciscana)
- Louisiana crayfish (Procambarus clarkii) - not native and considered invasive
- Northern crayfish (Orconectes virilis) - not native and considered invasive
- Pill bug (Armadillidium vulgare) - sometimes called "sow bugs"
- Pilose crayfish (Pacifastacus gambelii)
- Signal crayfish (Pacifastacus leniusculus) - confirmed in Utah County
- Snake River Pilose crayfish (Pacifastacus leniusculus) - likely but not confirmed as of 2009
- Water flea (Daphnia lumholtzi) - not native and considered invasive

=== Insects ===
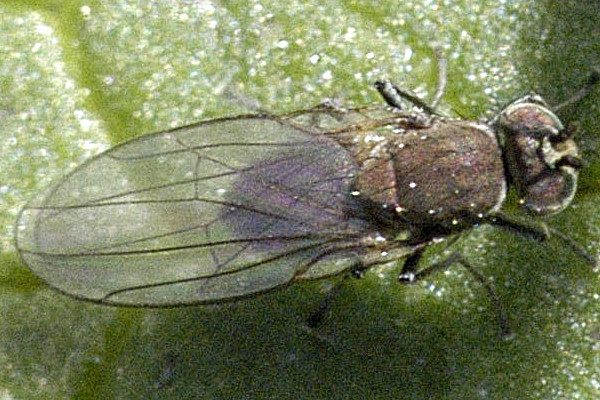
Brine fly

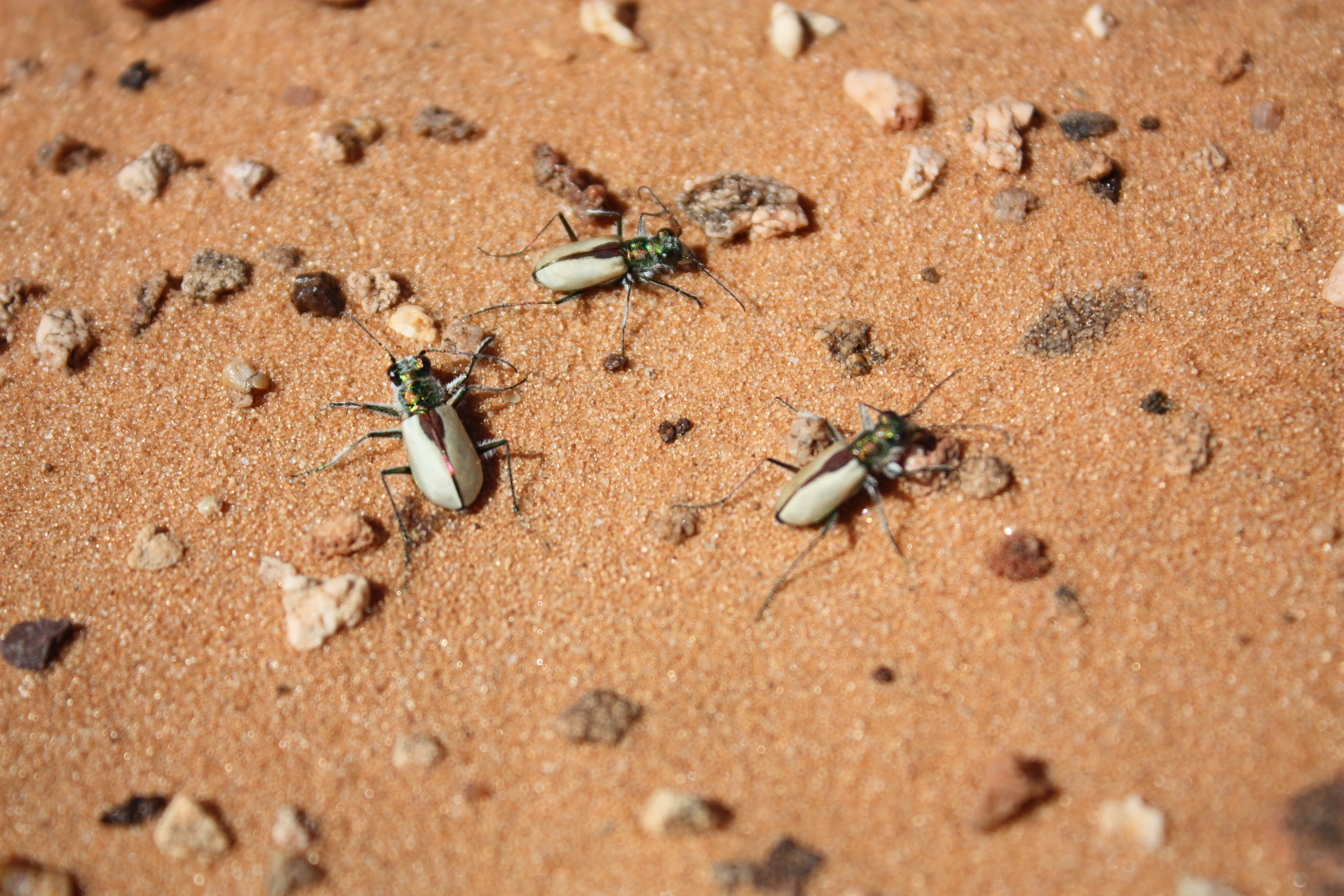
Coral Pink Sand Dunes tiger beetle

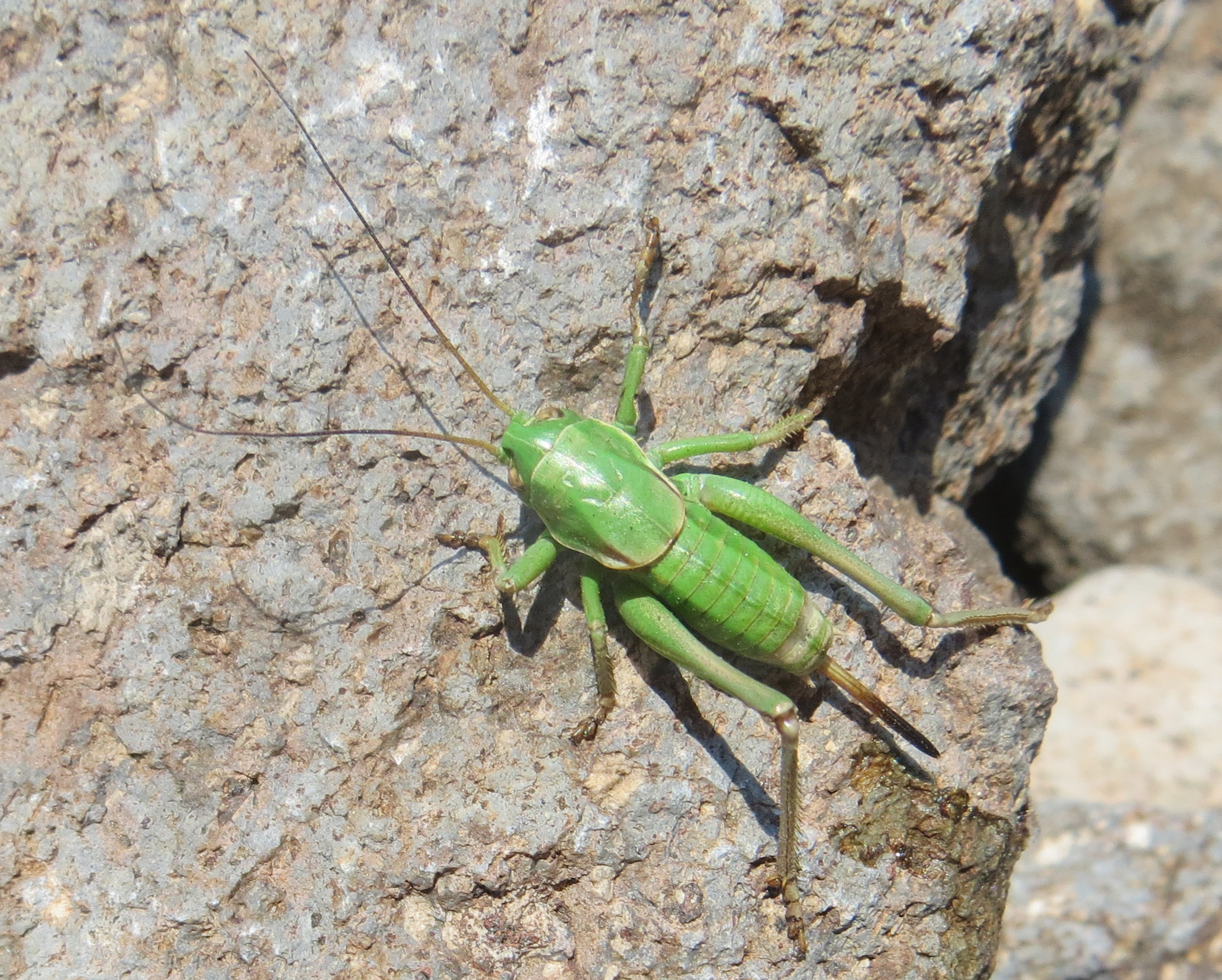
Mormon cricket

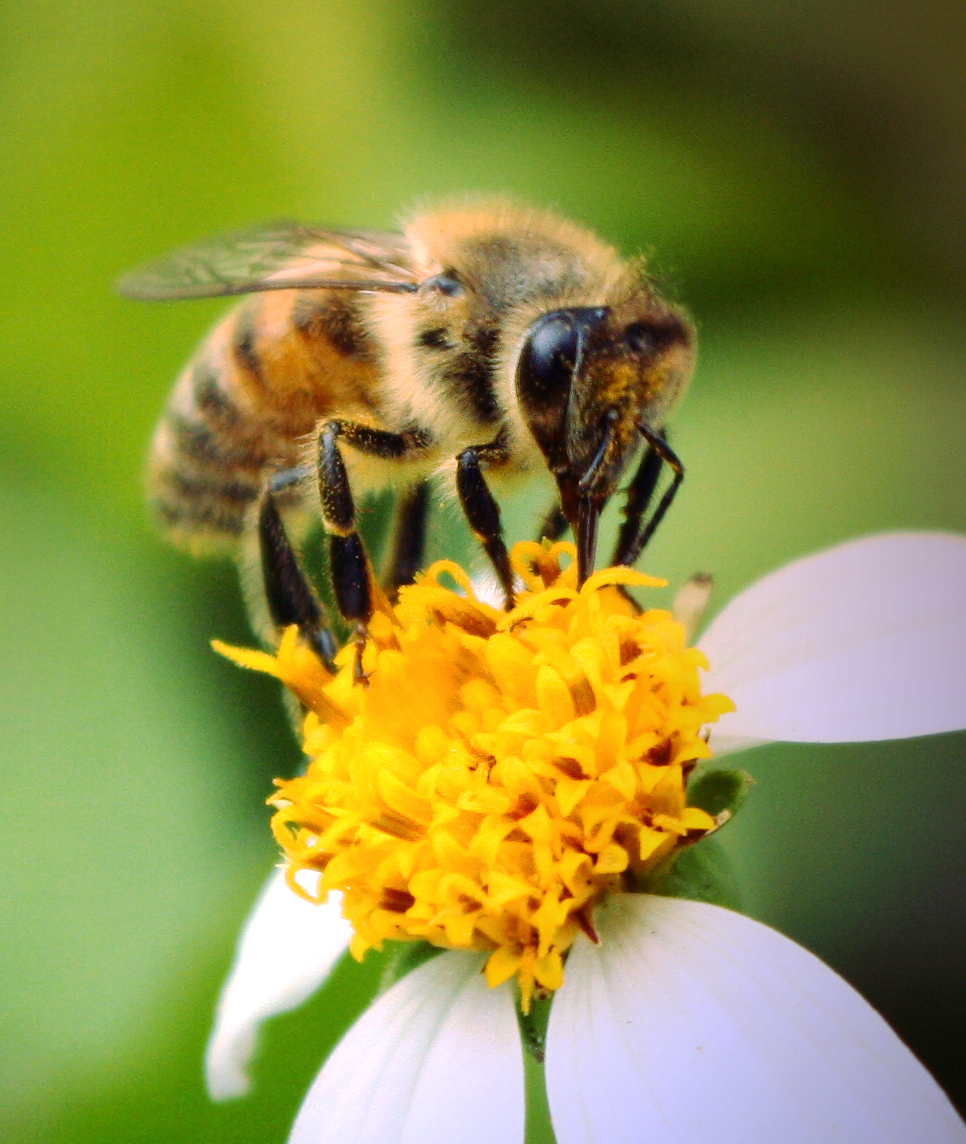
Western honey bee

- Alkali fly (Ephydra hians)
- American serpentine leafminer (Liriomyza trifolii)
- Bank's grass mite (Oligonychus pratensis)
- Beet leafhopper (Circulifer tenellus)
- Brine fly (Ephydra cinerea Jones)
- Brown marmorated stink bug (Halyomorpha halys) - considered invasive
- Cabbage aphid (Brevicoryne brassicae)
- Cabbage maggot (Delia radicum)
- Colorado potato beetle (Leptinotarsa decemlineata)
- Columbia Basin wireworm (Limonius subauratus)
- Common earwig (Forficula auricularia) - also called European earwig
- Coral Pink Sand Dunes tiger beetle (Cicindela albissima)
- Corn leaf aphid (Rhopalosiphum maidis)
- Corn sap beetle (Carpophilus dimidiatus)
- Differential grasshopper (Melanoplus differentialis)
- Dusky sap beetle (Carpophilus lugubris)
- Four-spotted sap beetle (Glischrochilus quadrisignatus) - also called picnic beetle
- Great Basin wireworm (Ctenicera pruinina)
- Green lacewing (Chrysopa)
- Green peach aphid (Myzus persicae)
- Green stink bug (Chinavia hilaris)
- Ichneumon wasp (Megarhyssa spp.)
- Jerusalem cricket (Stenopelmatus spp.)
- Melon aphid (Aphis gossypii)
- Migratory grasshopper (Melanoplus sanguinipes)
- Mormon cricket (Anabrus simplex)
- Northern corn rootworm (Diabrotica barberi)
- Onion fly (Delia antiqua)
- Onion thrips (Thrips tabaci)
- Pacific coast wireworm (Limonius canus)
- Potato aphid (Macrosiphum euphorbiae)
- Potato psyllid (Bactericera cockerelli)
- Red-legged grasshopper (Melanoplus femurrubrum)
- Seedcorn maggot (Delia platura)
- Spotted cucumber beetle (Diabrotica undecimpunctata)
- Striped cucumber beetle (Acalymma trivittatum)
- Thrips (various)
- Sugar beet wireworm (Limonius californicus)
- Two-striped grasshopper (Melanoplus bivittatus)
- Vegetable leafminer (Liriomyza sativae)
- Velvet ant (Mutillidae spp.) - these are actually a type of wasp
- Water boatmen (Corixidae)
- Western corn rootworm (Diabrotica virgifera)
- Western field wireworm (Limonius infuscatus)
- Western honey bee (Apis mellifera)

==== Butterflies and moths ====
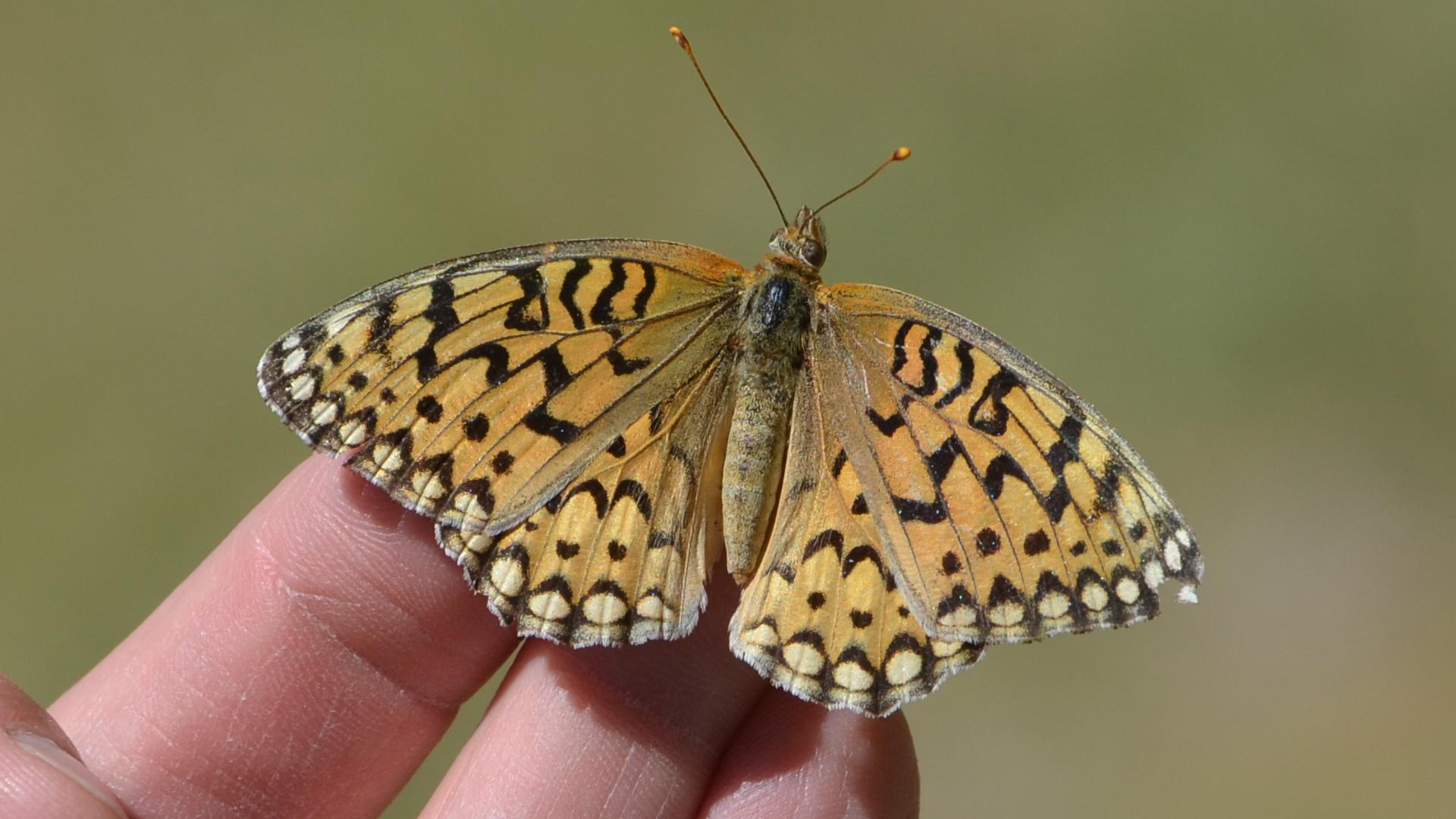
Callippe fritillary butterfly

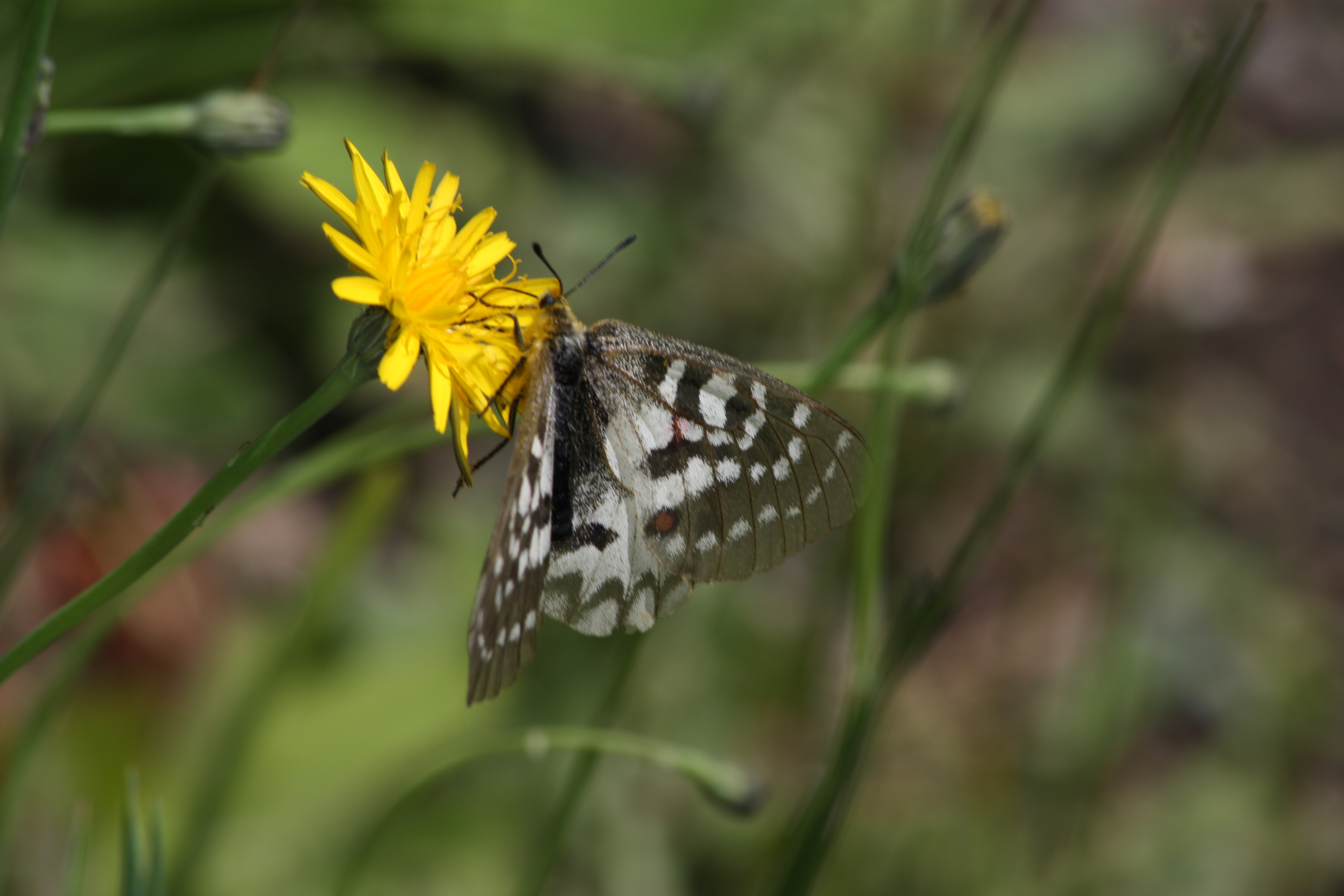
Clodius parnassian butterfly

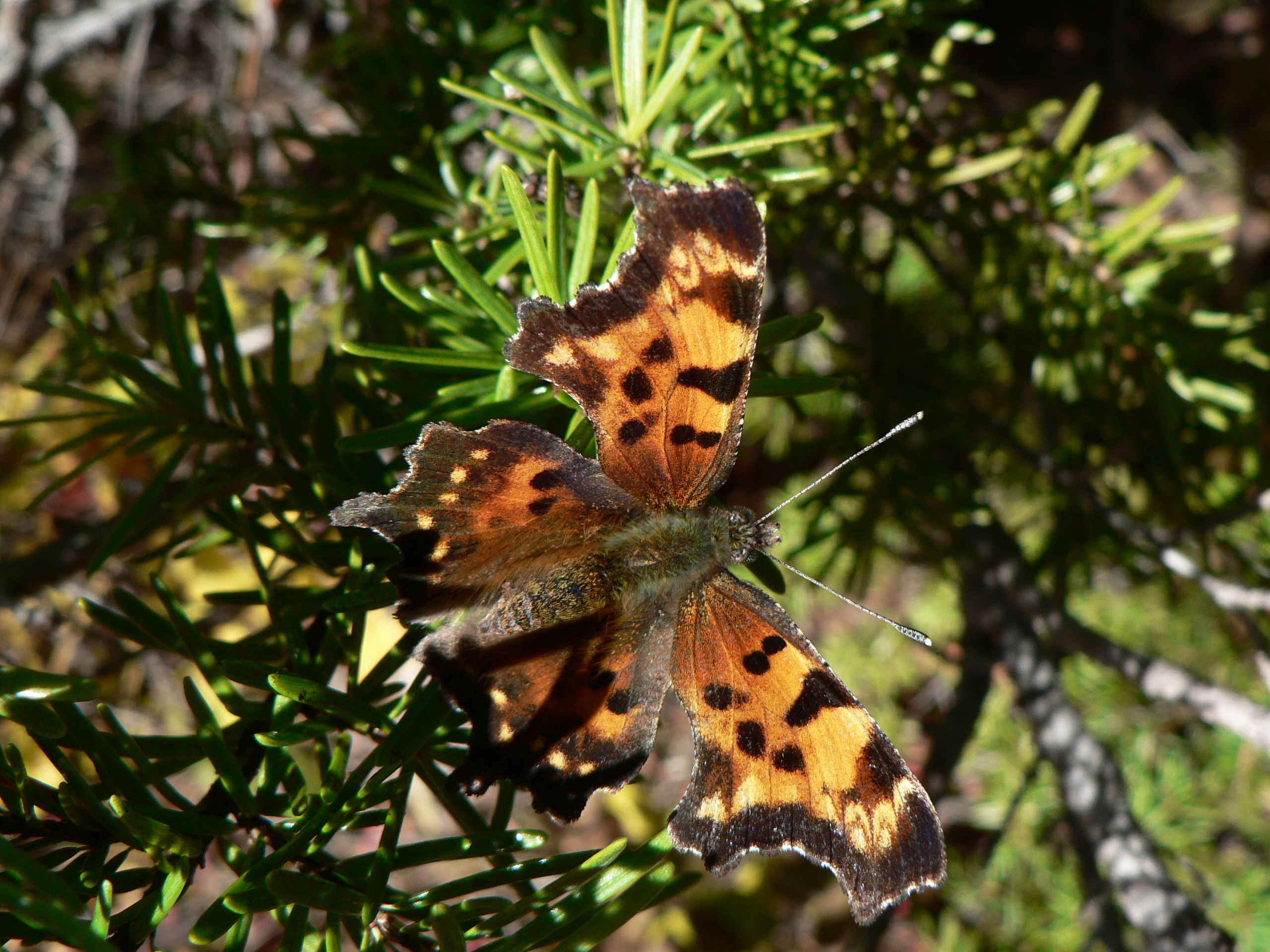
Green comma butterfly

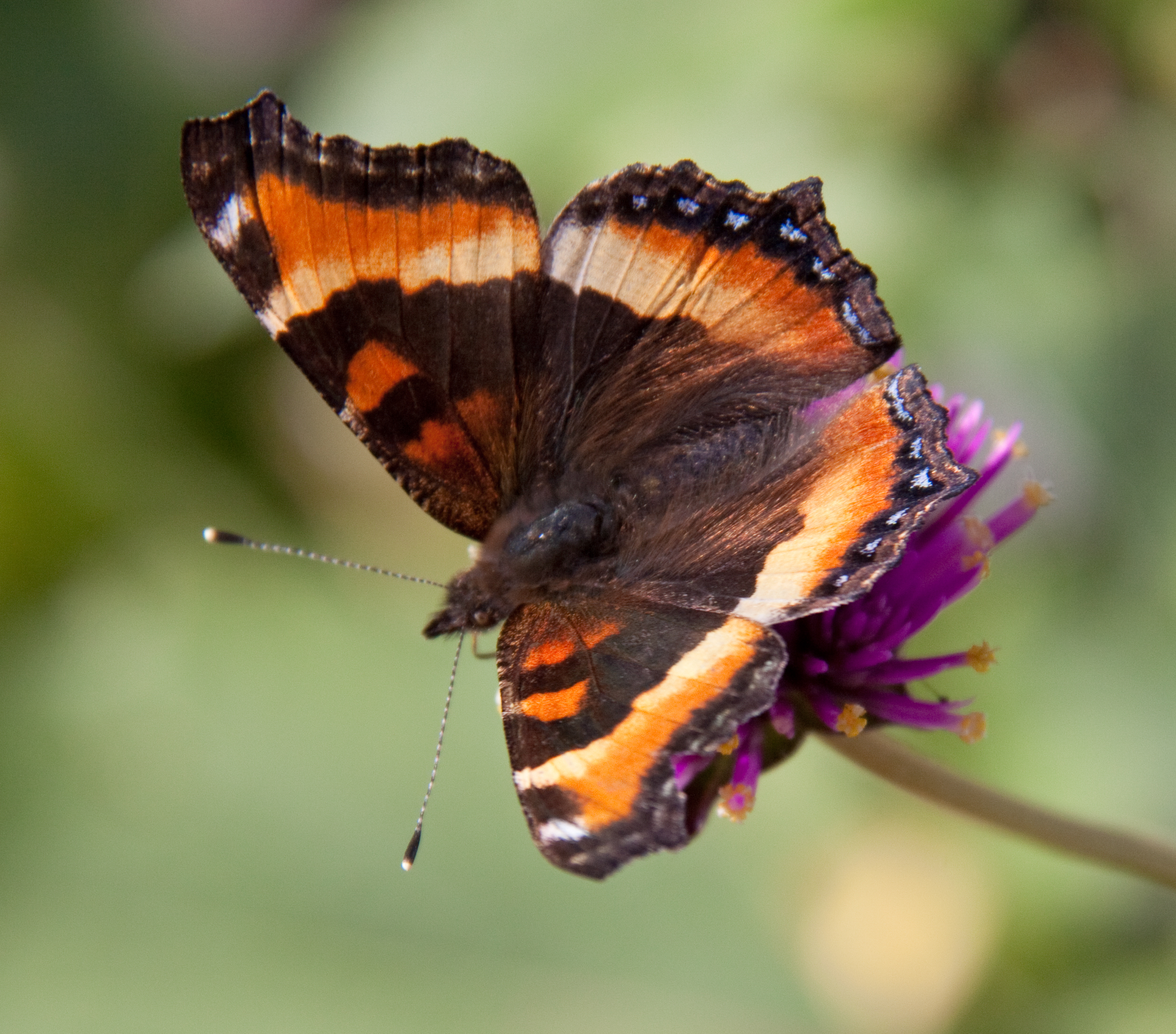
Milbert's tortoiseshell butterfly

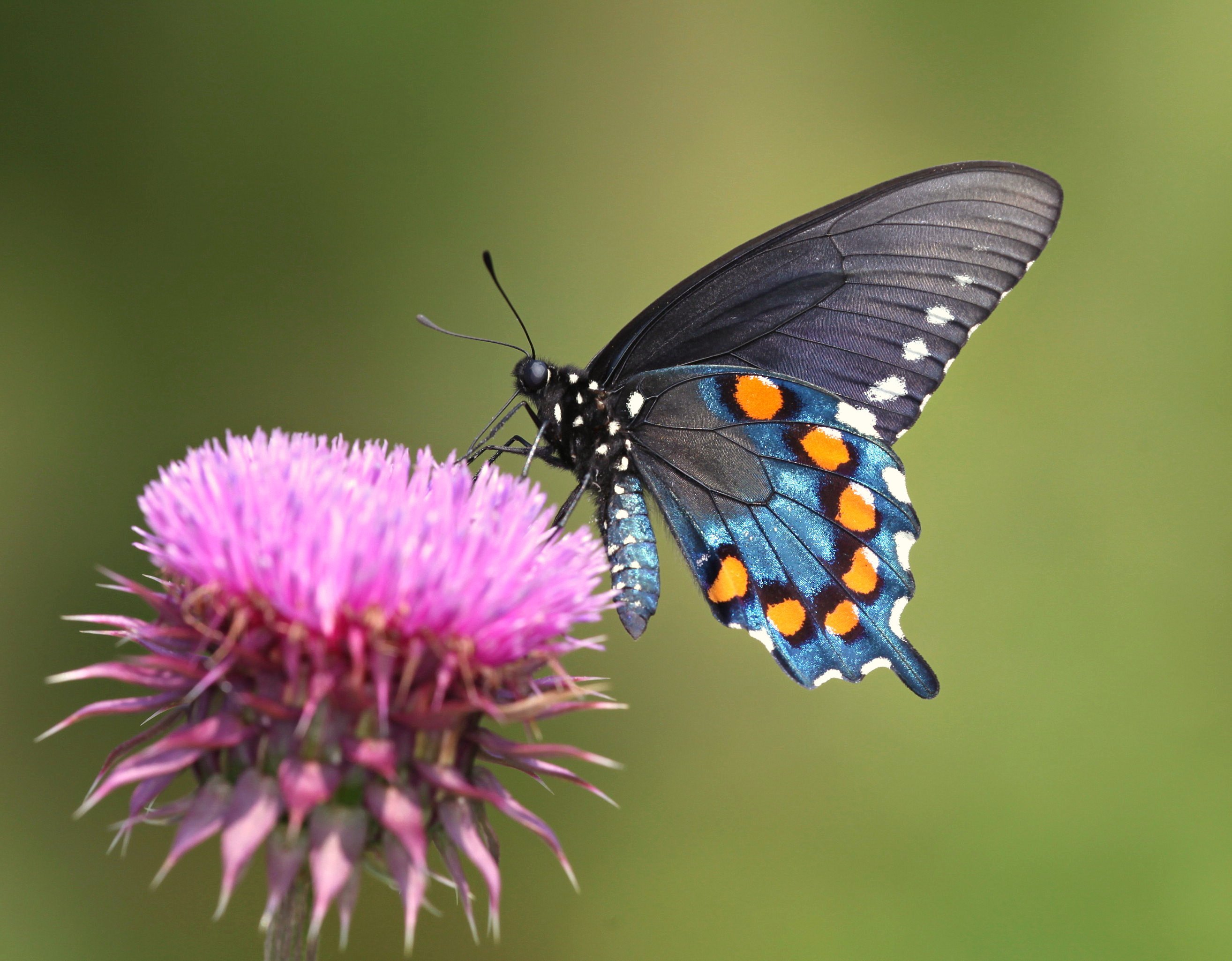
Pipevine swallowtail

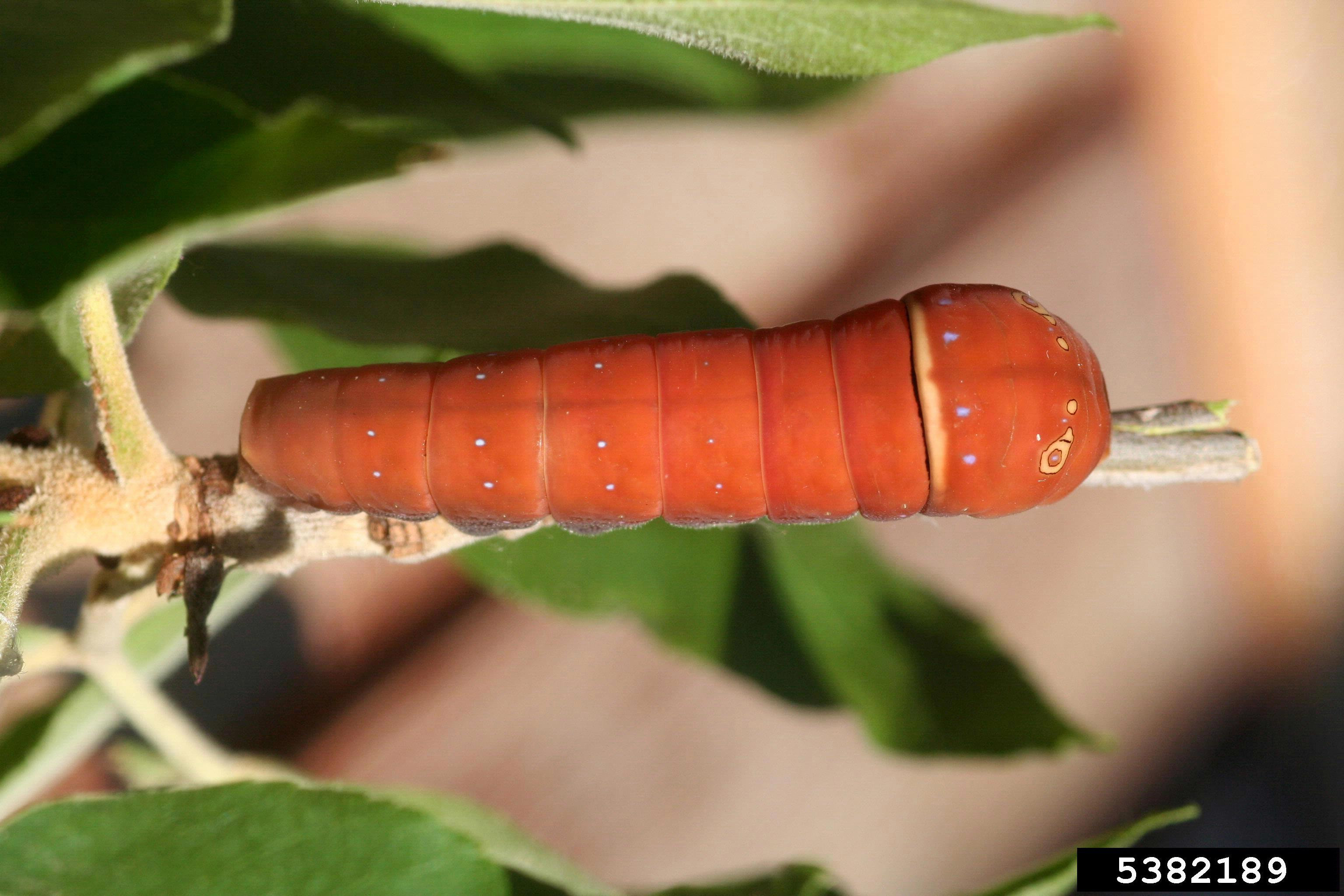
Caterpillar of two-tailed swallowtail

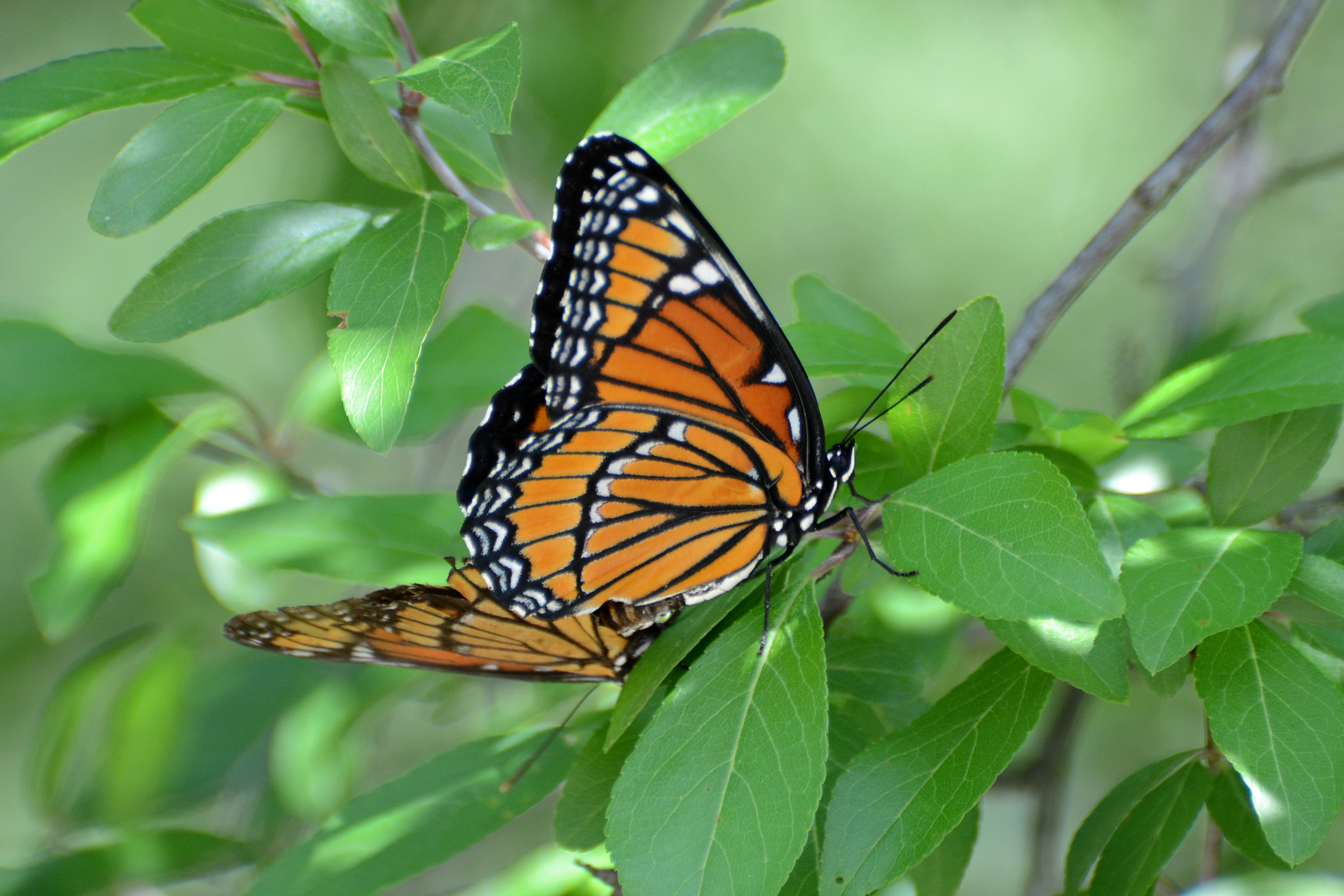
Viceroy butterfly mating pair

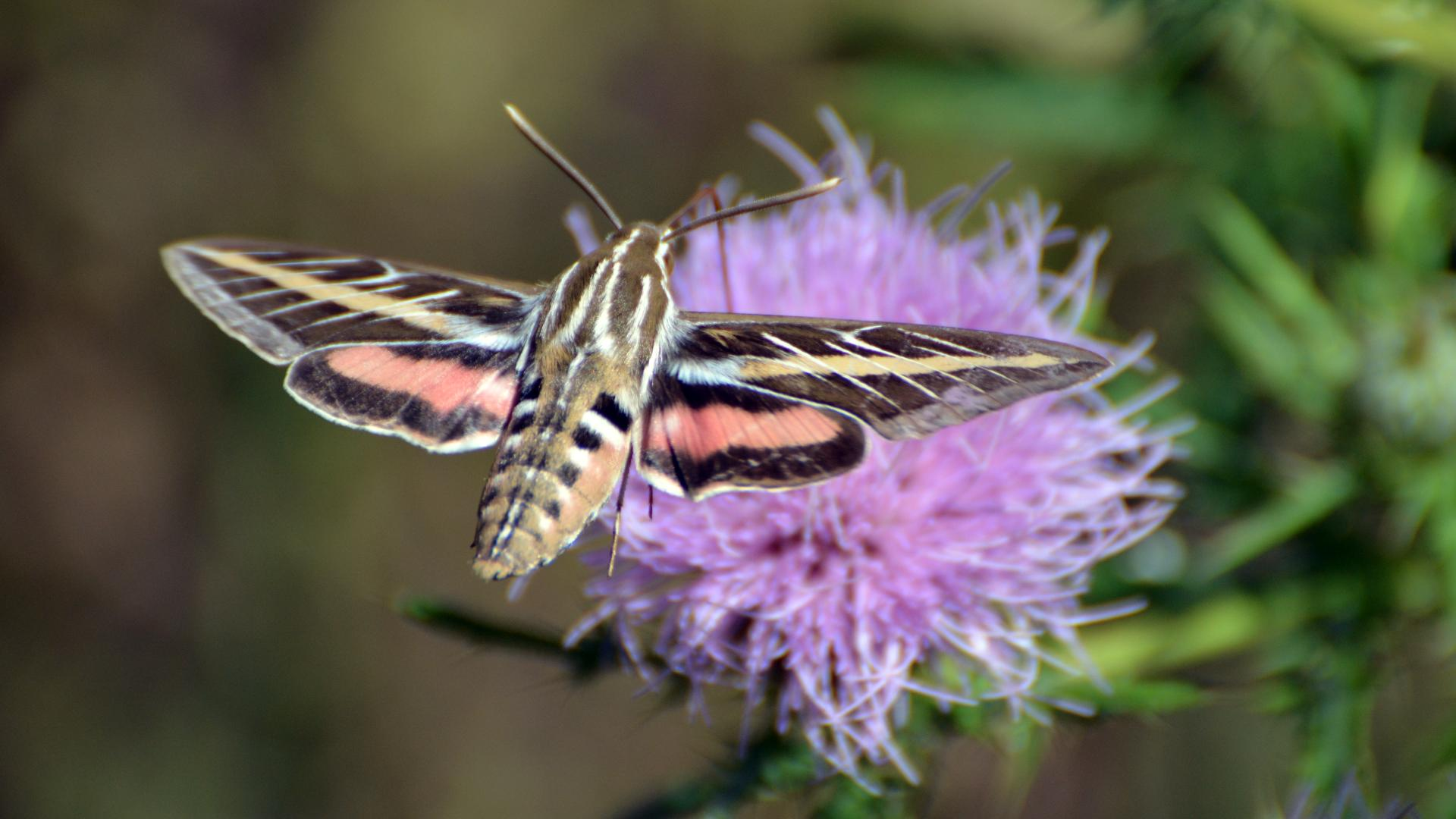
White-lined sphinx moth

- Achemon sphinx moth (Eumorpha achemon)
- American painted lady butterfly (Vanessa virginiensis)
- American snout butterfly (Libytheana carinenta)
- Anise swallowtail butterfly (Papilio zelicaon)
- Aphrodite fritillary butterfly (Speyeria aphrodite)
- Arctic fritillary butterfly (Boloria chariclea)
- Army cutworm (Euxoa auxiliaris)
- Black cutworm (Agrotis ipsilon)
- Black swallowtail butterfly (Papilio polyxenes)
- Bordered patch butterfly (Chlosyne lacinia)
- Cabbage looper (Trichoplusia ni)
- California patch butterfly (Chlosyne californica)
- California sister butterfly (Adelpha californica)
- California tortoiseshell butterfly (Nymphalis californica)
- Callippe fritillary butterfly (Speyeria callippe)
- Clodius parnassian butterfly (Parnassius clodius)
- Common buckeye butterfly (Junonia coenia)
- Compton tortoiseshell butterfly (Nymphalis vaualbum)
- Corn earworm (Helicoverpa zea) - also called the tomato fruitworm
- Coronis fritillary butterfly (Speyeria coronis)
- Diamondback moth (Plutella xylostella)
- Dotted checkerspot butterfly (Poladryas minuta)
- Edith's checkerspot butterfly (Euphydryas editha)
- Edward's fritillary butterfly (Speyeria edwardsii)
- Empress Leilia butterfly (Asterocampa leilia)
- Fall armyworm (Spodoptera frugiperda)
- Field crescent butterfly (Phyciodes pulchella)
- Five-spotted hawkmoth (Manduca quinquemaculata)
- Freija fritillary butterfly (Boloria freija)
- Glassy cutworm (Crymodes devastator)
- Gorgone checkerspot butterfly (Chlosyne gorgone)
- Gray comma butterfly (Polygonia progne)
- Great Basin fritillary butterfly (Speyeria egleis)
- Great spangled fritillary butterfly (Speyeria cybele)
- Green comma butterfly (Polygonia faunus)
- Gulf fritillary butterfly (Agraulis vanillae)
- Hackberry emperor butterfly (Asterocampa celtis)
- Hoary comma butterfly (Polygonia gracilis)
- Hydaspe fritillary butterfly (Speyeria hydaspe)
- Indra swallowtail butterfly (Papilio indra)
- Leanira checkerspot butterfly (Chlosyne leanira)
- Lorquin's admiral butterfly (Limenitis lorquini)
- Milbert's tortoiseshell butterfly (Aglais milberti)
- Monarch butterfly (Danaus plexippus)
- Mormon fritillary butterfly (Speyeria mormonia)
- Mourning cloak butterfly (Nymphalis antiopa)
- Mylitta crescent butterfly (Phyciodes mylitta)
- Nokomis fritillary butterfly (Speyeria nokomis)
- Northern checkerspot butterfly (Chlosyne palla)
- Northern crescent butterfly (Phyciodes cocyta)
- Northwestern fritillary butterfly (Speyeria hesperis)
- Old World swallowtail butterfly (Papilio machaon)
- Painted lady butterfly (Vanessa cardui)
- Pale crescent butterfly (Phyciodes pallida)
- Pale swallowtail butterfly (Papilio eurymedon)
- Pallid crescentspot butterfly (Phyciodes picta)
- Pearl crescent butterfly (Phyciodes tharos)
- Pipevine swallowtail butterfly (Battus philenor)
- Queen butterfly (Danaus gilippus)
- Red admiral butterfly (Vanessa atalanta)
- Red-spotted purple butterfly (Limenitis arthemis astyanax)
- Relict fritillary butterfly (Boloria kriemhild)
- Rockslide checkerspot butterfly (Chlosyne whitneyi)
- Rocky Mountain parnassian butterfly (Parnassius smintheus)
- Silver-bordered fritillary butterfly (Boloria selene)
- Small white butterfly (Pieris rapae)
- Soldier butterfly (Danaus eresimus)
- Tropical buckeye butterfly (Junonia genoveva)
- Two-tailed swallowtail butterfly (Papilio multicaudata)
- Variable checkerspot butterfly (Euphydryas chalcedona)
- Variegated cutworm (Peridroma saucia)
- Variegated fritillary butterfly (Euptoieta claudia)
- Viceroy butterfly (Limenitis archippus)
- Weidemeyer's admiral butterfly (Limenitis weidemeyerii)
- West Coast lady butterfly (Vanessa annabella)
- Western bean cutworm (Striacosta albicosta)
- Western tiger swallowtail butterfly (Papilio rutulus)
- White admiral butterfly (Limenitis arthemis)
- White peacock butterfly (Anartia jatrophae)
- White-lined sphinx moth (Hyles lineata)
- Zerene fritillary butterfly (Speyeria zerene)

=== Mollusks ===
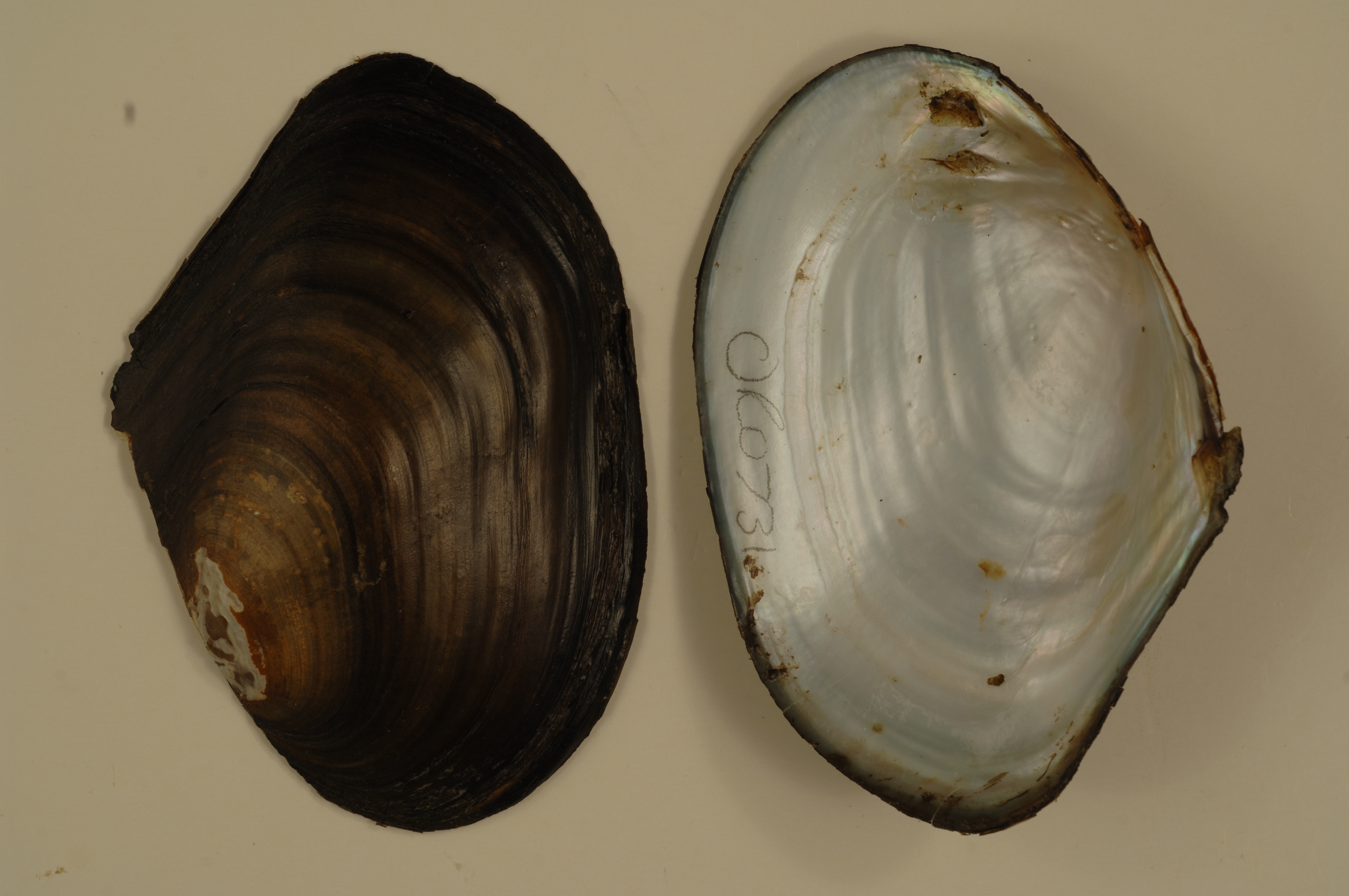
California floater

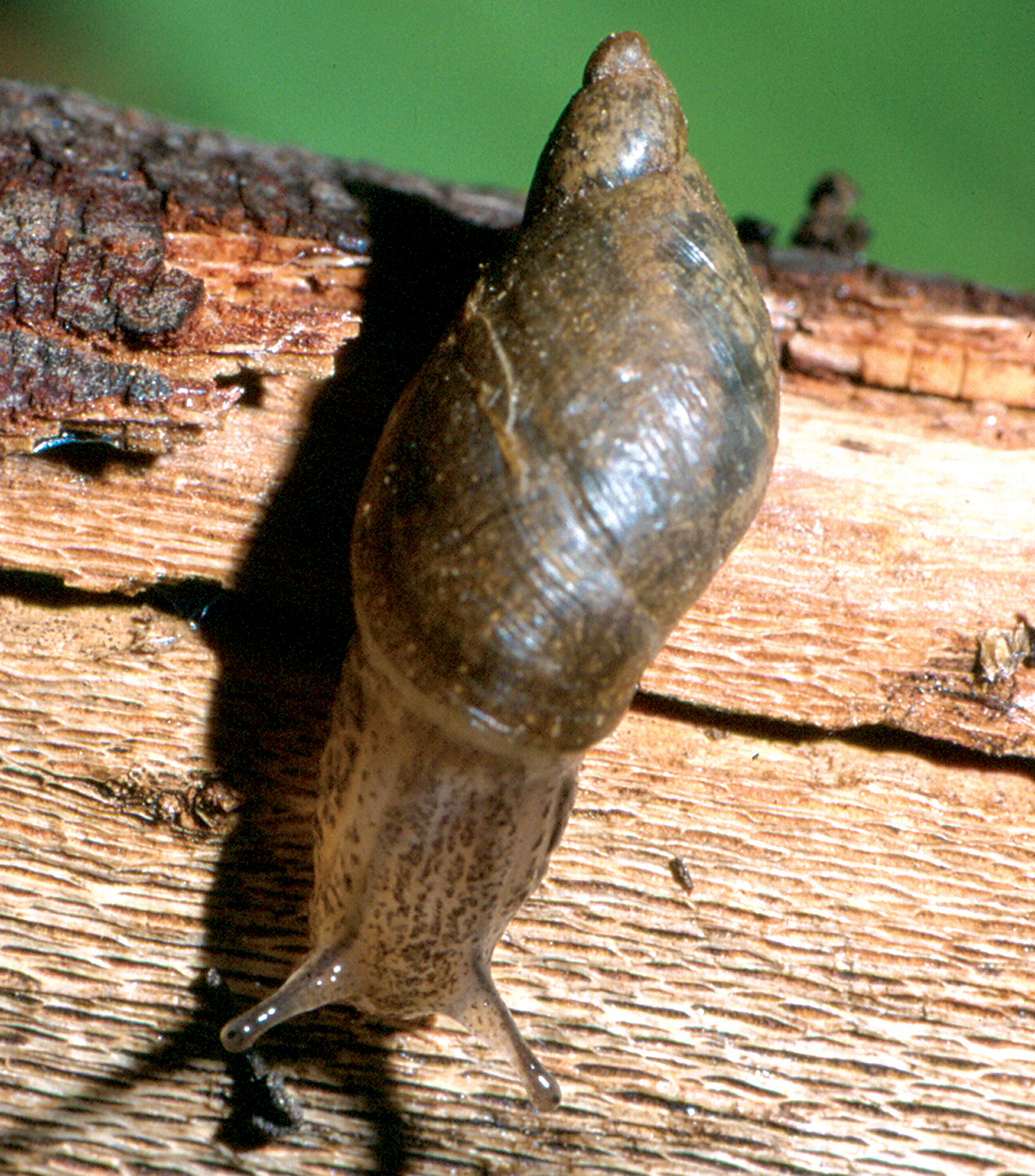
Kanab ambersnail

- Black gloss (Zonitoides nitidus)
- California floater (Anodonta californiensis)
- Desert springsnail (Pyrgulopsis deserta)
- Fat-whorled pondsnail (Stagnicola bonnevillensis)
- Fish Lake physa (Physella microstriata)
- Glass physa (Physa skinneri)
- Kanab ambersnail (Oxyloma kanabense)
- Land snail (Nesovitrea electrina)
- Minute gem (Hawaiia minuscula minuscula)
- New Zealand mud snail (Potamopyrgus antipodarum) - not native and considered invasive
- Ovate vertigo (Vertigo ovata)
- Quagga mussel (Dreissena bugensis) - considered an invasive species, found in Lake Powell and suspected of being in Deer Creek Reservoir
- Red-rimmed melania (Melanoides tuberculata) - not native and considered invasive
- Southern tightcoil (Ogaridiscus subrupicola)
- Striate gem (Hawaiia minuscula neomexicana)
- Thickshell pondsnail (Stagnicola utahensis)
- Thin-lip vallonia (Vallonia perspectiva)
- Utah physa (Physella utahensis)
- Utah roundmouth snail (Valvata utahensis)
- Variable vertigo (Vertigo gouldii)
- Western pearlshell (Margaritifera falcata)
- Wet rock physa (Physella zionis)
- Widespread column (or Moss chrysalis snail) (Pupilla muscorum)
- Winged floater (Anodonta nuttalliana)

=== Other ===
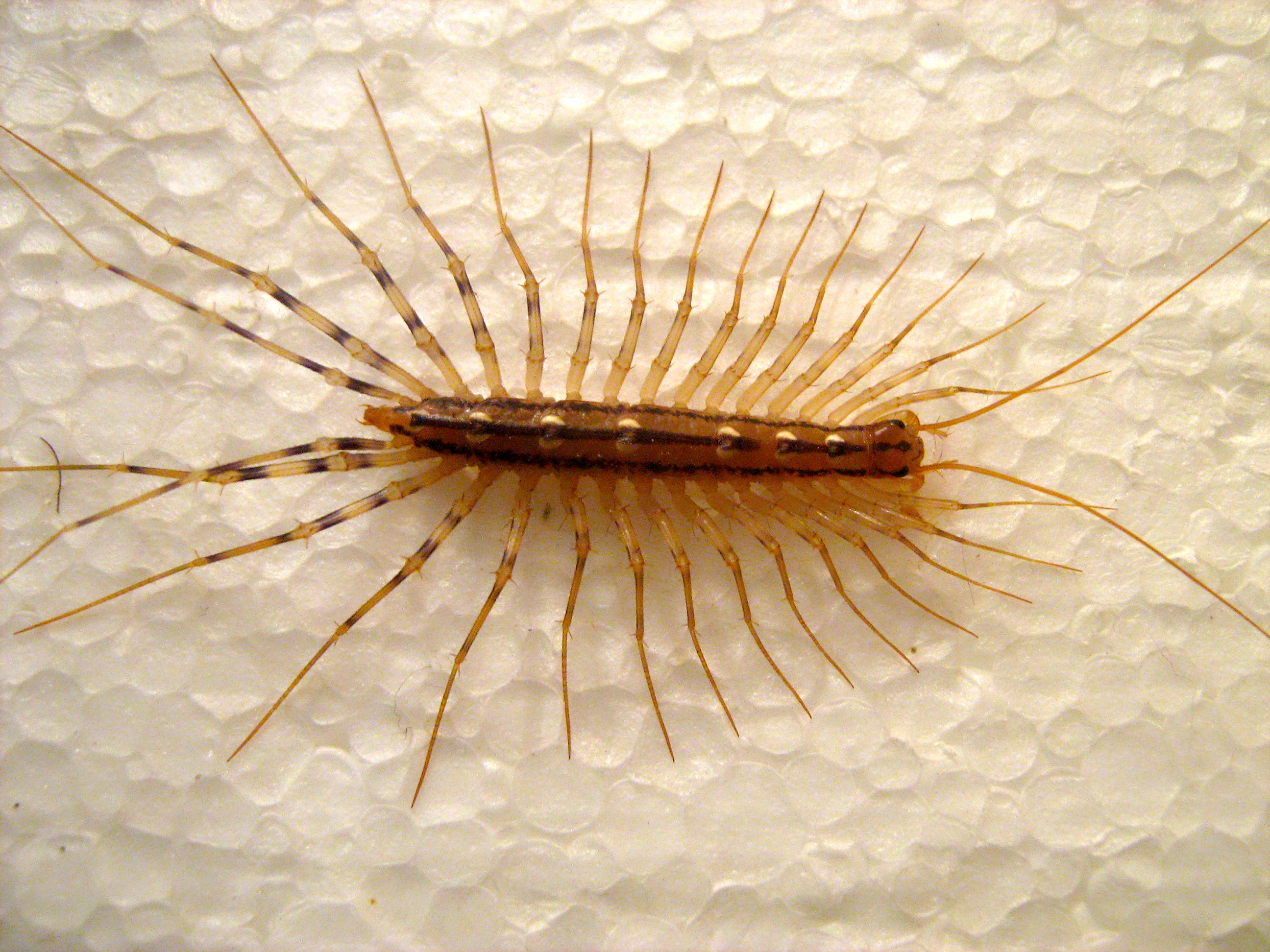
House centipede

- House centipede (Scutigera coleoptrata)

== Vertebrates ==
=== Amphibians ===
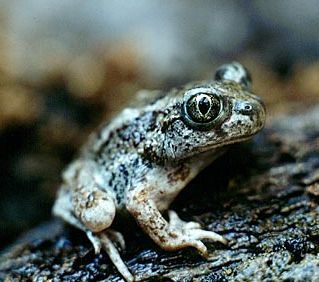
Great Basin spadefoot

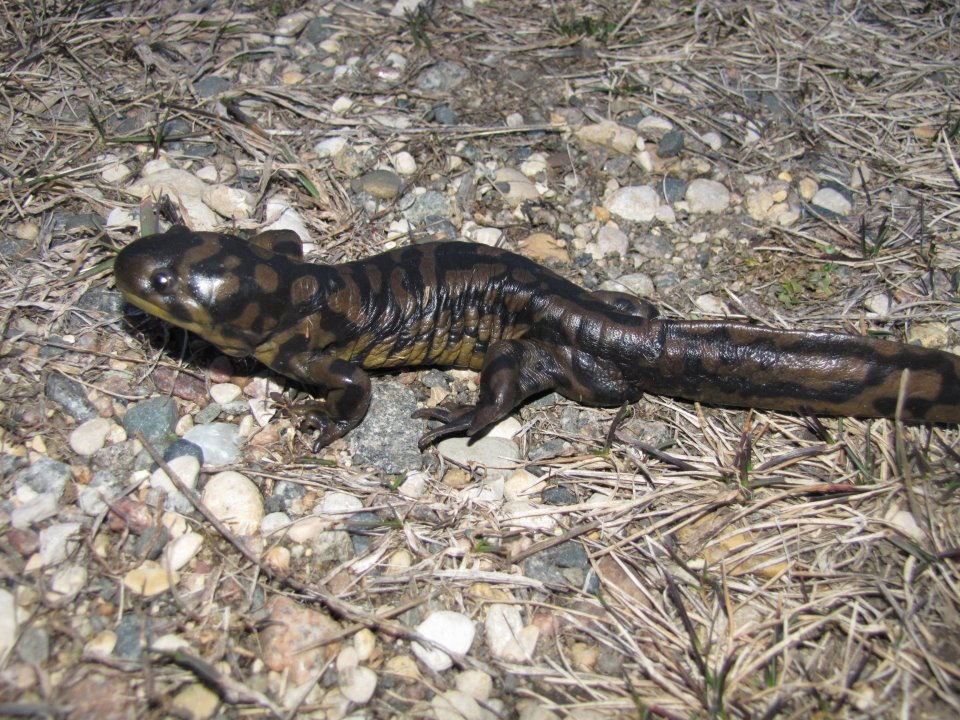
Tiger salamander

- American bullfrog (Rana catesbeiana) - not a native species
- Arizona toad (Bufo microscaphus)
- Canyon tree frog (Hyla arenicolor)
- Columbia spotted frog (Rana luteiventris) - on the Utah Sensitive Species List as a "conservation agreement species"
- Great Basin spadefoot (Spea intermontana)
- Great Plains toad (Bufo cognatus)
- Green frog (Rana clamitans) - not a native species
- New Mexico spadefoot toad (Spea multiplicata)
- Northern leopard frog (Rana pipiens)
- Pacific tree frog (Pseudacris regilla)
- Plains spadefoot toad (Spea bombifrons)
- Red-spotted toad (Bufo punctatus)
- Relict leopard frog (Rana onca) - endangered, possibly extirpated from Utah
- Tiger salamander (Ambystoma tigrinum) - the only native salamander species in Utah
- Western chorus frog (Pseudacris triseriata)
- Western toad (Bufo boreas)
- Woodhouse's toad (Bufo woodhousii)

=== Birds ===
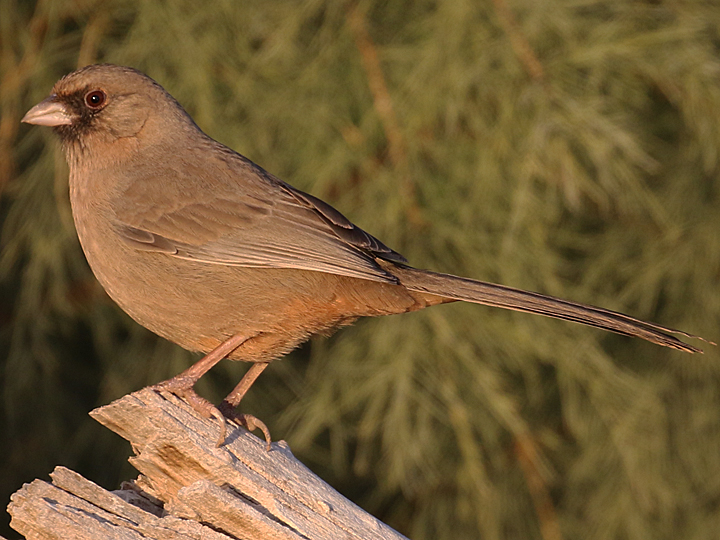
Abert's towhee

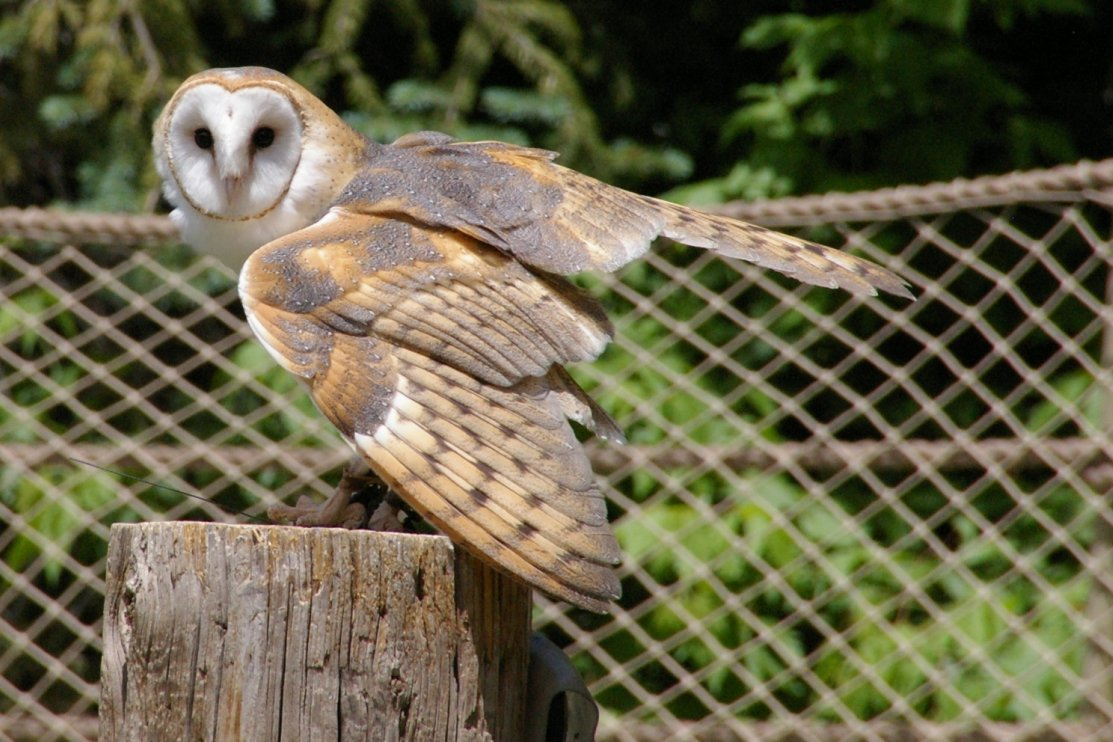
Barn owl

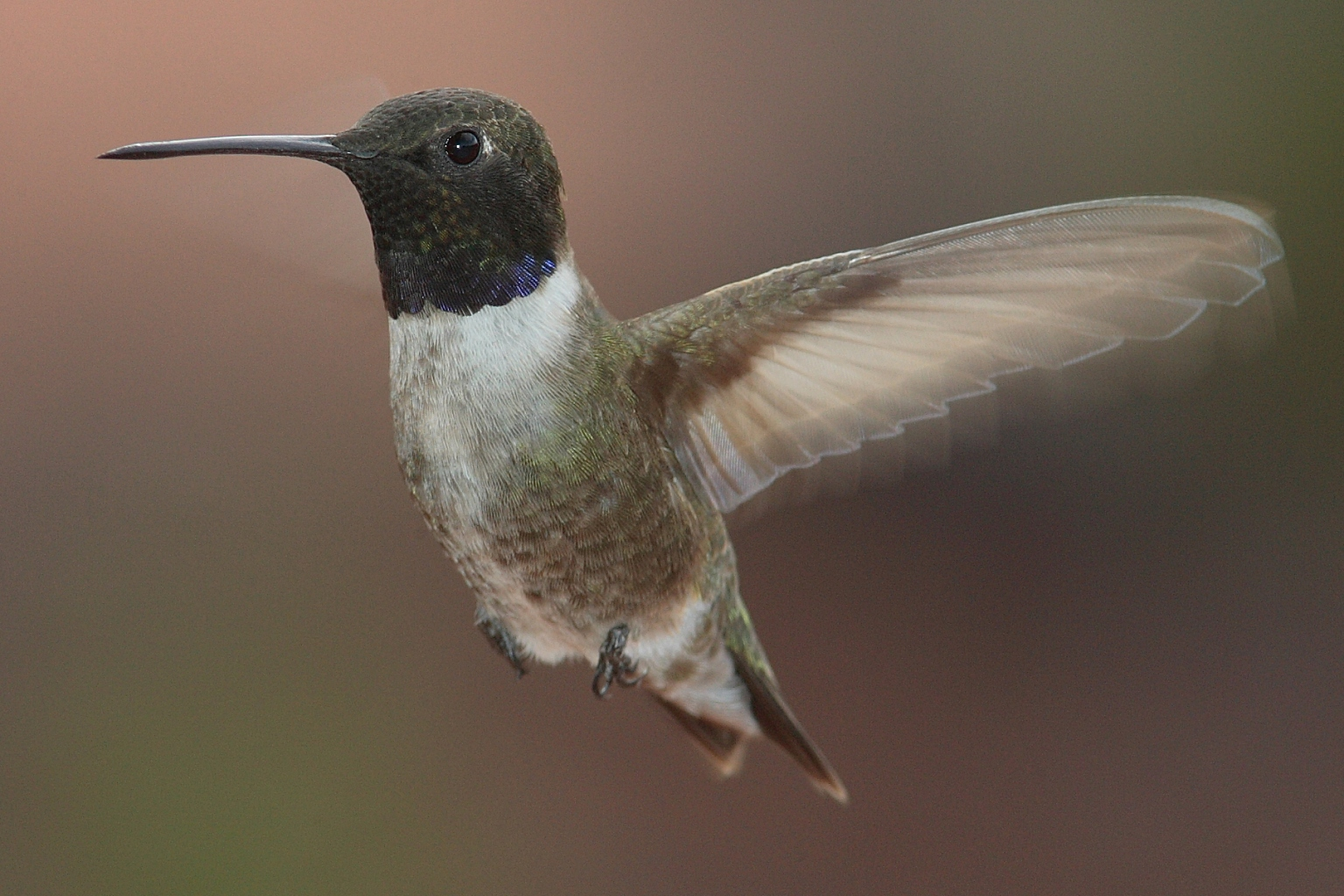
Black-chinned hummingbird

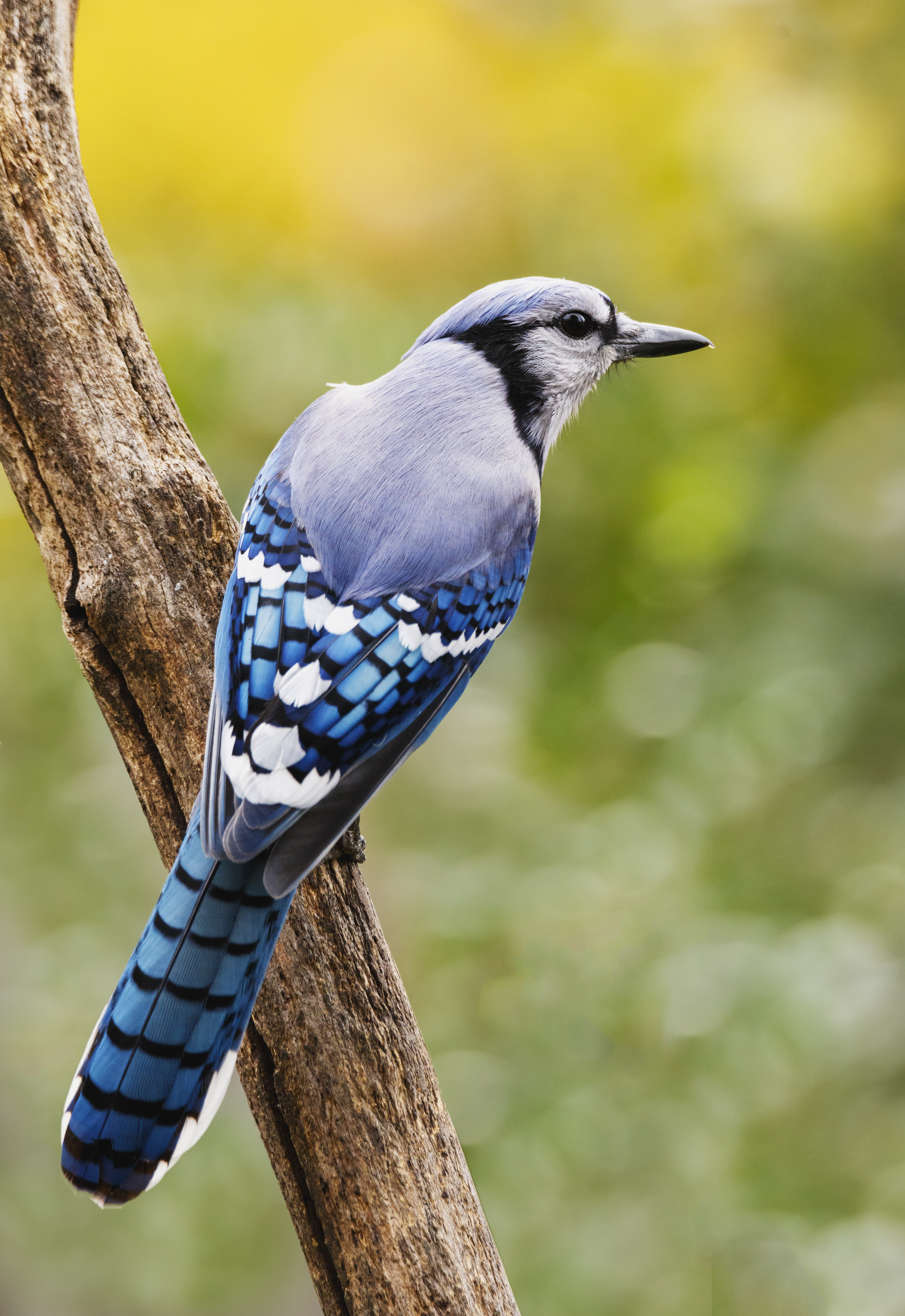
Blue jay

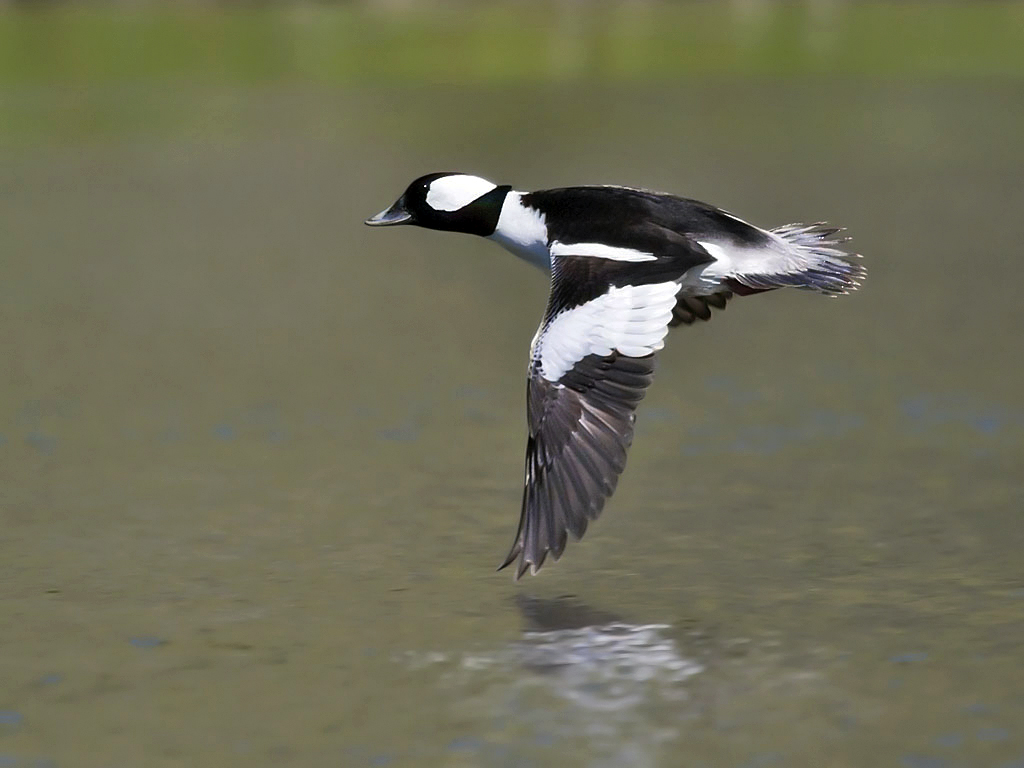
Bufflehead

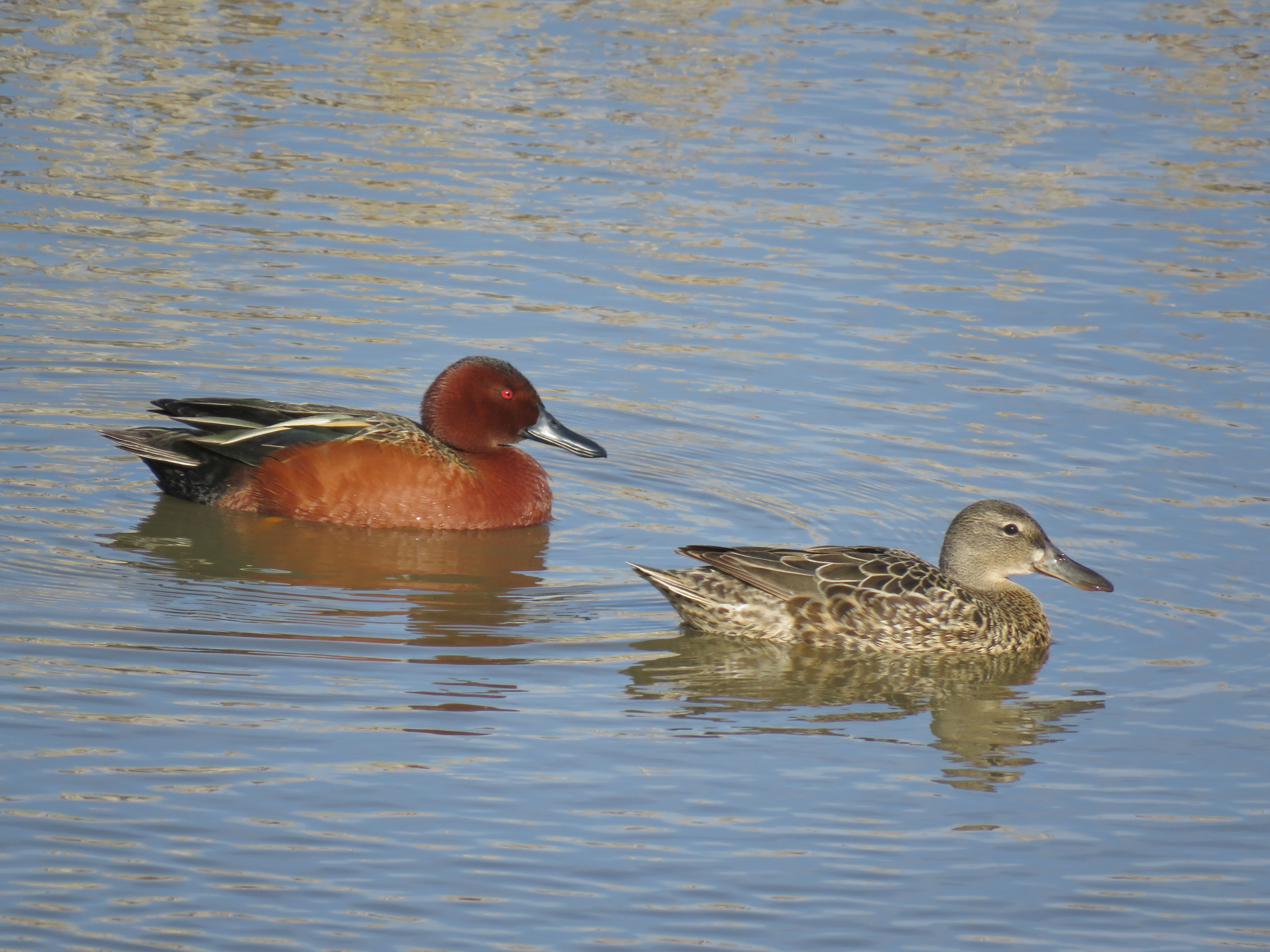
Cinnamon teals (male and female)

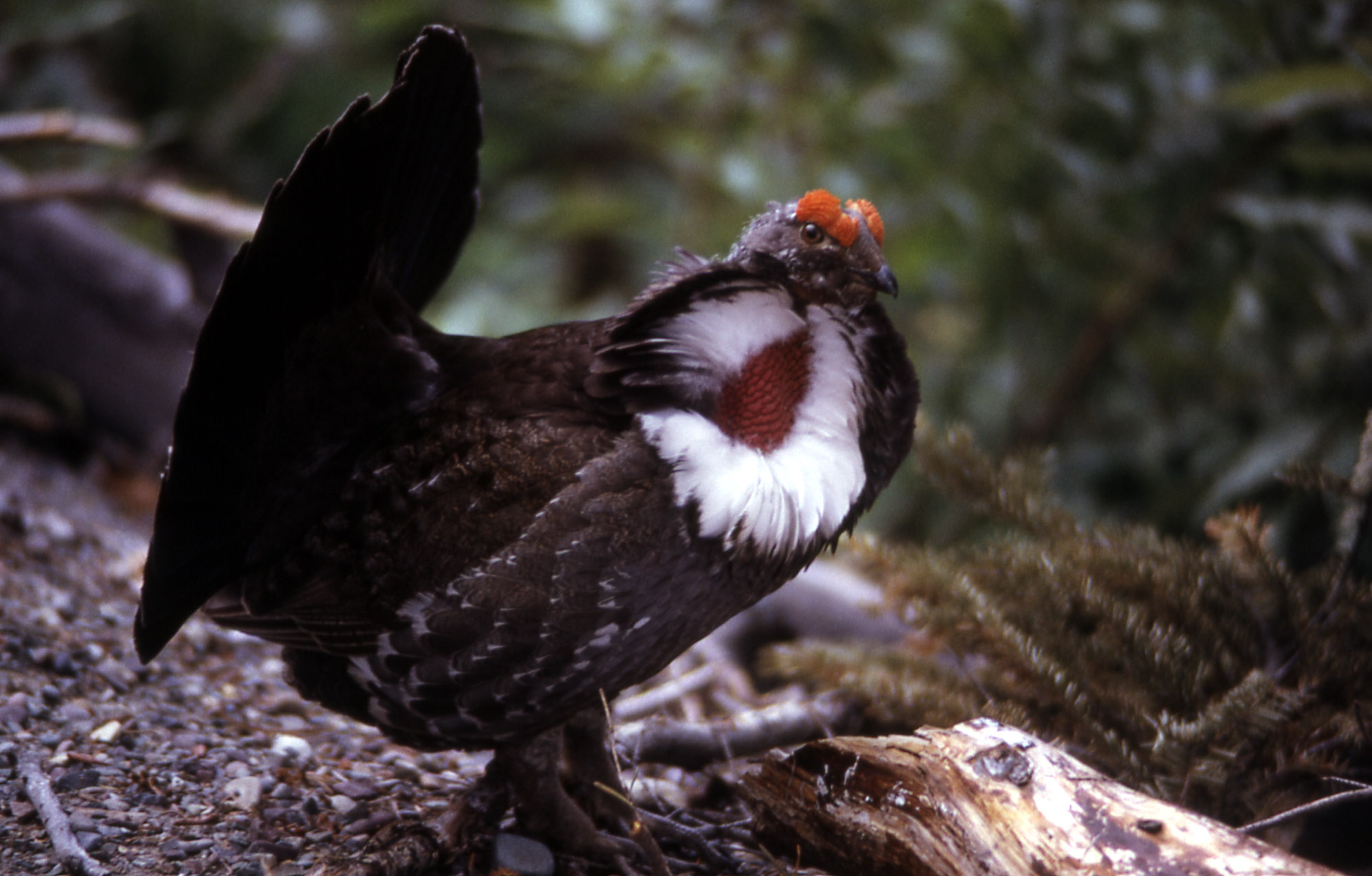
Male dusky grouse

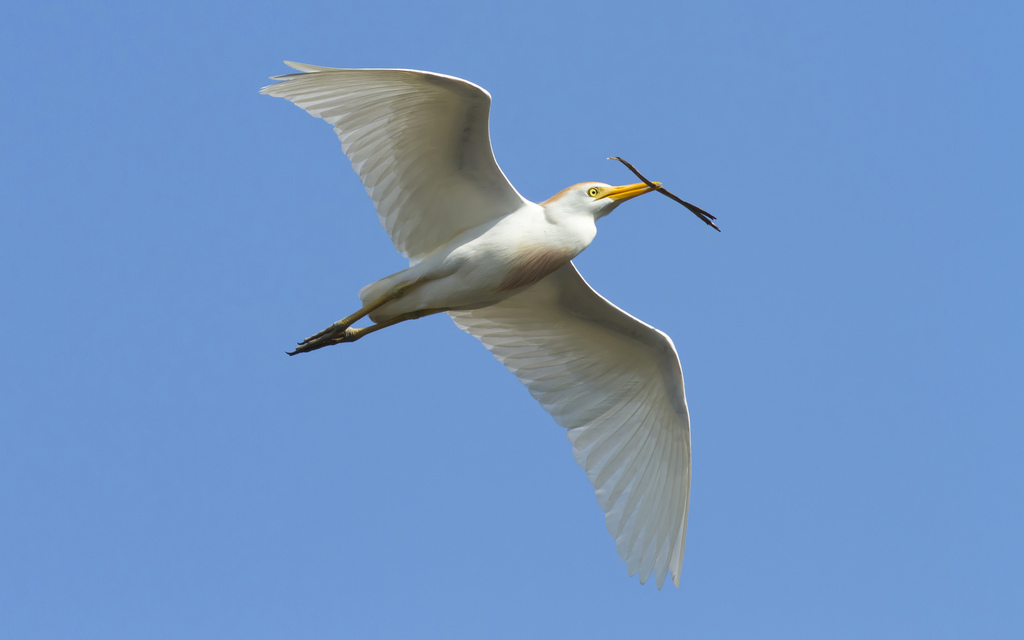
Western cattle egret

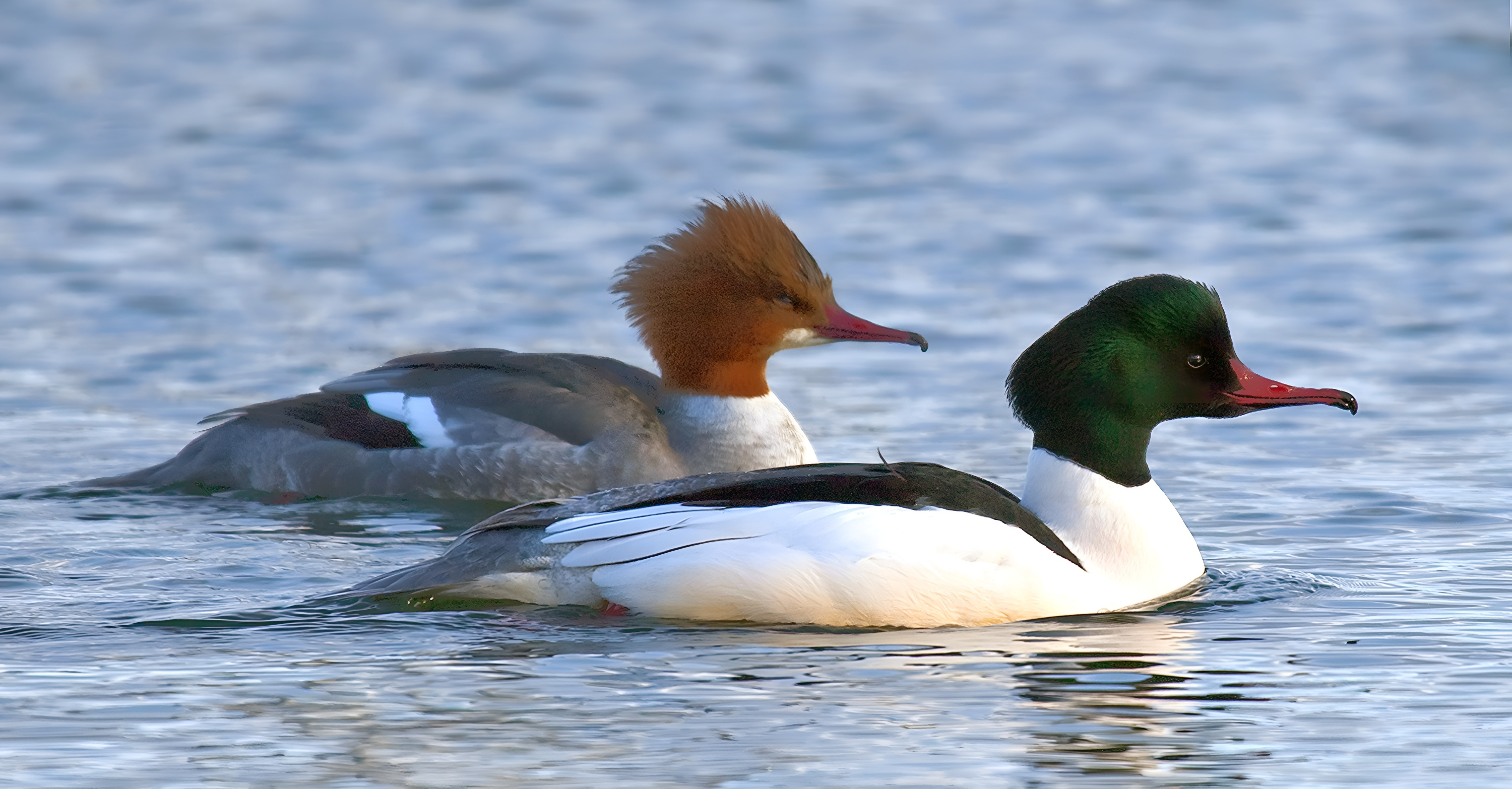
Common merganser

- Acorn woodpecker (Melanerpes formicivorus)
- Abert's towhee (Pipilo aberti)
- American avocet (Recurvirostra americana)
- American bittern (Botaurus lentiginosus)
- American cliff swallow (Petrochelidon pyrrhonota)
- American coot (Fulica americana)
- American crow (Corvus brachyrhynchos)
- American dipper (Cinclus mexicanus)
- American golden plover (Pluvialis dominica)
- American goldfinch (Carduelis tristis)
- American kestral (Falco sparverius)
- American pipit (Anthus rubescens) - also known as the buff-bellied pipit
- American redstart (Setophaga ruticilla)
- American robin (Turdus migratorius)
- American three-toed woodpecker (Picoides dorsalis)
- American tree sparrow (Spizella arborea)
- American white pelican (Pelecanus erythrorhynchos)
- American wigeon (Anas americana)
- Ash-throated flycatcher (Myiarchus cinerascens)
- Baird's sandpiper (Calidris bairdii)
- Bald eagle (Haliaeetus leucocephalus)
- Band-tailed pigeon (Patagioenas fasciata)
- Bank swallow (Riparia riparia) - also called sand martin
- Barn owl (Tyto alba)
- Barn swallow (Hirundo rustica)
- Barrow's goldeneye (Bucephala islandica)
- Bell's vireo (Vireo bellii)
- Belted kingfisher (Ceryle alcyon)
- Bendire's thrasher (Toxostoma bendirei)
- Bewick's wren (Thyromanes bewickii)
- Black phoebe (Sayornis nigricans)
- Black rosy finch (Leucosticte atrata)
- Black swift (Cypseloides niger)
- Black tern (Chlidonias niger)
- Black-and-white warbler (Mniotilta varia) - rare, transitory
- Black-bellied plover (Pluvialis squatarola)
- Black-billed cuckoo (Coccyzus erythropthalmus)
- Black-billed magpie (Pica hudsonia)
- Black-capped chickadee (Poecile atricapillus)
- Black-chinned hummingbird (Archilochus alexandri)
- Black-chinned sparrow (Spizella atrogularis)
- Black-crowned night heron (Nycticorax nycticorax)
- Black-headed grosbeak (Pheucticus melanocephalus)
- Black-necked stilt (Himantopus mexicanus)
- Black-tailed gnatcatcher (Polioptila melanura)
- Black-throated gray warbler (Dendroica nigrescens)
- Black-throated sparrow (Amphispiza bilineata)
- Blackpoll warbler (Dendroica striata) - rare, transitory
- Blue jay (Cyanocitta cristata) - rare, mainly in winter
- Blue-gray gnatcatcher (Polioptila caerulea)
- Blue-winged teal (Anas discors)
- Bobolink (Dolichonyx oryzivorus)
- Bohemian waxwing (Bombycilla garrulus)
- Bonaparte's gull (Larus philadelphia)
- Boreal owl (Aegolius funereus)
- Brewer's blackbird (Euphagus cyanocephalus)
- Brewer's sparrow (Spizella breweri breweri)
- Broad-tailed hummingbird (Selasphorus platycercus)
- Broad-winged hawk (Buteo platypterus) - uncommon, mostly transitory
- Brown creeper (Certhia americana)
- Brown thrasher (Toxostoma rufum)
- Brown-crested flycatcher (Myiarchus tyrannulus) - rare, transitory
- Brown-headed cowbird (Molothrus ater)
- Bufflehead (Bucephala albeola)
- Bullock's oriole (Icterus bullockii)
- Burrowing owl (Athene cunicularia)
- Bushtit (Psaltriparus minimus)
- Cackling goose (Branta hutchinsii)
- Cactus wren (Campylorhynchus brunneicapillus)
- California condor (Gymnogyps californianus) - endangered
- California gull (Larus californicus) - often called seagull
- California quail (Callipepla californica)
- Calliope hummingbird (Selasphorus calliope) - formerly Stellula calliope
- Canada goose (Branta canadensis)
- Canvasback (Aythya valisineria)
- Canyon wren (Catherpes mexicanus)
- Caspian tern (Sterna caspia)
- Cassin's finch (Carpodacus cassinii)
- Cassin's kingbird (Tyrannus vociferans)
- Cassin's vireo (Vireo cassinii)
- Cedar waxwing (Bombycilla cedrorum)
- Chipping sparrow (Spizella passerina)
- Chukar partridge (Alectoris chukar)
- Cinnamon teal (Anas cyanoptera)
- Clark's grebe (Aechmophorus clarki)
- Clark's nutcracker (Nucifraga columbiana)
- Common black hawk (Buteogallus anthracinus)
- Common goldeneye (Bucephala clangula)
- Common grackle (Quiscalus qusicula)
- Common loon (Gavia immer)
- Common merganser (Mergus merganser)
- Common moorhen (Gallinula chloropus)
- Common nighthawk (Chordeiles minor)
- Common poorwill (Phalaenoptilus nuttallii)
- Common raven (Corvus corax)
- Common redpoll (Carduelis flammea)
- Common tern (Sterna hirundo)
- Dusky grouse (Dendragapus obscurus) - sometimes called blue grouse
- Long-billed dowitcher (Limnodromus scolopaceus)
- Marbled godwit (Limosa fedoa)
- Red-necked phalarope (Phalaropus lobatus)
- Snowy plover (Charadrius nivosus)
- Western cattle egret (Bubulcus ibis)
- Western sandpiper (Calidris mauri)
- Wilson's phalarope (Phalaropus tricolor)
- Wood duck (Aix sponsa)

=== Fishes ===
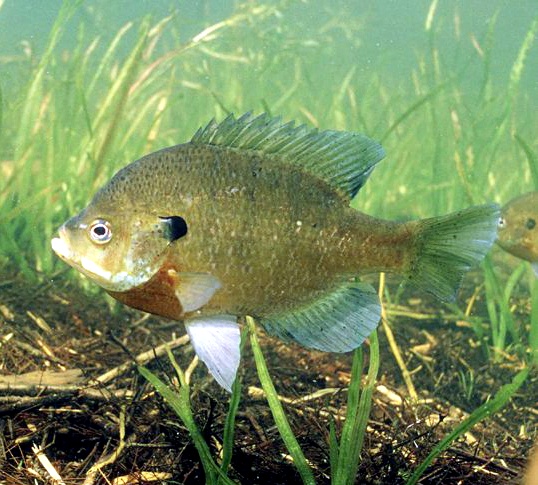
Bluegill

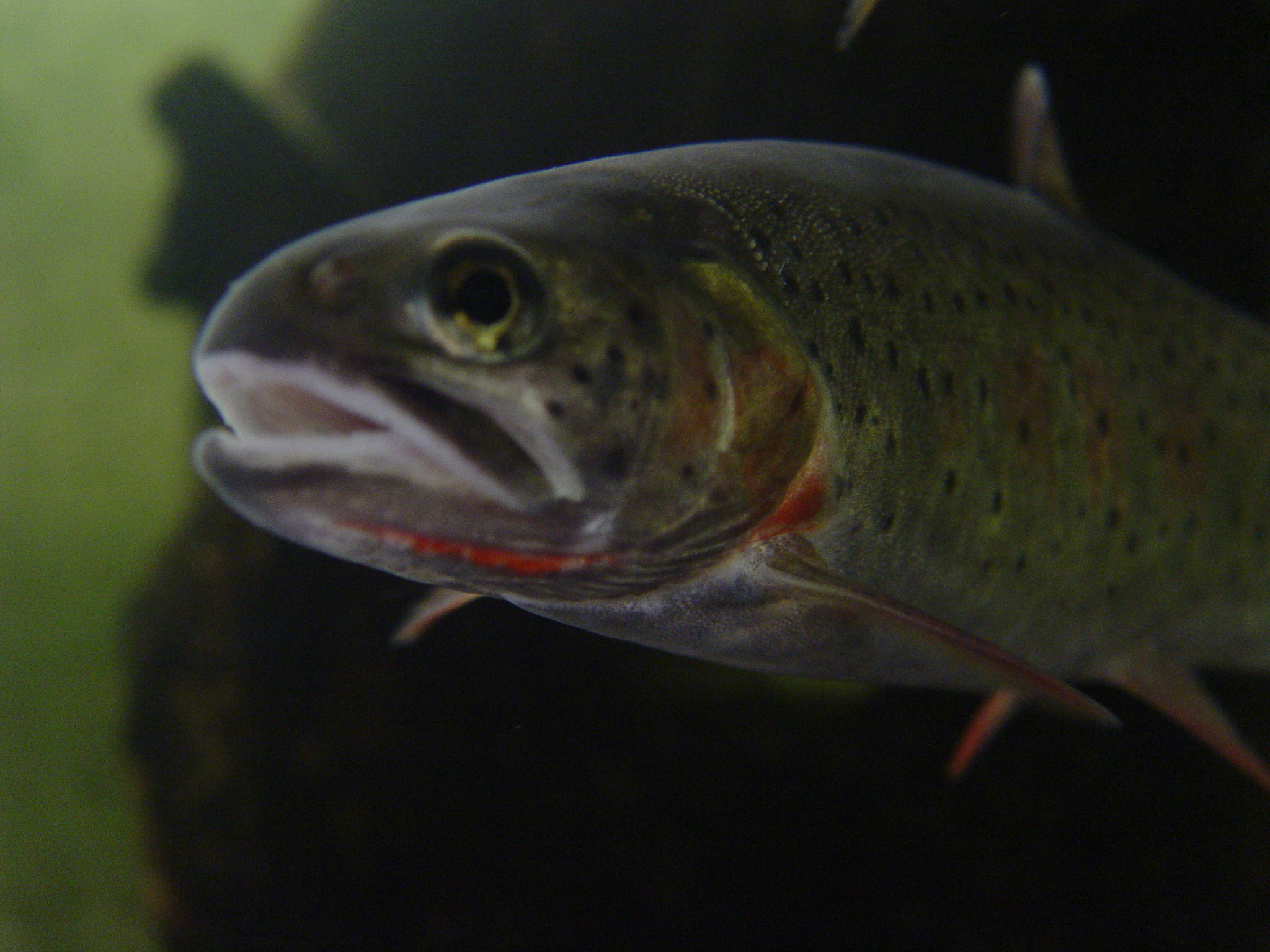
Colorado River cutthroat trout

- Arctic grayling (Thymallus arcticus) - introduced fish, not native to Utah
- Bear Lake sculpin (Cottus extensus) - listed as "vulnerable", found only in Bear Lake
- Bear Lake whitefish (Prosopium abyssicola) - found only in Bear Lake
- Black bullhead (Ameiurus melas)
- Black crappie (Pomoxis nigromaculatus)
- Bluegill (Lepomis macrochirus) - introduced fish, not native to Utah
- Bluehead sucker (Catostomus discobolus) - on the Utah Sensitive Species List
- Bonneville cisco (Prosopium gemmifer) - found only in Bear Lake
- Bonneville cutthroat trout (Oncorhynchus virginalis utah)
- Bonneville whitefish (Prosopium spilonotus) - found only in Bear Lake
- Bonytail chub (Gila elegans) - Federally listed as critically endangered
- Brassy minnow (Hybognathus hankinsoni) - introduced fish, not native to Utah
- Brook stickleback (Culaea inconstans) - introduced fish, not native to Utah
- Brook trout (Salvelinus fontinalis) - introduced fish, not native to Utah
- Brown trout (Salmo trutta) - introduced fish, not native to Utah
- Burbot (Lota lota) - illegally introduced fish, not native to Utah
- Channel catfish (Ictalurus punctatus) - introduced fish, not native to Utah
- Colorado pikeminnow (Ptychocheilus lucius) - Federally listed as vulnerable
- Colorado River cutthroat trout (Oncorhynchus virginalis pleuriticus)
- Common carp (Cyprinus carpio) - introduced, invasive fish, not native to Utah
- Rocky Mountain Cutthroat trout (Oncorhynchus virginalis)
- June sucker (Chasmistes liorus)
- Least chub (Iotichthys phlegethontis)
- Utah Lake sculpin (Cottus echinatus) - extinct, last observed in the 1920s

=== Mammals ===
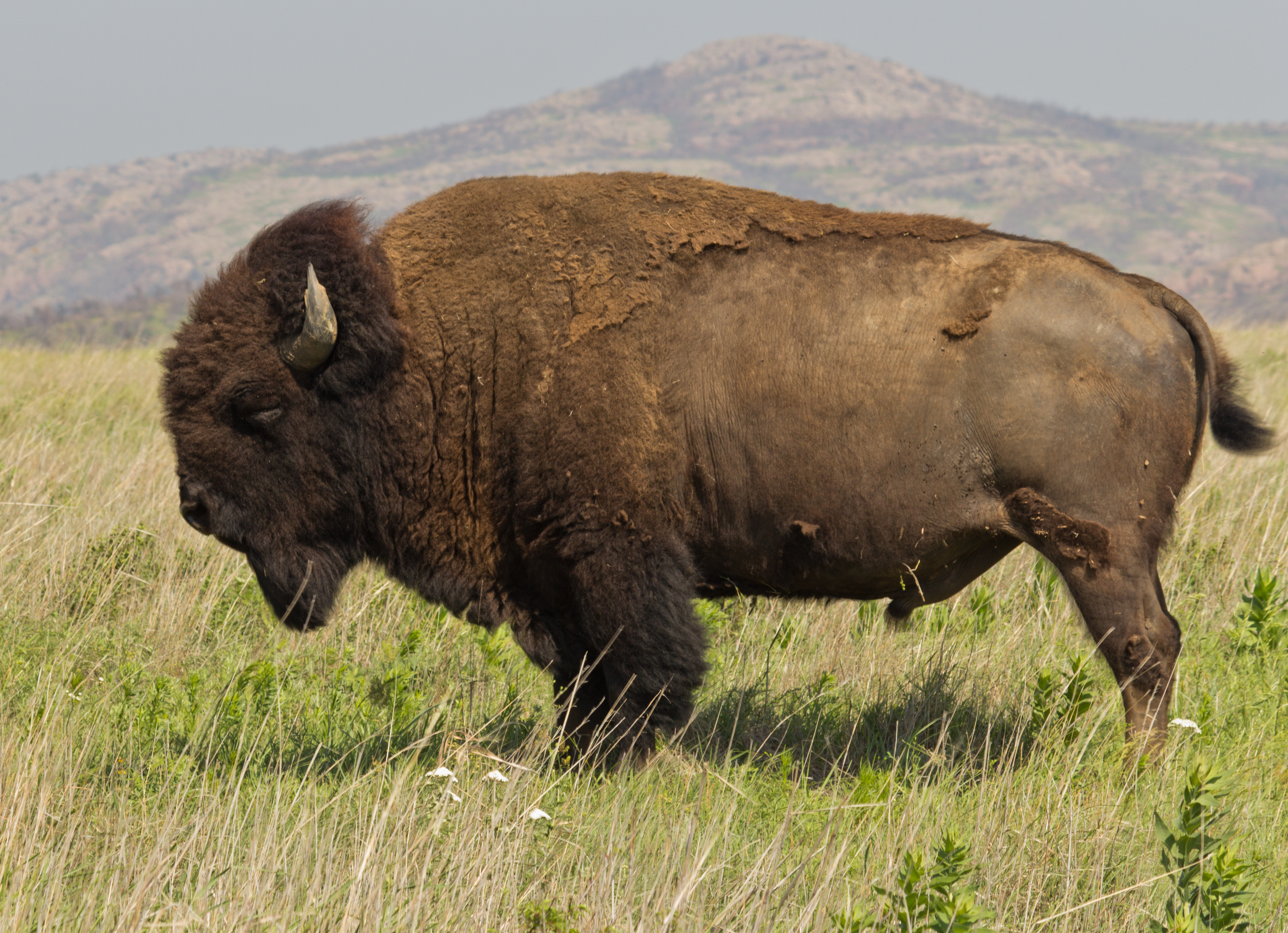
American bison

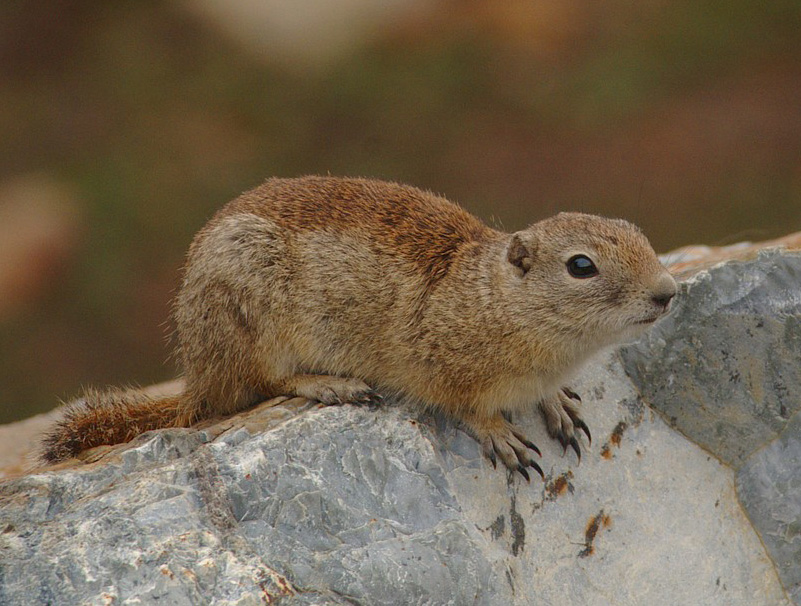
Belding's ground squirrel

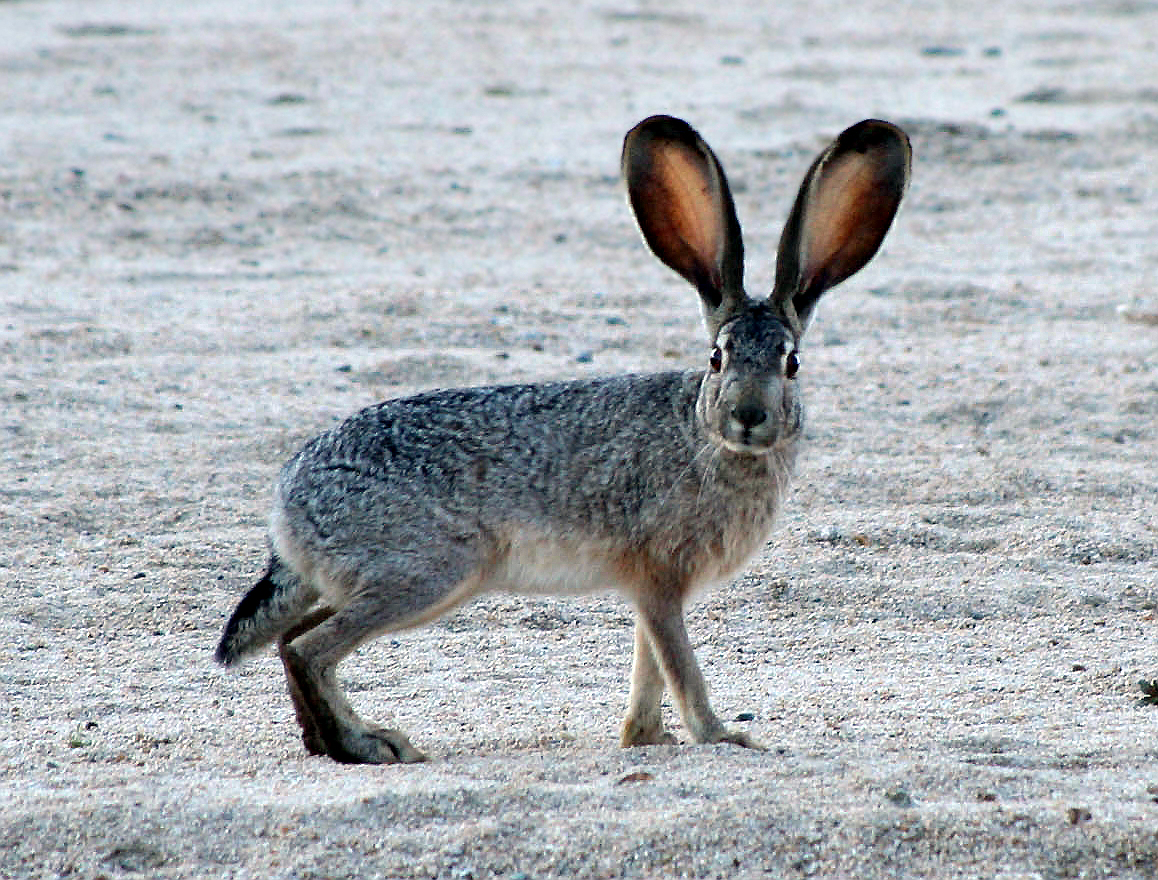
Black-tailed jackrabbit

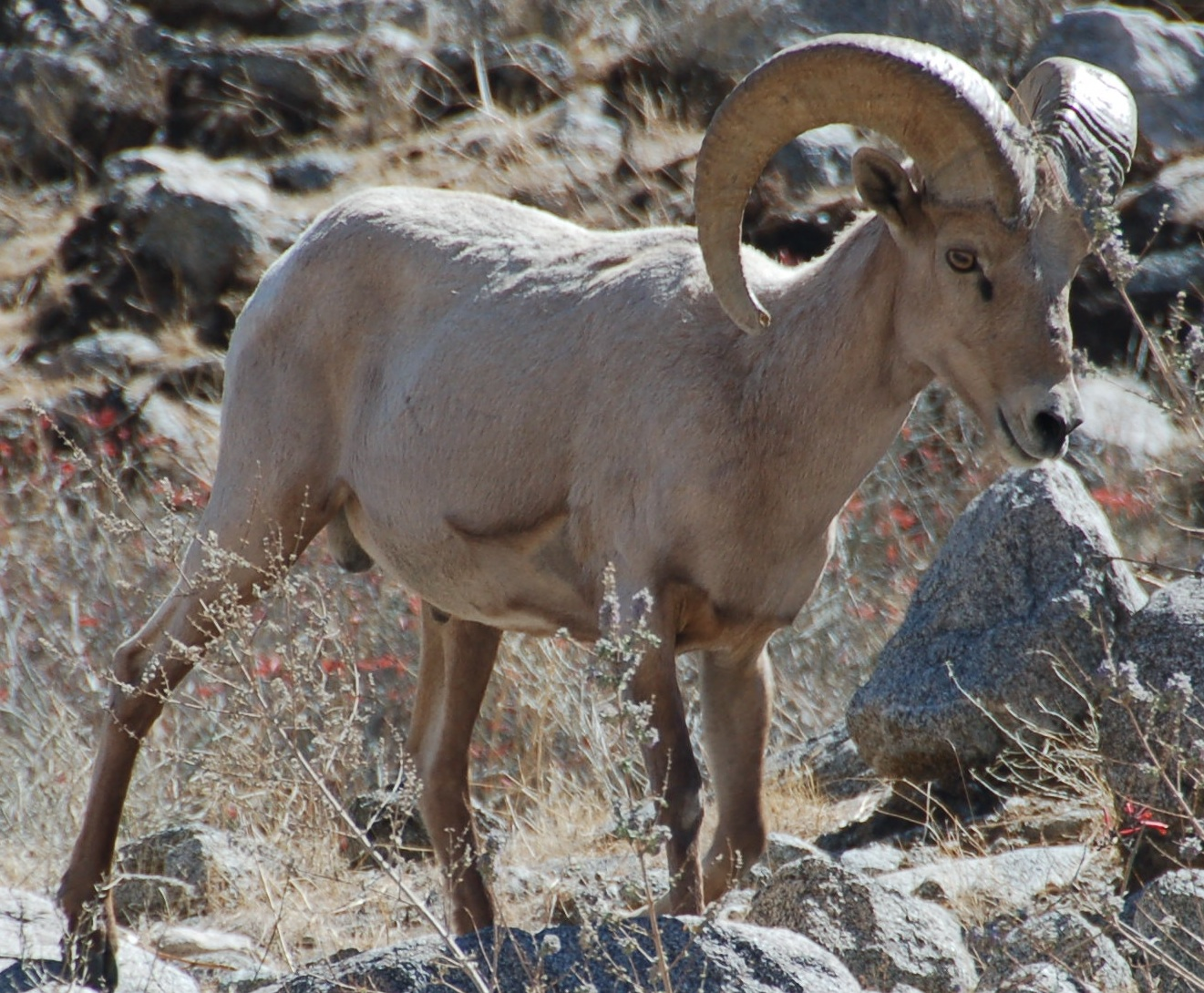
Desert bighorn sheep

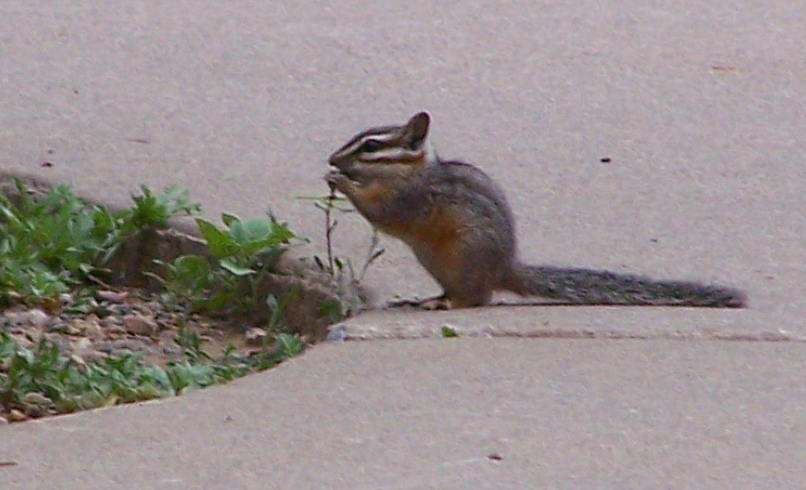
Cliff chipmunk

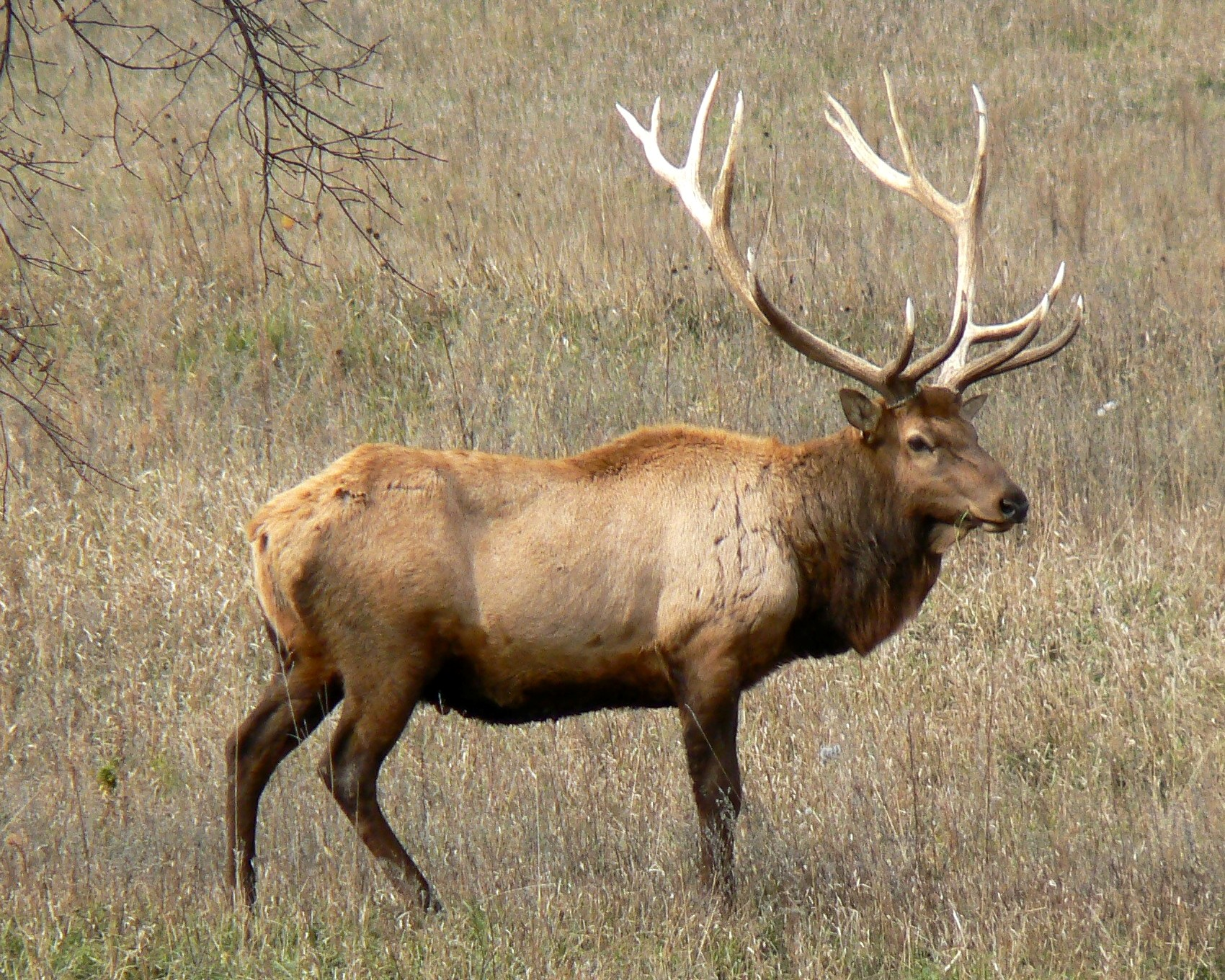
Elk

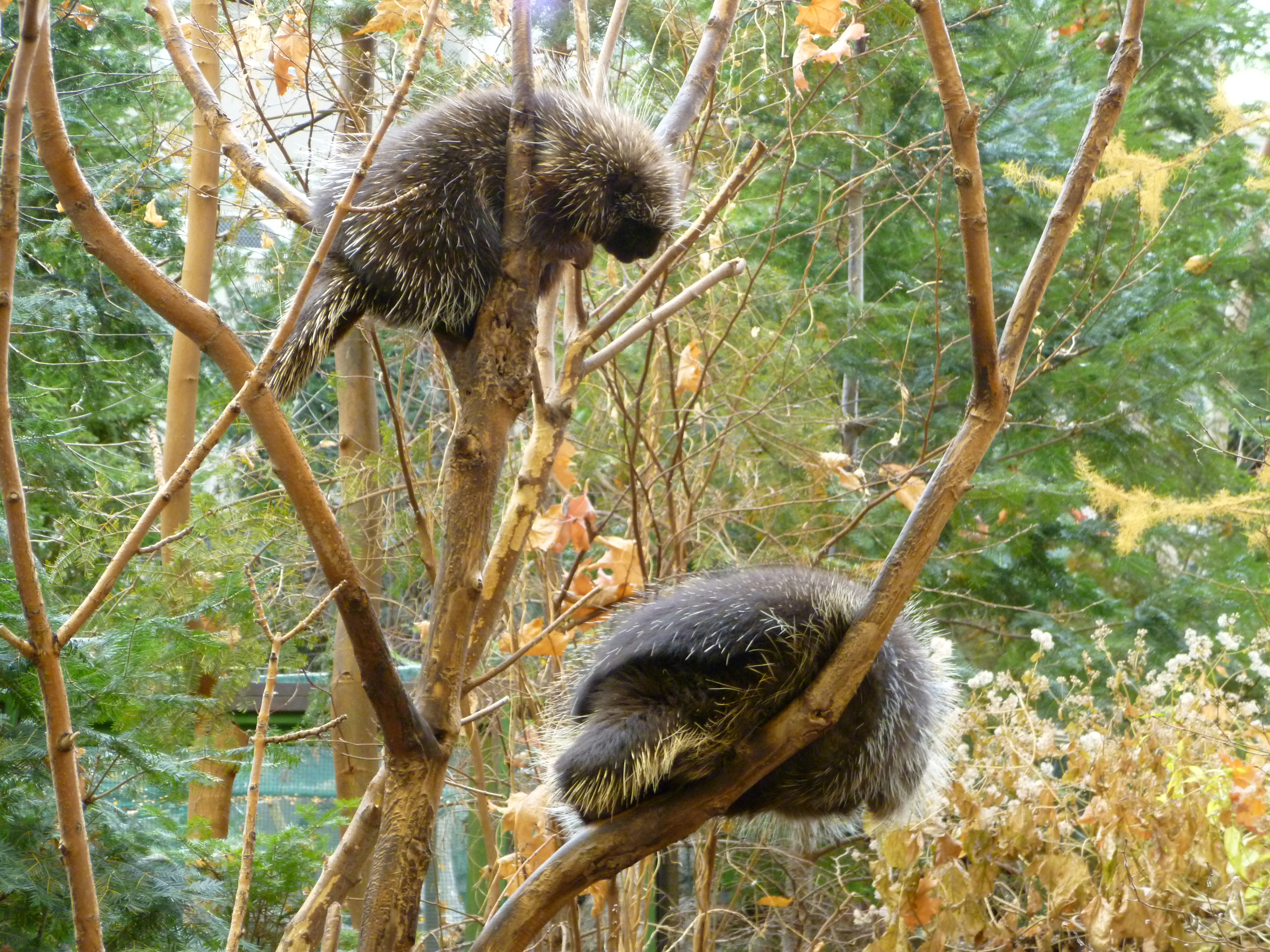
North American porcupine

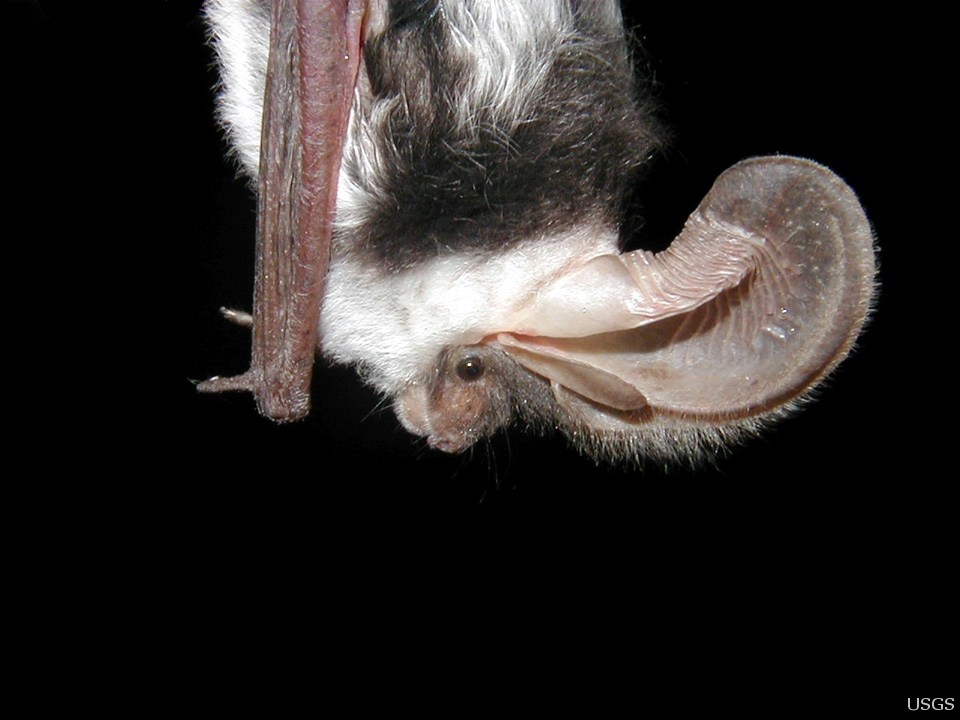
Spotted bat

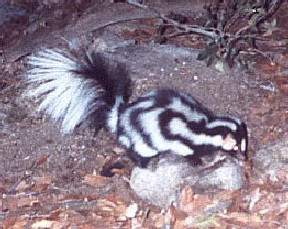
Western spotted skunk

- Abert's squirrel (Sciurus aberti)
- Allen's big-eared bat (Idionycteris phyllotis)
- American badger (Taxidea taxus)
- American bison (Bos bison or Bison bison)
- American black bear (Ursus americanus)
- American ermine (Mustela richardsonii)
- American marten (Martes americana)
- American mink (Neogale vison)
- American pika (Ochotona princeps)
- American red squirrel (Tamiasciurus hudsonicus)
- American water shrew (Sorex palustris)
- Arizona woodrat (Neotoma devia)
- Belding's ground squirrel (Spermophilus beldingi or Urocitellus beldingi)
- Big brown bat (Eptesicus fuscus)
- Big free-tailed bat (Nyctinomops macrotis)
- Black rat (Rattus rattus)
- Black-footed ferret (Mustela nigripes)
- Black-tailed jackrabbit (Lepus californicus)
- Bobcat (Lynx rufus)
- Botta's pocket gopher (Thomomys bottae)
- Brown bear (Ursus arctos) – extirpated
- Brown rat (Rattus norvegicus)
- Brush mouse (Peromyscus boylii)
- Bushy-tailed woodrat (Neotoma cinerea)
- Cactus mouse (Peromyscus eremicus)
- California bighorn sheep (Ovis canadensis californiana)
- California myotis (Myotis californicus)
- Canada lynx (Lynx canadensis)
- Canyon mouse (Peromyscus crinitus)
- Chisel-toothed kangaroo rat (Dipodomys microps)
- Cinereus shrew (Sorex cinereus)
- Cliff chipmunk (Tamias dorsalis or Neotamias dorsalis)
- Cougar (Puma concolor)
- Coyote (Canis latrans)
- Crawford's gray shrew (Notiosorex crawfordi)
- Dark kangaroo mouse (Microdipodops megacephalus)
- Desert bighorn sheep (Ovis canadensis nelsoni)
- Desert cottontail (Sylvilagus audubonii)
- Desert kangaroo rat (Dipodomys deserti)
- Desert pocket mouse (Chaetodipus penicillatus)
- Desert woodrat (Neotoma lepida)
- Dwarf shrew (Sorex nanus)
- Elk/Wapati (Cervus canadensis)
- Fringed myotis (Myotis thysanodes)
- Golden-mantled ground squirrel (Callospermophilus lateralis)
- Gray fox (Urocyon cinereoargenteus)
- Gray wolf (Canis lupus) – no confirmed mating pairs living in Utah, though there having been sitings in northeastern Utah along the Wyoming border
- Great Basin pocket mouse (Perognathus parvus)
- Hoary bat (Lasiurus cinereus)
- House mouse (Mus musculus)
- Kit fox (Vulpes macrotis)
- Least chipmunk (Tamias minimus)
- Little brown bat (Myotis lucifugus)
- Long-eared myotis (Myotis evotis)
- Long-legged myotis (Myotis volans)
- Long-tailed vole (Microtus longicaudus)
- Long-tailed weasel (Neogale frenata)
- Meadow vole (Microtus pennsylvanicus)
- Mexican free-tailed bat (Tadarida brasiliensis)
- Montane shrew (Sorex monticolus)
- Montane vole (Microtus montanus)
- Moose (Alces alces)
- Mountain cottontail (Sylvilagus nuttallii)
- Mountain goat (Oreamnos americanus)
- Mule deer (Odocoileus hemionus)
- Muskrat (Ondatra zibethicus)
- North American beaver (Castor canadensis)
- North American deer mouse (Peromyscus maniculatus)
- North American porcupine (Erethizon dorsatum)
- North American river otter (Lontra canadensis)
- Northern flying squirrel (Glaucomys sabrinus)
- Northern grasshopper mouse (Onychomys leucogaster)
- Northern pocket gopher (Thomomys talpoides)
- Ord's kangaroo rat (Dipodomys ordii)
- Pinyon mouse (Peromyscus truei)
- Piute ground squirrel (Urocitellus mollis)
- Pronghorn (Antilocapra americana)
- Raccoon (Procyon lotor)
- Red deer (Cervus elaphus)
- Red fox (Vulpes vulpes)
- Ring-tailed cat (Bassariscus astutus)
- Rock squirrel (Otospermophilus variegatus)
- Rocky Mountain bighorn sheep (Ovis canadensis canadensis)
- Silver-haired bat (Lasionycteris noctivagans)
- Snowshoe hare (Lepus americanus)
- Southern red-backed vole (Clethrionomys gapperi)
- Spotted bat (Euderma maculatum)
- Striped skunk (Mephitis mephitis)
- Townsend's big-eared bat (Corynorhinus townsendii)
- Uinta chipmunk (Tamias umbrinus)
- Uinta ground squirrel (Urocitellus armatus)
- Vagrant shrew (Sorex vagrans)
- Water vole (Microtus richardsoni)
- Western harvest mouse (Reithrodontomys megalotis)
- Western heather vole (Phenacomys intermedius)
- Western jumping mouse (Zapus princeps)
- Western small-footed bat (Myotis ciliolabrum)
- Western spotted skunk (Spilogale gracilis)
- White-tailed antelope squirrel (Ammospermophilus leucurus)
- White-tailed deer (Odocoileus virginianus)
- White-tailed jackrabbit (Lepus townsendii)
- Wolverine (Gulo gulo)
- Yellow-bellied marmot (Marmota flaviventris)

=== Reptiles ===
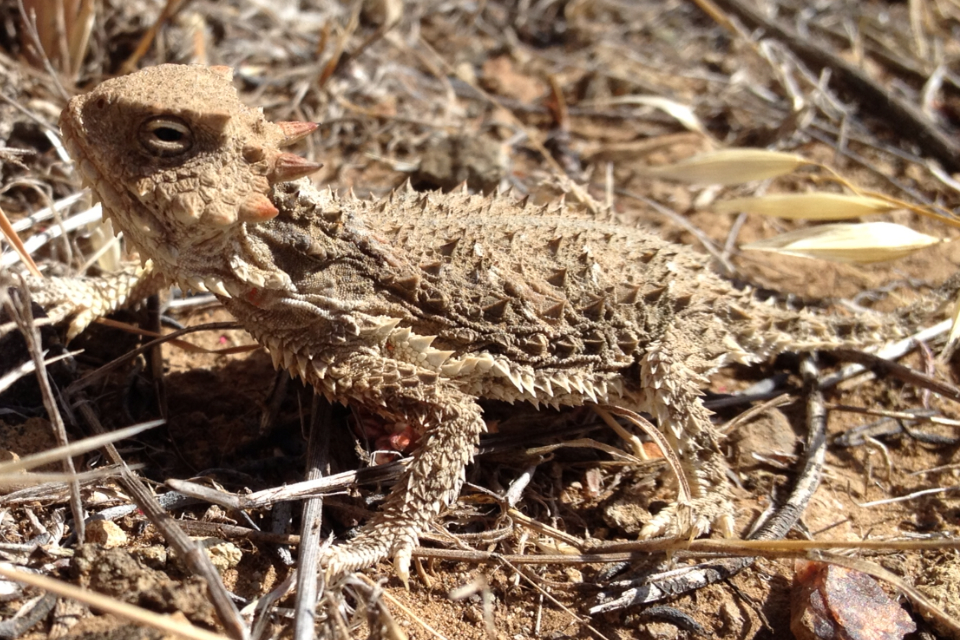
Desert horned lizard

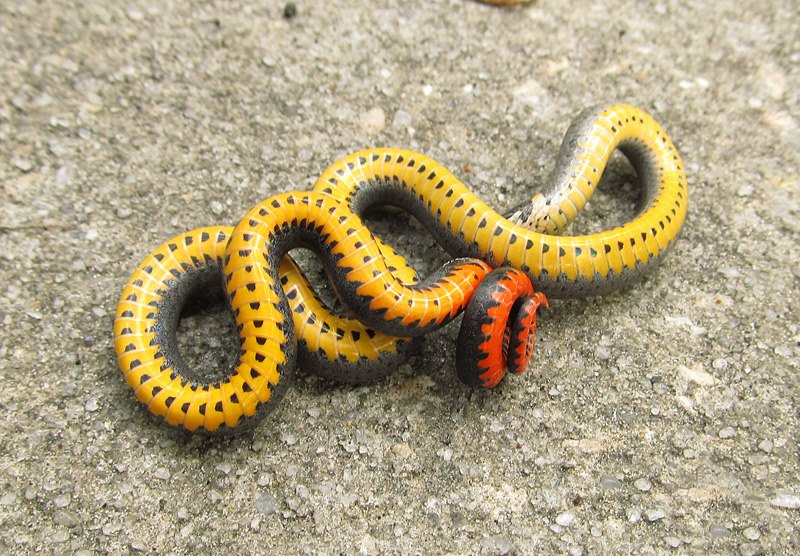
Ring-necked snake

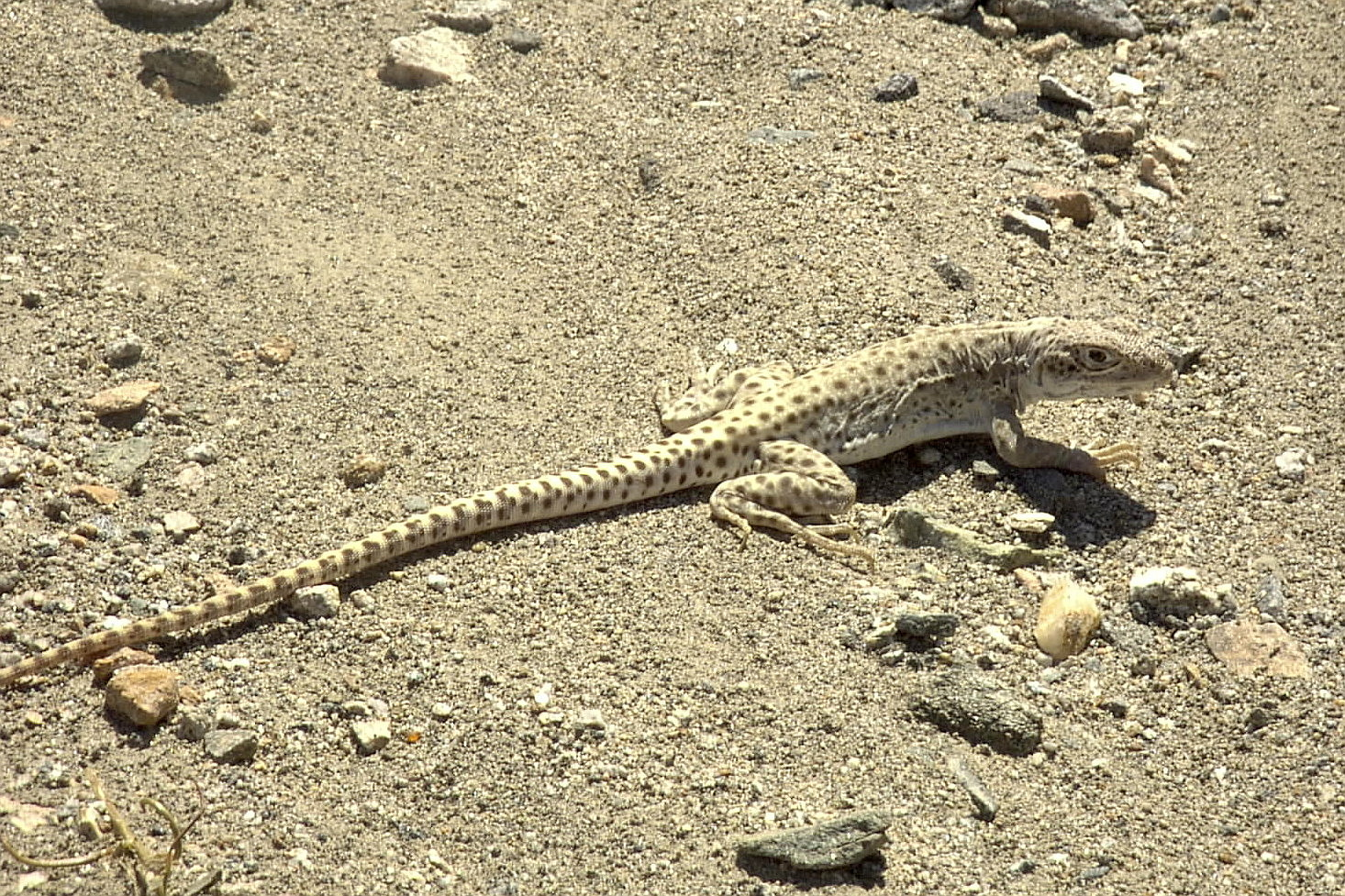
Long-nosed leopard lizard

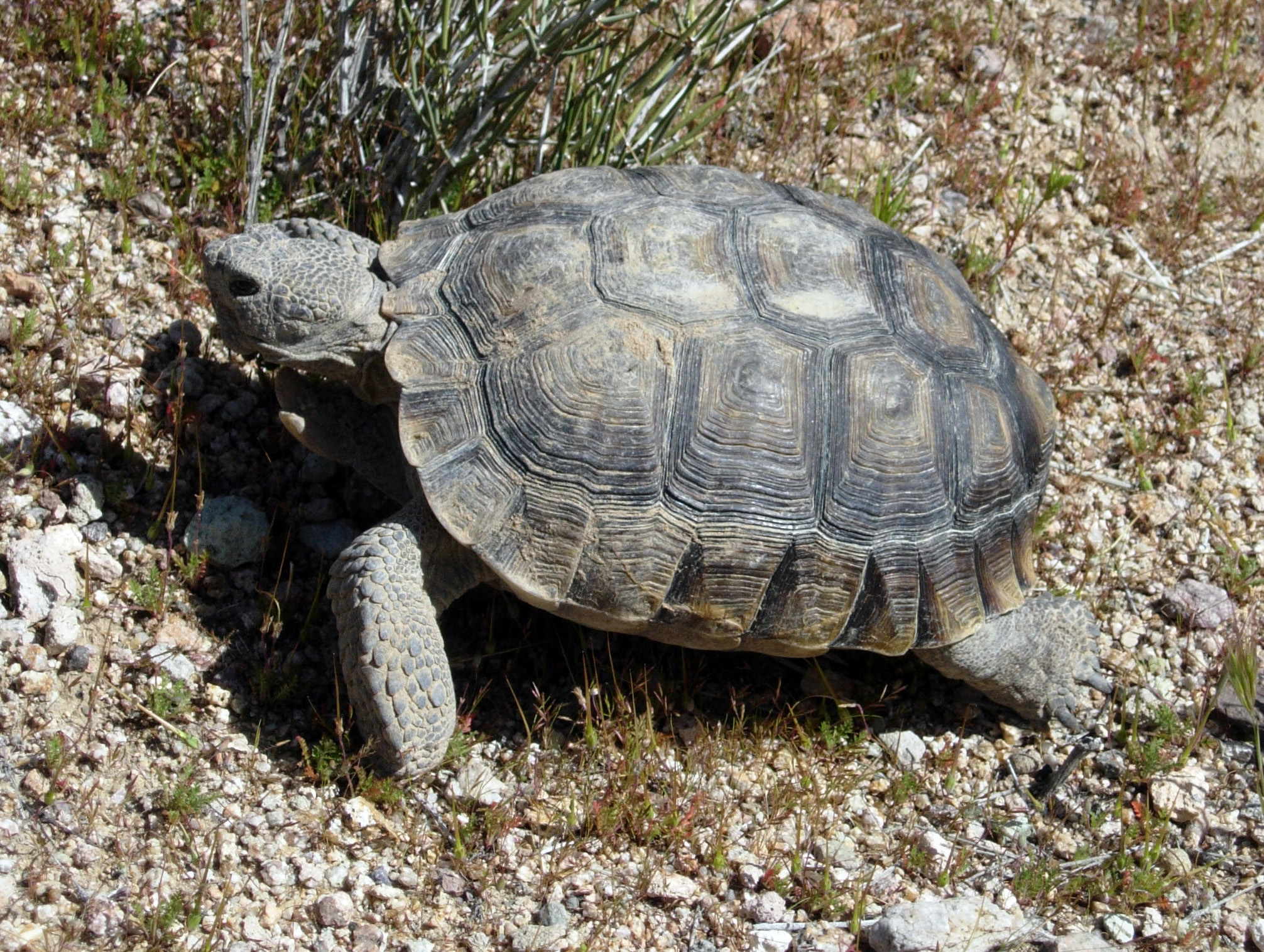
Desert tortoise

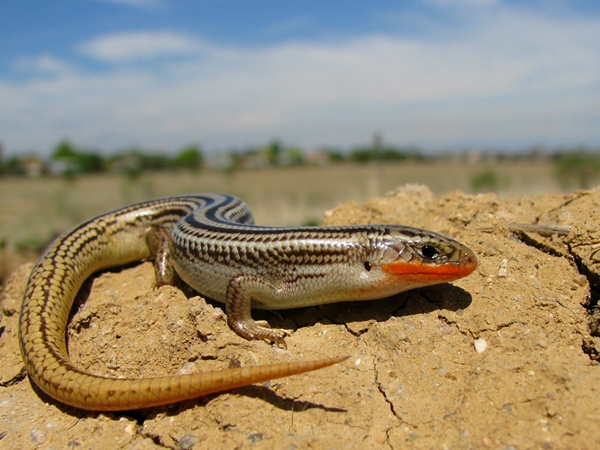
Many-lined skink

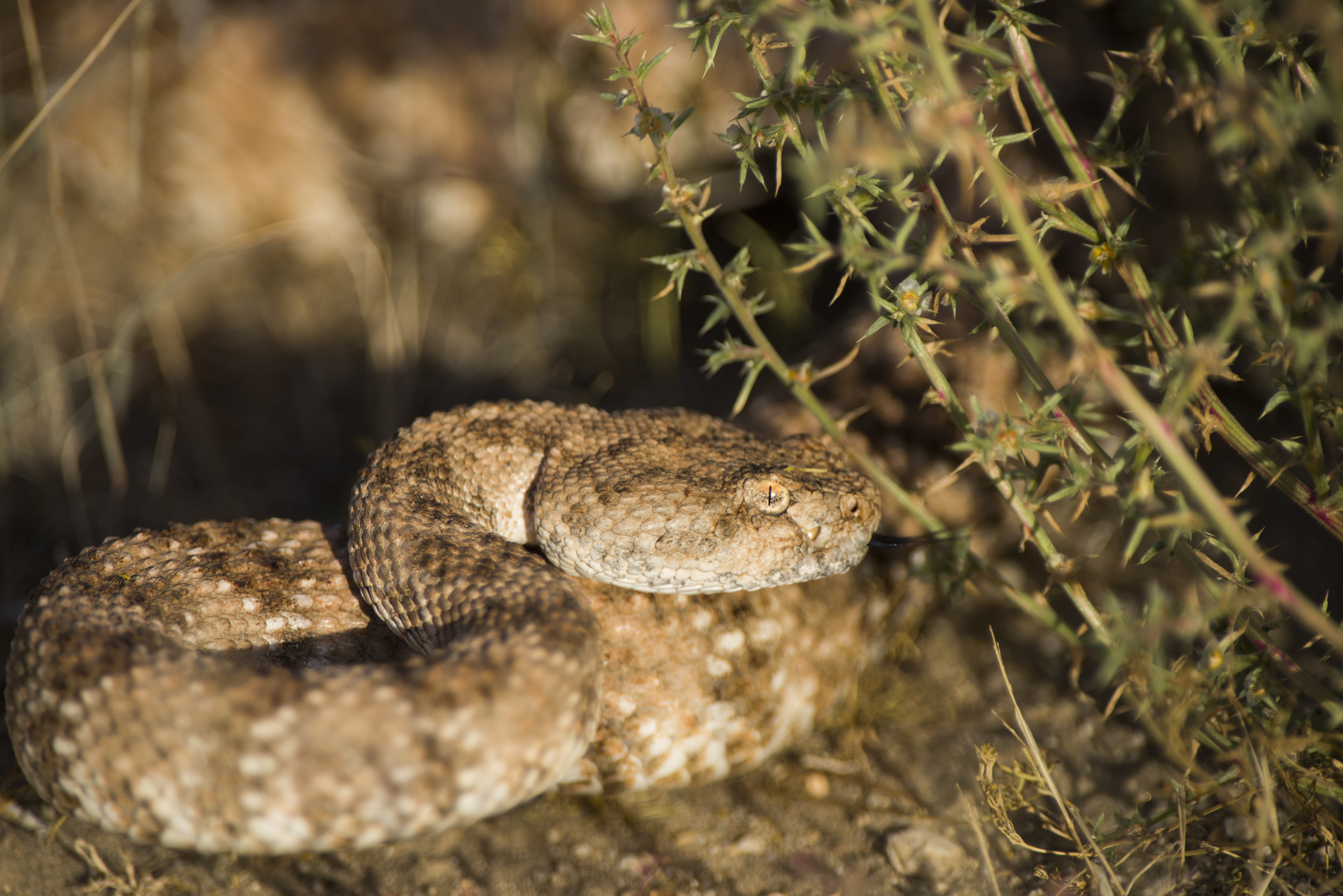
Speckled rattlesnake

- Blackneck garter snake (Thamnophis cyrtopsis)
- Coachwhip (Masticophis flagellum)
- Common chuckwalla (Sauromalus ater)
- Common kingsnake (Lampropeltis getula)
- Common side-blotched lizard (Uta stansburiana)
- Corn snake (Pantherophis guttatus or Elaphe guttata)
- Desert horned lizard / "horny toad" (Phrynosoma platyrhinos)
- Desert iguana (Dipsosaurus dorsalis)
- Desert night lizard (Xantusia vigilis)
- Desert spiny lizard (Sceloporus magister)
- Desert tortoise / "Mojave desert tortoise" (Gopherus agassizii)
- Eastern collared lizard (Crotaphytus collaris)
- Eastern fence lizard (Sceloporus undulatus)
- Eastern racer (Coluber constrictor)
- Gila monster (Heloderma suspectum)
- Glossy snake
  - A. e. eburnata
  - A. e. philipi
- Gopher snake (Pituophis catenifer)
  - P. c. deserticola
  - P. c. sayi ("bullsnake")
- Great Basin collared lizard (Crotaphytus bicinctores)
- Great Basin rattlesnake (Crotalus oreganus lutosus or Crotalus lutosus)
- Greater short-horned lizard / "Horny toad" (Phrynosoma hernandesi)
- Hopi rattlesnake (Crotalus viridis nuntius)
- Lesser earless lizard (Holbrookia maculata)
- Long-nosed leopard lizard (Gambelia wislizenii)
- Long-nosed snake (Rhinocheilus lecontei)
- Many-lined skink (Plestiodon multivirgatus)
- Midget faded rattlesnake (Crotalus oreganus concolor)
- Milk snake (Lampropeltis triangulum)
- Mojave rattlesnake (Crotalus scutulatus)
- New Mexico whiptail (Aspidoscelis neomexicanus)
- Night snake (Hypsiglena torquata)
- Ornate tree lizard (Urosaurus ornatus)
- Painted turtle (Chrysemys picta)
- Plateau striped whiptail (Aspidoscelis velox)
- Prairie rattlesnake (Crotalus viridis viridis)
- Ring-necked snake (Diadophis punctatus)
- Rubber boa (Charina bottae)
- Sagebrush lizard (Sceloporus graciosus)
- Sidewinder (Crotalus cerastes)
- Smith's black-headed snake (Tantilla hobartsmithi)
- Smooth green snake (Opheodrys vernalis)
- Snapping turtle (Chelydra serpentina) – not native, confirmed near St. George
- Sonoran mountain kingsnake (Lampropeltis pyromelana)
- Speckled rattlesnake (Crotalus mitchellii)
- Spiny softshell turtle (Apalone spinifera)
- Spotted leaf-nosed snake (Phyllorhynchus decurtatus)
- Striped whipsnake (Masticophis taeniatus)
- Valley garter snake (Thamnophis sirtalis fitchi)
- Western banded gecko (Coleonyx variegatus)
- Western fence lizard (Sceloporus occidentalis)
- Western ground snake (Sonora semiannulata)
- Western lyre snake (Trimorphodon biscutatus)
- Western patch-nosed snake (Salvadora hexalepis)
- Western skink (Eumeces skiltonianus or Plestiodon skiltonianus)
- Western terrestrial garter snake (Thamnophis elegans)
- Western threadsnake (Leptotyphlops humilis or Rena humilis)
- Western whiptail (Aspidoscelis tigris)
- Zebra-tailed lizard (Callisaurus draconoides)
