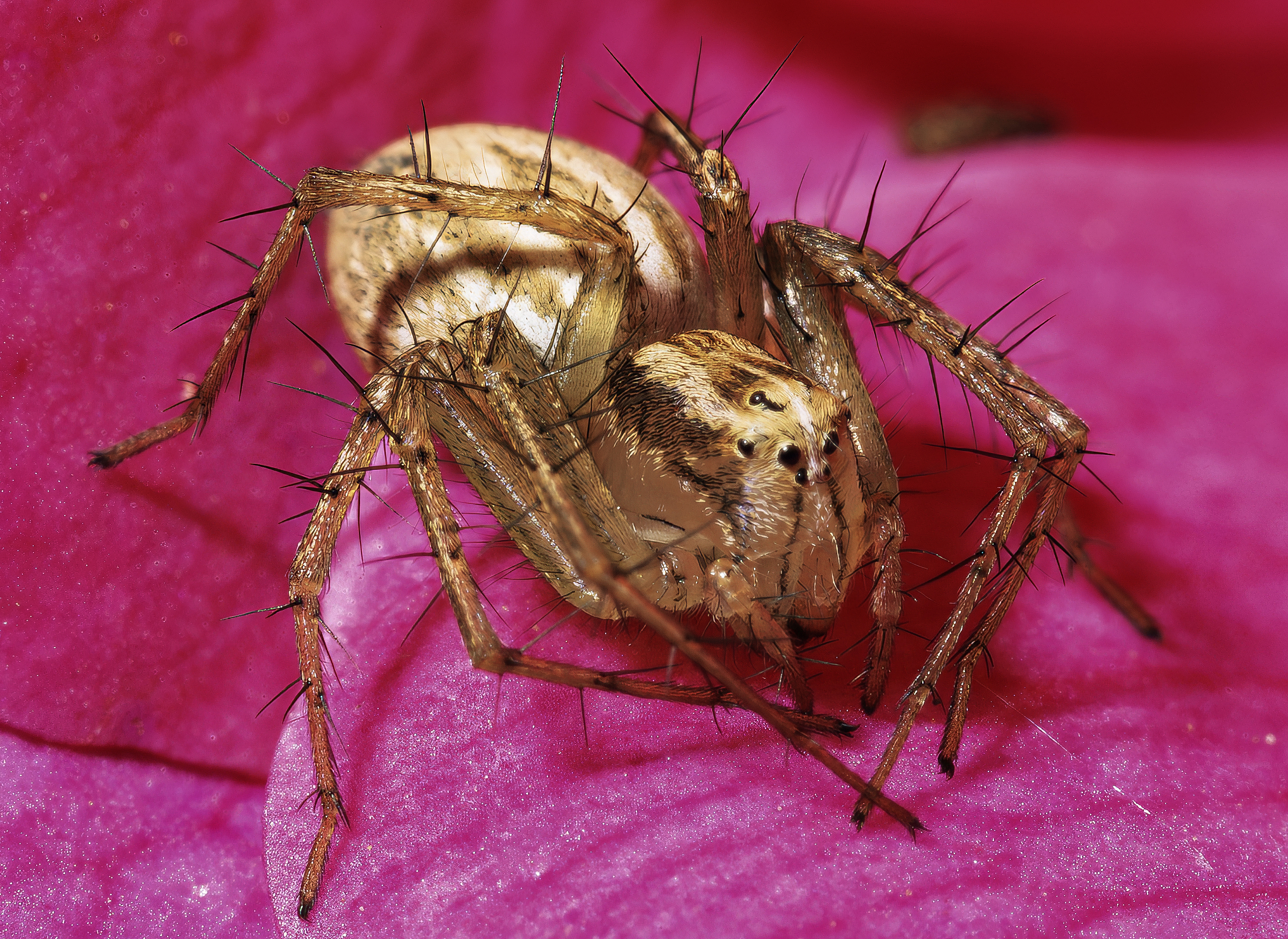

Scientific classification
- Kingdom: Animalia
- Phylum: Arthropoda
- Subphylum: Chelicerata
- Class: Arachnida
- Order: Araneae
- Infraorder: Araneomorphae
- Family: Oxyopidae
- Genus: Oxyopes
- Species: O. gracilipes

Binomial name
- Oxyopes gracilipes (White, 1849)

= Oxyopes gracilipes =

Species of arachnid

Oxyopes gracilipes is a species of lynx spider that is native to New Zealand and Australia.

== Taxonomy ==
Oxyopes gracilipes was first described in 1849 as Sphasus gracilipes. The species was described again in 1878 as Oxyopes elegans. In 1885, Arthur Urquhart described the spider again as Sphasus gregarius. In 1892, Urquhart moved S. gregarius to the Oxyopes genus. In 1998, S. gracilipes was moved to the Oxyopes genus and O. gregarius was recognized as a synonym of this species.
