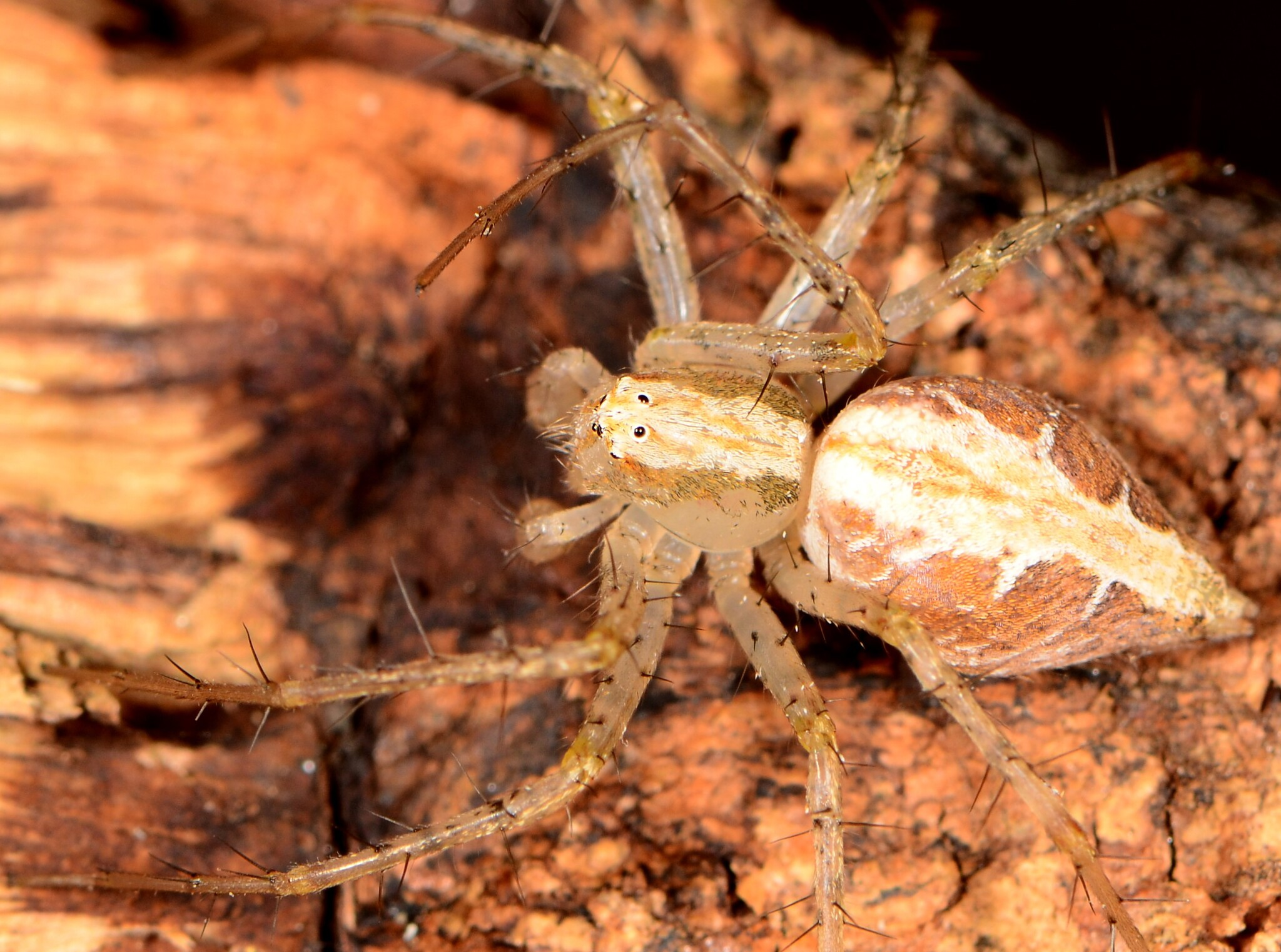
- juvenile male
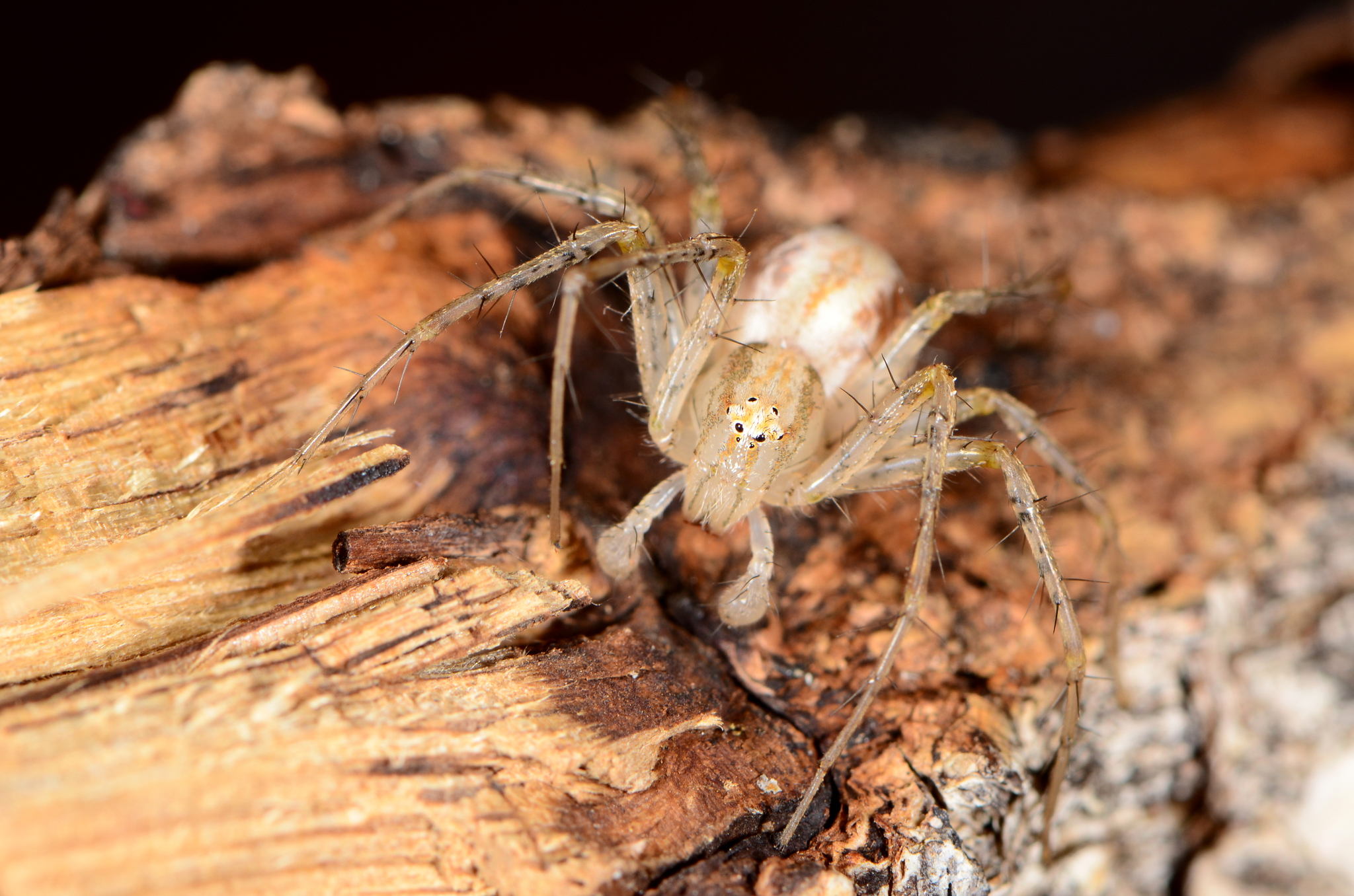
- juvenile male

Scientific classification
- Kingdom: Animalia
- Phylum: Arthropoda
- Subphylum: Chelicerata
- Class: Arachnida
- Order: Araneae
- Infraorder: Araneomorphae
- Family: Oxyopidae
- Genus: Oxyopes
- Species: O. falconeri

Binomial name
- Oxyopes falconeri Lessert, 1915

= Oxyopes falconeri =

Banded Face Lynx Spider

Species of spider

Oxyopes falconeri is a species of spider in the family Oxyopidae. It is commonly known as the banded face lynx spider.

== Distribution ==
Oxyopes falconeri occurs in Tanzania, Namibia, Botswana, Zimbabwe, and South Africa. In South Africa, the species has been recorded from two provinces at altitudes ranging from 254 to 1,341 m above sea level.

== Habitat and ecology ==
The species is commonly found on grasses in the Savanna biome. It appears to be well-established in the grassland habitats of the savanna regions.

== Description ==
Oxyopes falconeri is known from both sexes. The species displays the typical lynx spider characteristics including long, slender legs with prominent spines and a characteristic tapering opisthosoma.

== Conservation ==
Oxyopes falconeri is listed as Least Concern by the South African National Biodiversity Institute due to its wide distribution across southern Africa. The species is protected in Blouberg Nature Reserve, Lhuvhondo Nature Reserve, and Kruger National Park.
