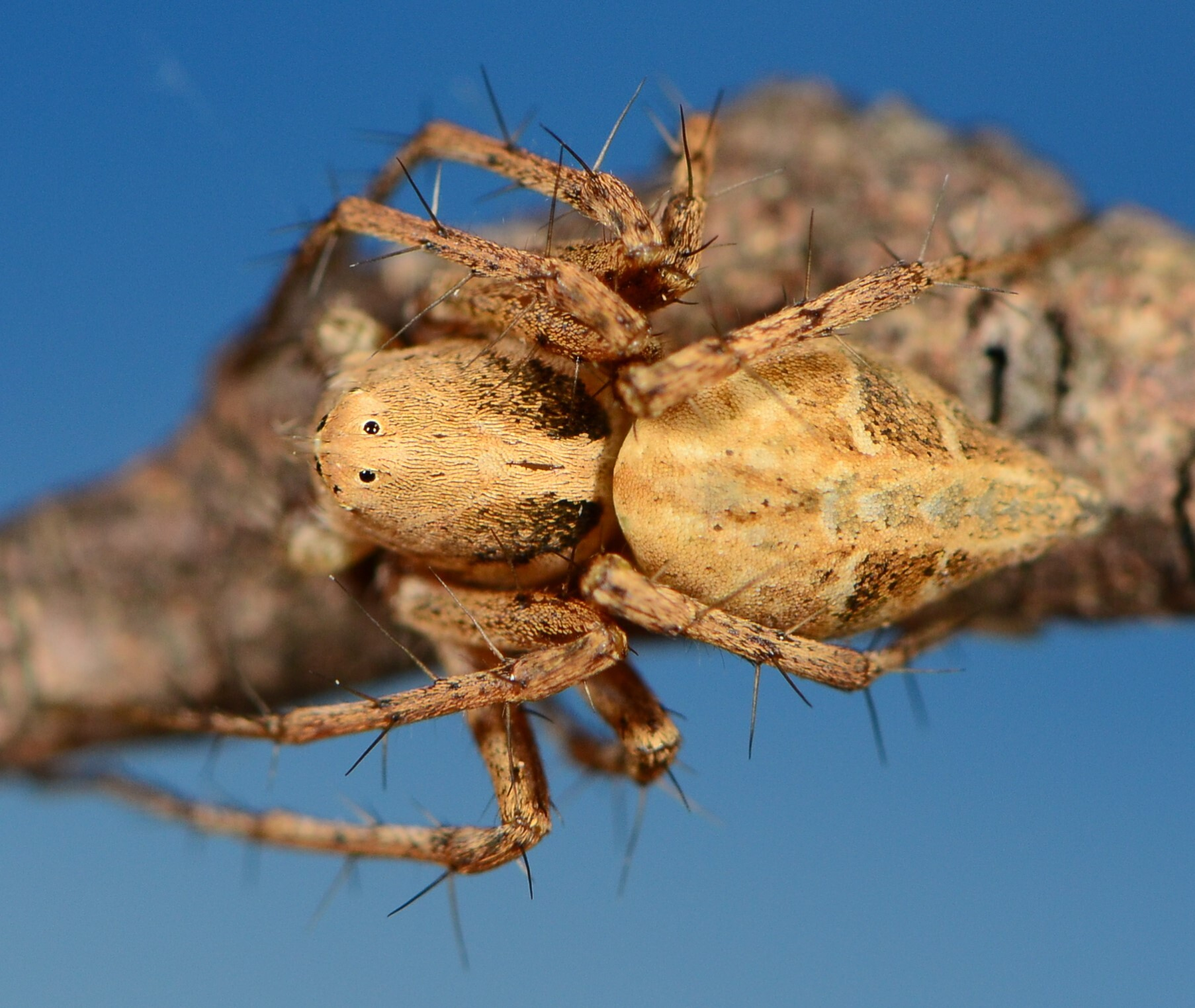
- female
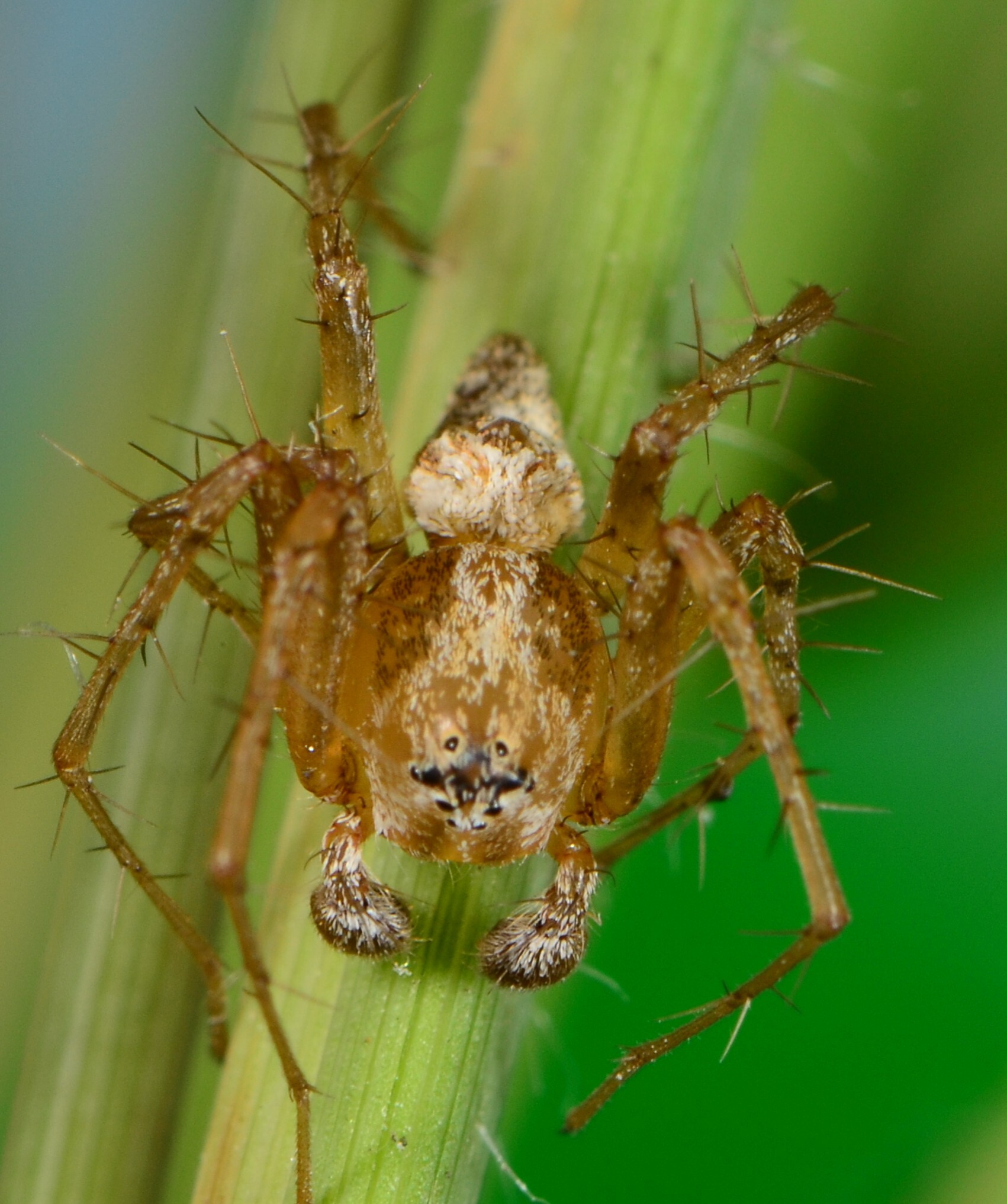
- male

Scientific classification
- Kingdom: Animalia
- Phylum: Arthropoda
- Subphylum: Chelicerata
- Class: Arachnida
- Order: Araneae
- Infraorder: Araneomorphae
- Family: Oxyopidae
- Genus: Oxyopes
- Species: O. hoggi

Binomial name
- Oxyopes hoggi Lessert, 1915

= Oxyopes hoggi =

Scaly-head Lynx Spider

Species of spider

Oxyopes hoggi is a species of spider in the family Oxyopidae. It is commonly known as the scaly-head lynx spider.

== Distribution ==
Oxyopes hoggi occurs in Tanzania, Angola, Zimbabwe, and South Africa. In South Africa, the species has been recorded from eight provinces at altitudes ranging from 33 to 1,698 m above sea level.

== Habitat and ecology ==
The species is commonly found on grasses across multiple biomes including Fynbos, Grassland, Nama Karoo, and Savanna biomes. It has also been sampled from pistachio orchards, demonstrating its adaptability to agricultural environments.

== Description ==
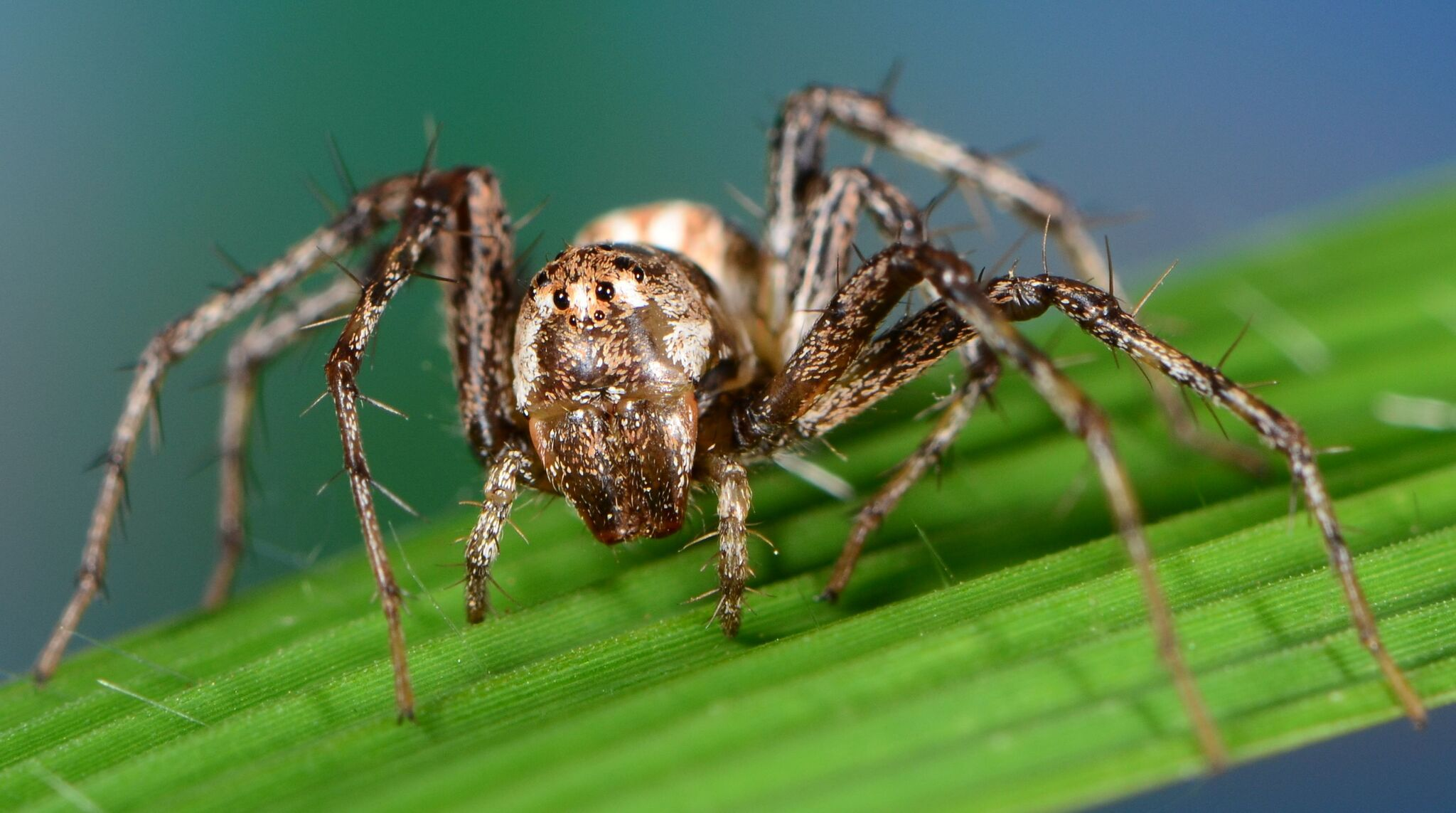
female

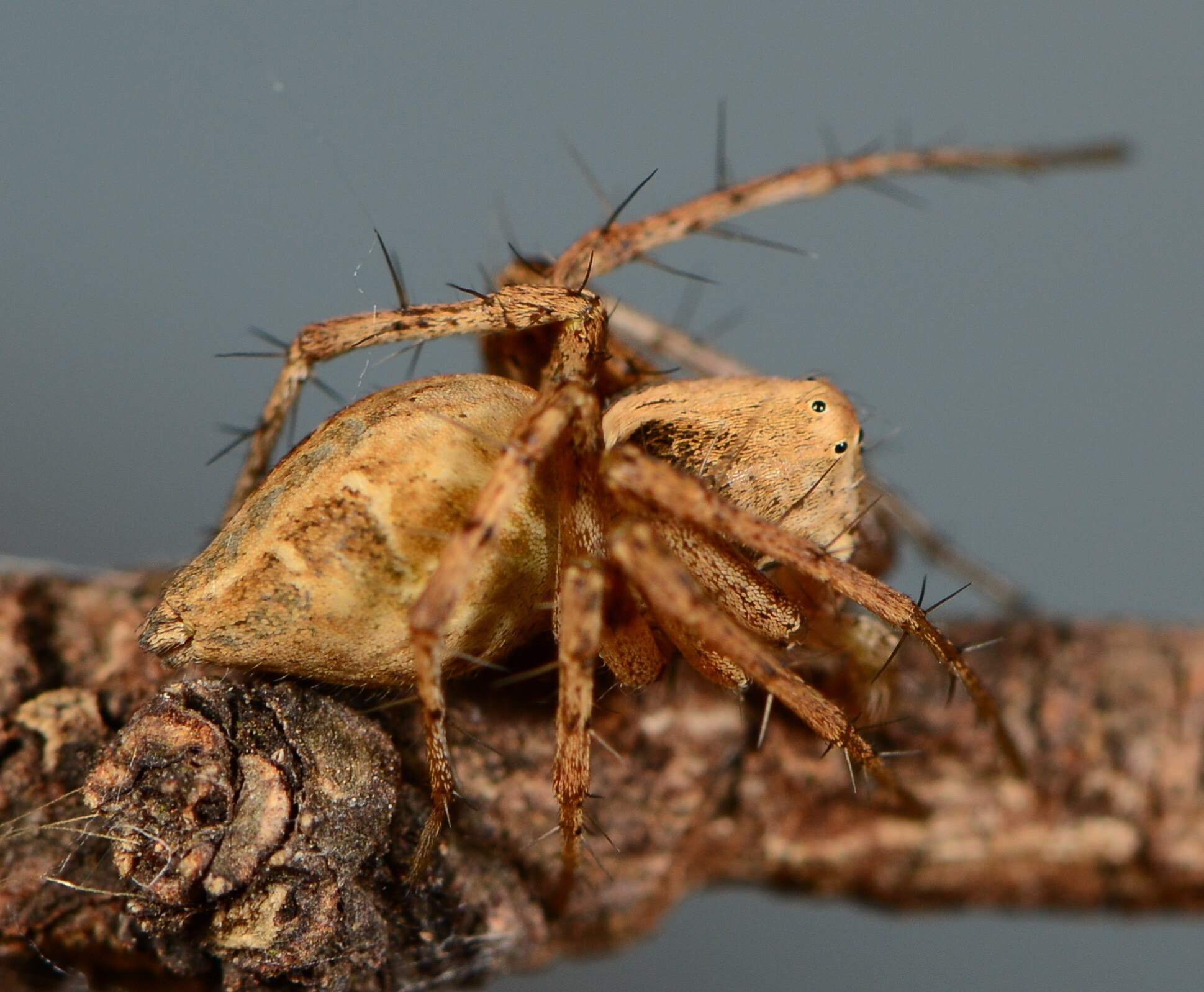
female

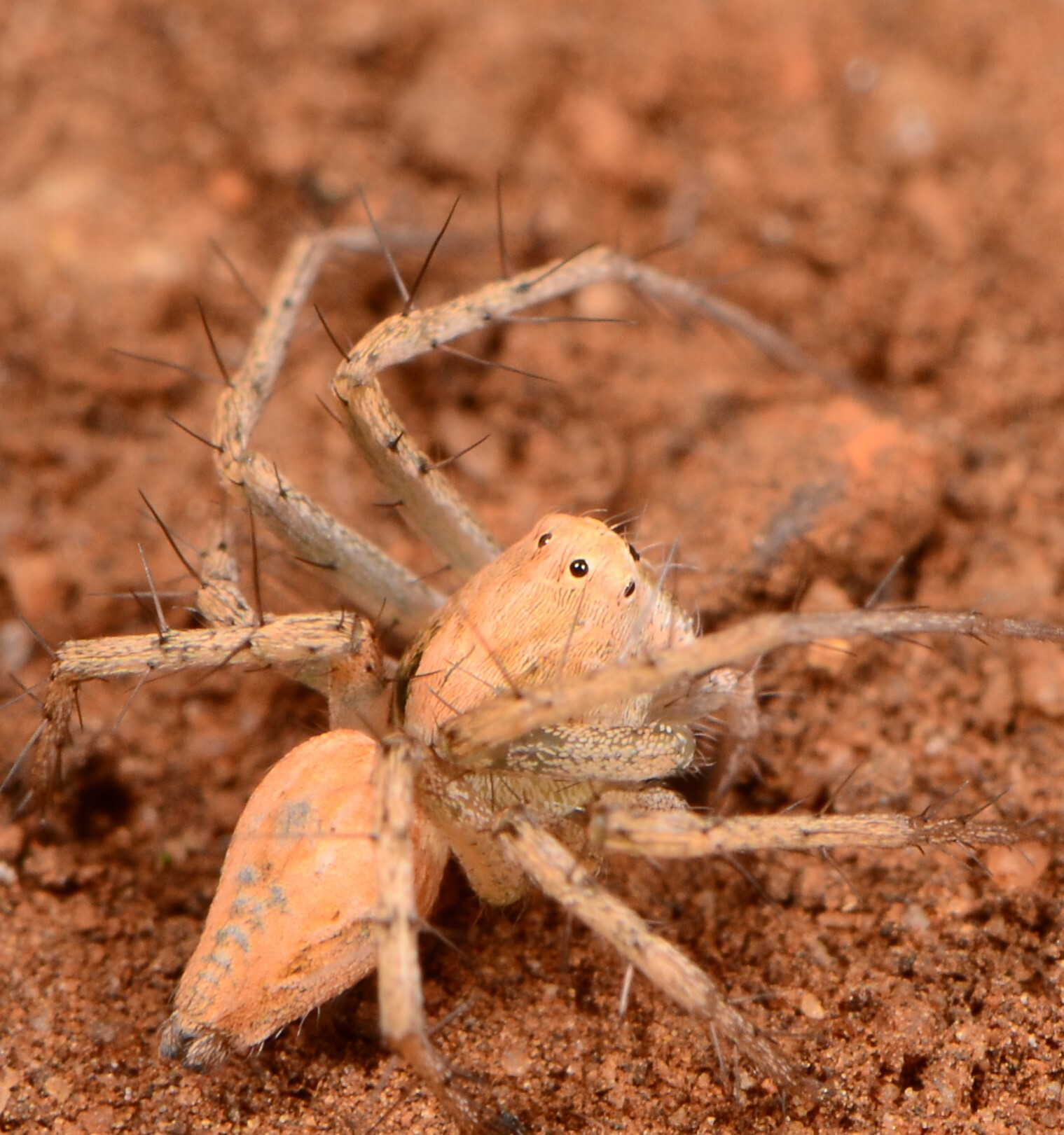
juvenile female

Oxyopes hoggi is known from both sexes. The species exhibits the characteristic Oxyopes spider morphology with long, slender legs bearing prominent spines and a tapering opisthosoma.

== Conservation ==
Oxyopes hoggi is listed as Least Concern by the South African National Biodiversity Institute due to its wide geographic range across multiple African countries and provinces. The species is protected in more than twelve protected areas and faces no significant threats.
