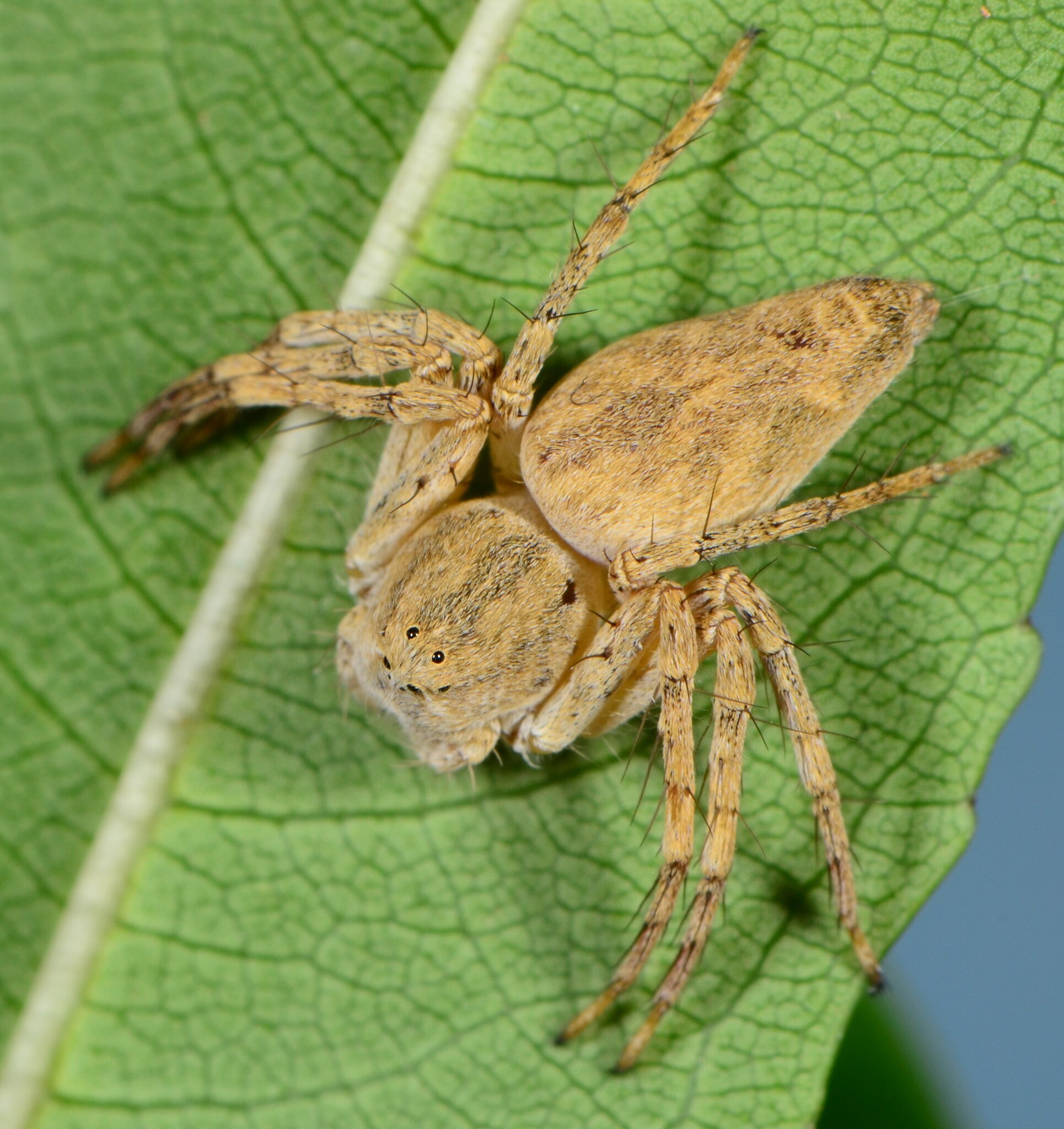
- female
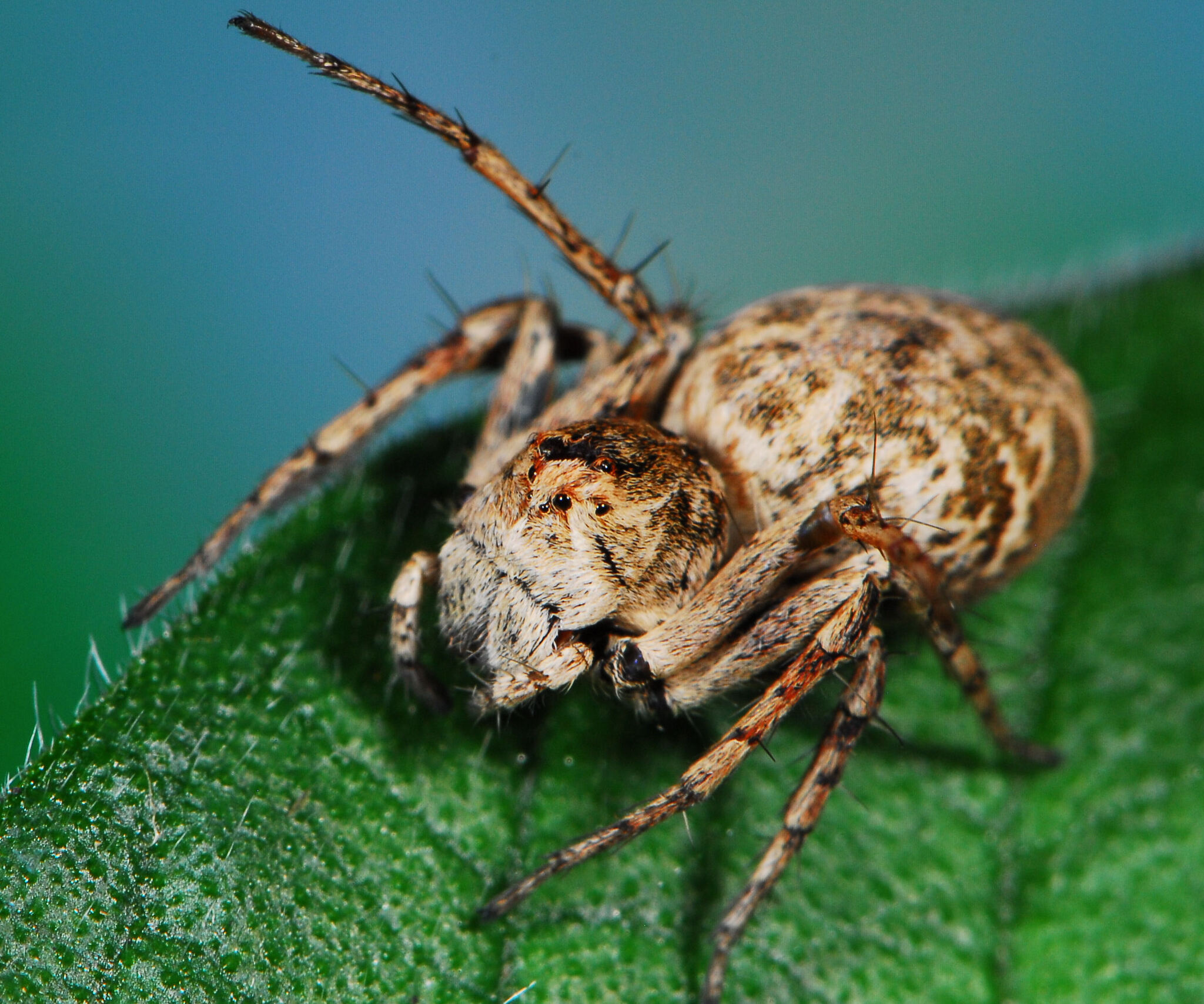
- female

Scientific classification
- Kingdom: Animalia
- Phylum: Arthropoda
- Subphylum: Chelicerata
- Class: Arachnida
- Order: Araneae
- Infraorder: Araneomorphae
- Family: Oxyopidae
- Genus: Oxyopes
- Species: O. schenkeli

Binomial name
- Oxyopes schenkeli Lessert, 1927

= Oxyopes schenkeli =

Ring-headed Lynx Spider

Species of spider

Oxyopes schenkeli is a species of spider in the family Oxyopidae. It is commonly known as the ring-headed lynx spider.

== Distribution ==
Oxyopes schenkeli occurs in the Democratic Republic of the Congo, Uganda, Botswana, Zimbabwe, and South Africa. In South Africa, the species has been recorded from six provinces.

== Habitat and ecology ==
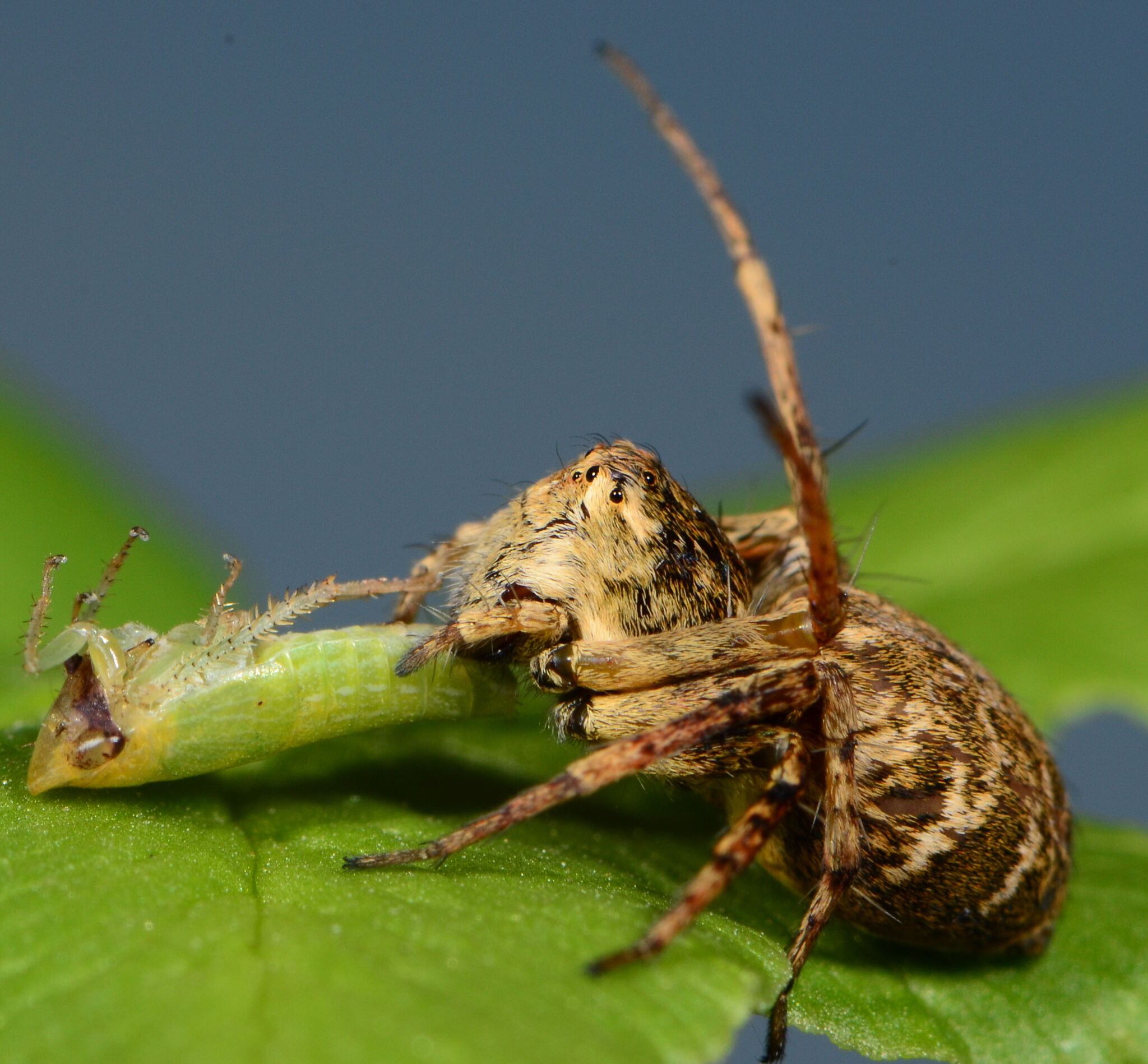

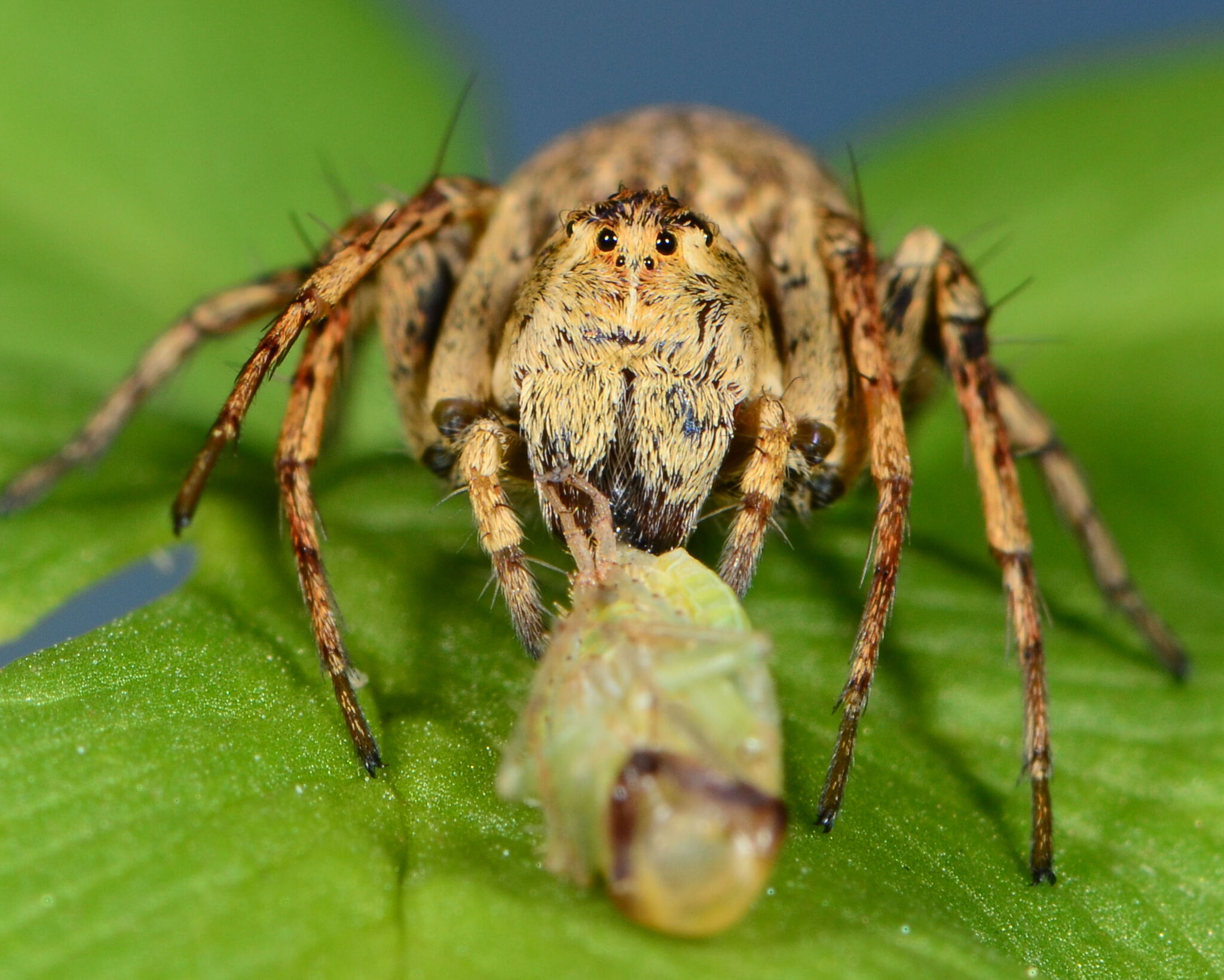

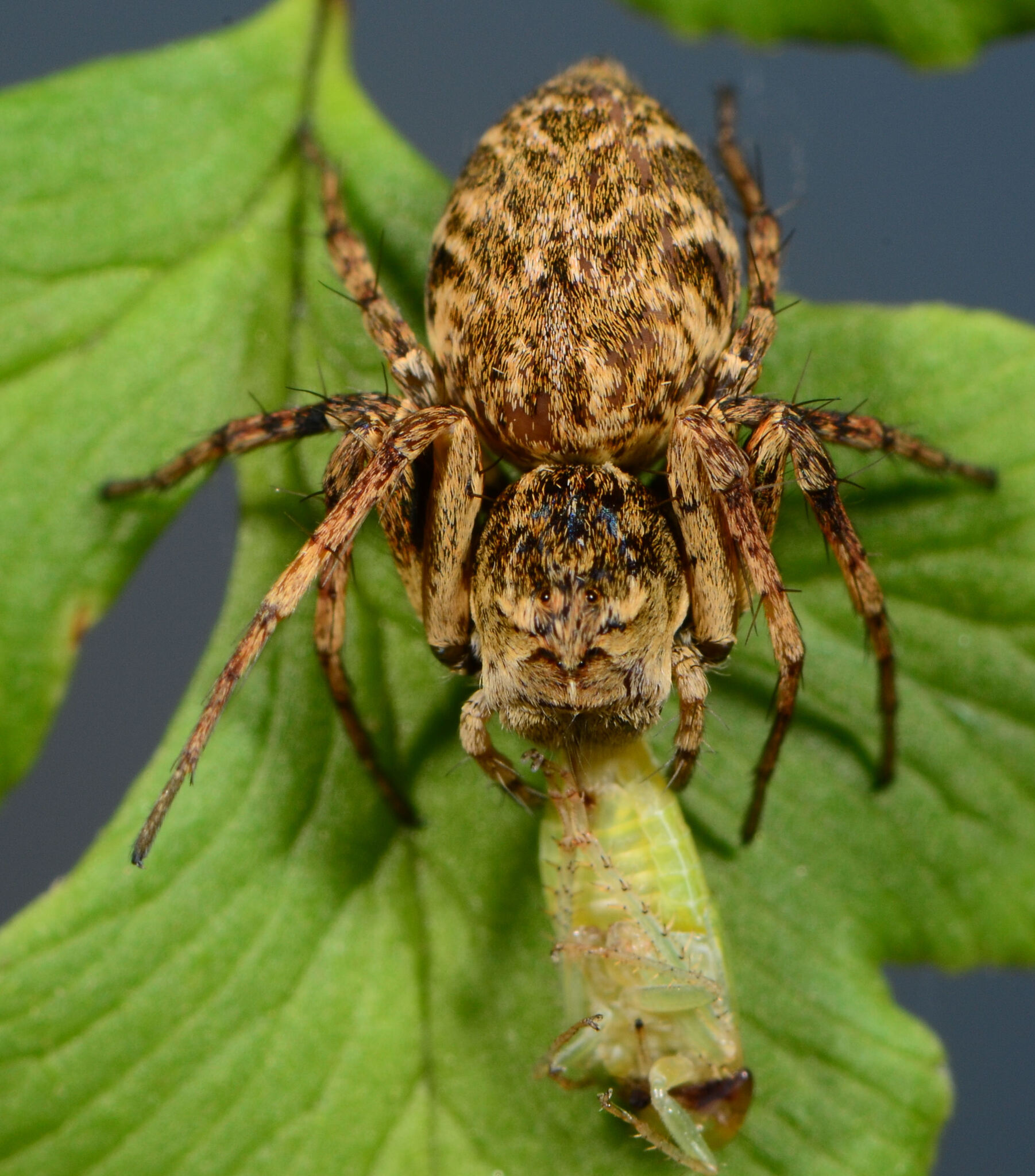

Oxyopes schenkeli is commonly found on grasses across multiple biomes including Grassland, Nama Karoo, and Savanna biomes at altitudes ranging from 93 to 1,735 m above sea level. It has also been sampled from various agricultural crops including avocado, citrus, and macadamia orchards, demonstrating adaptability to agricultural environments.

== Description ==
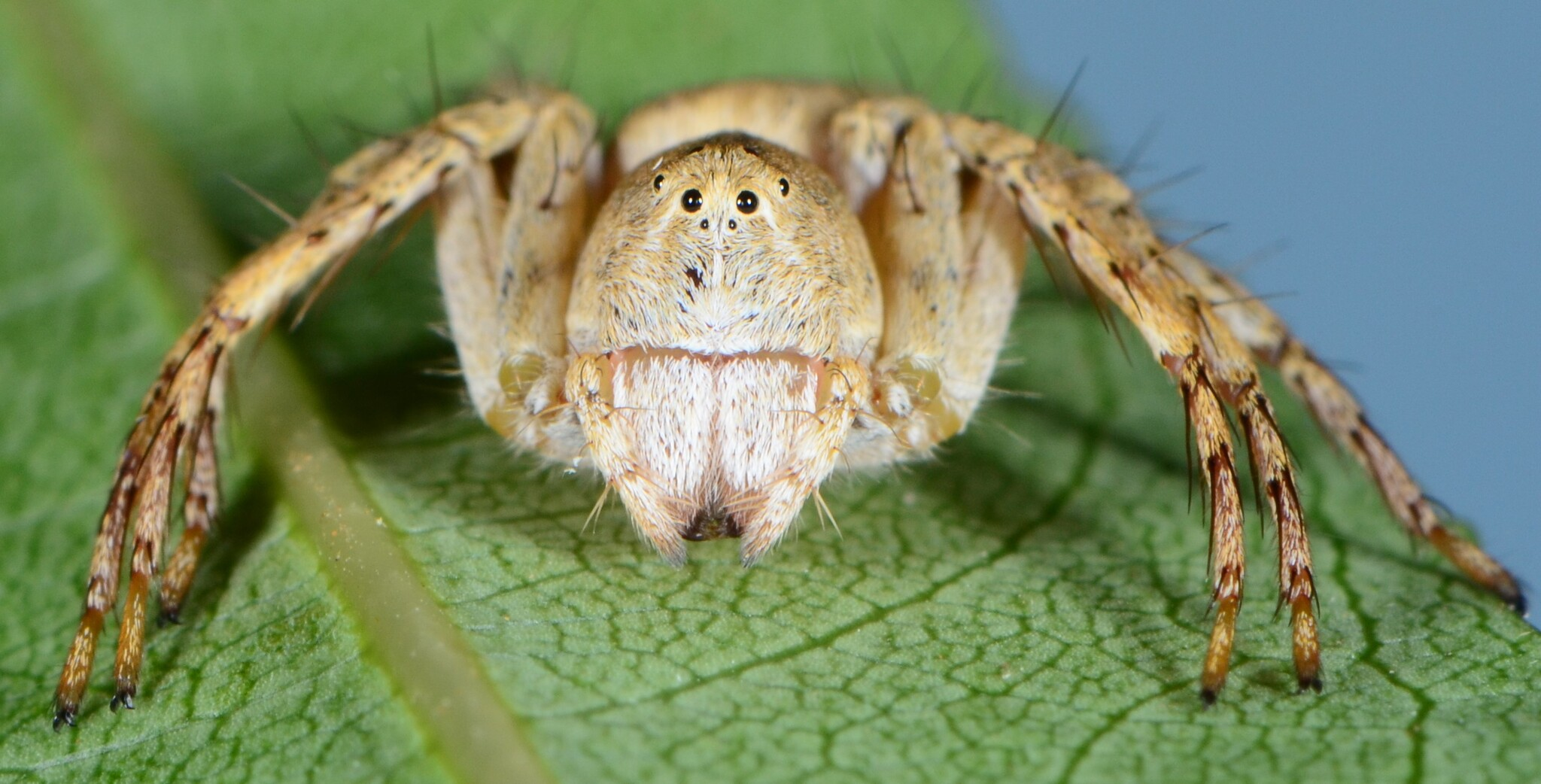

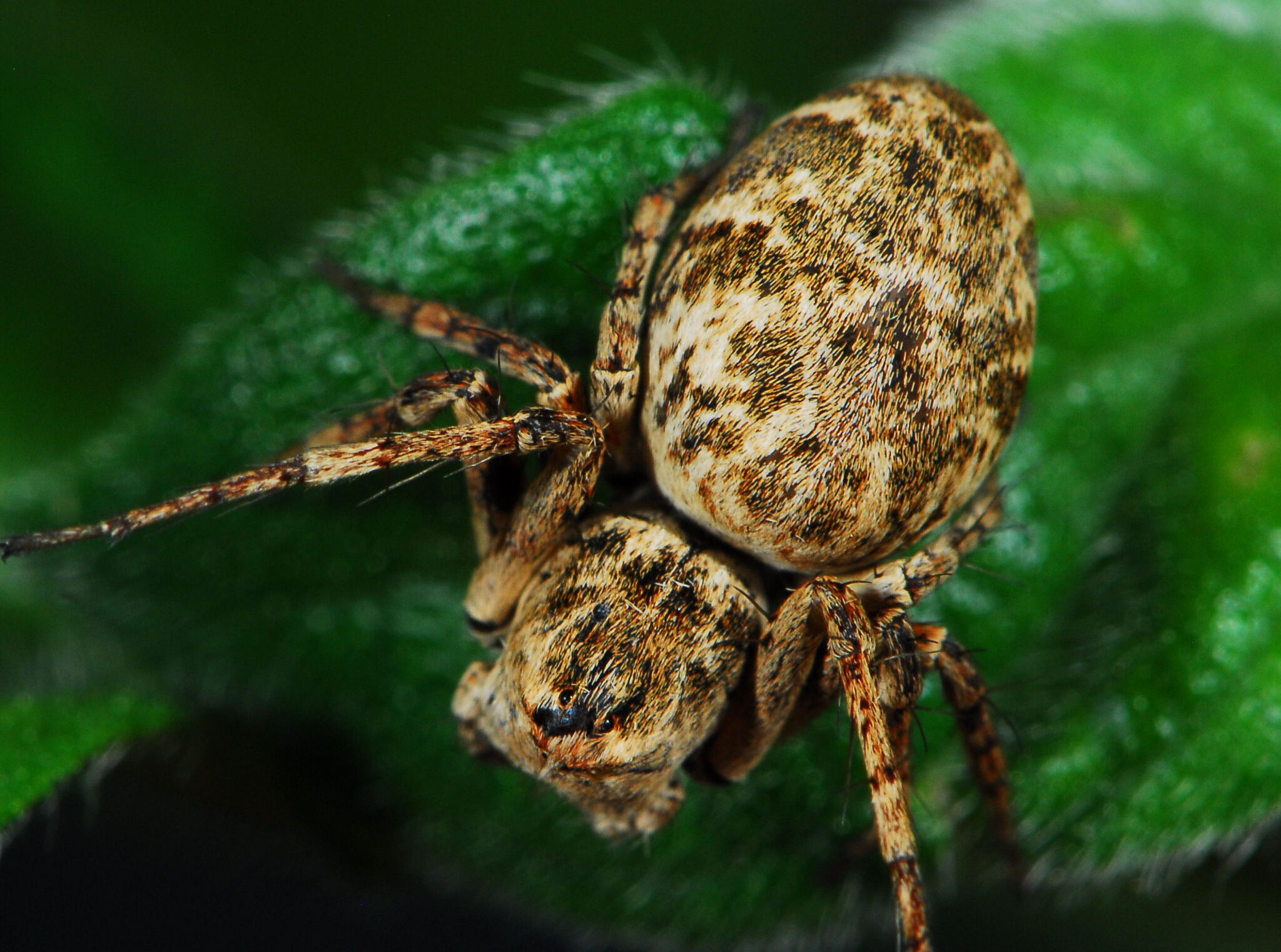

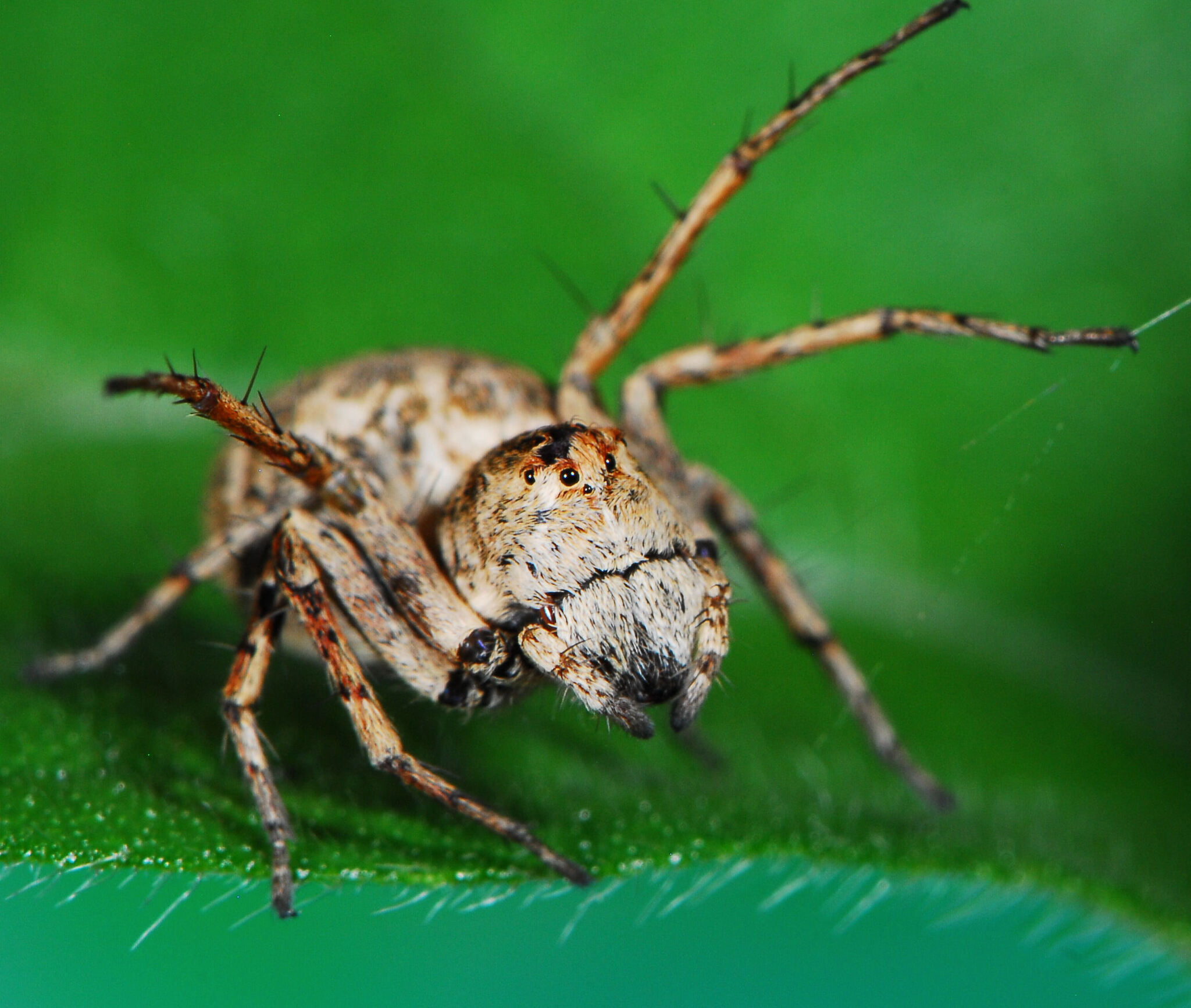

== Etymology ==
The species is named after Swiss arachnologist Ehrenfried Schenkel-Haas.

== Conservation ==
Oxyopes schenkeli is listed as Least Concern by the South African National Biodiversity Institute due to its wide geographic range across multiple African countries. The species is protected in more than ten protected areas and faces no significant threats.
