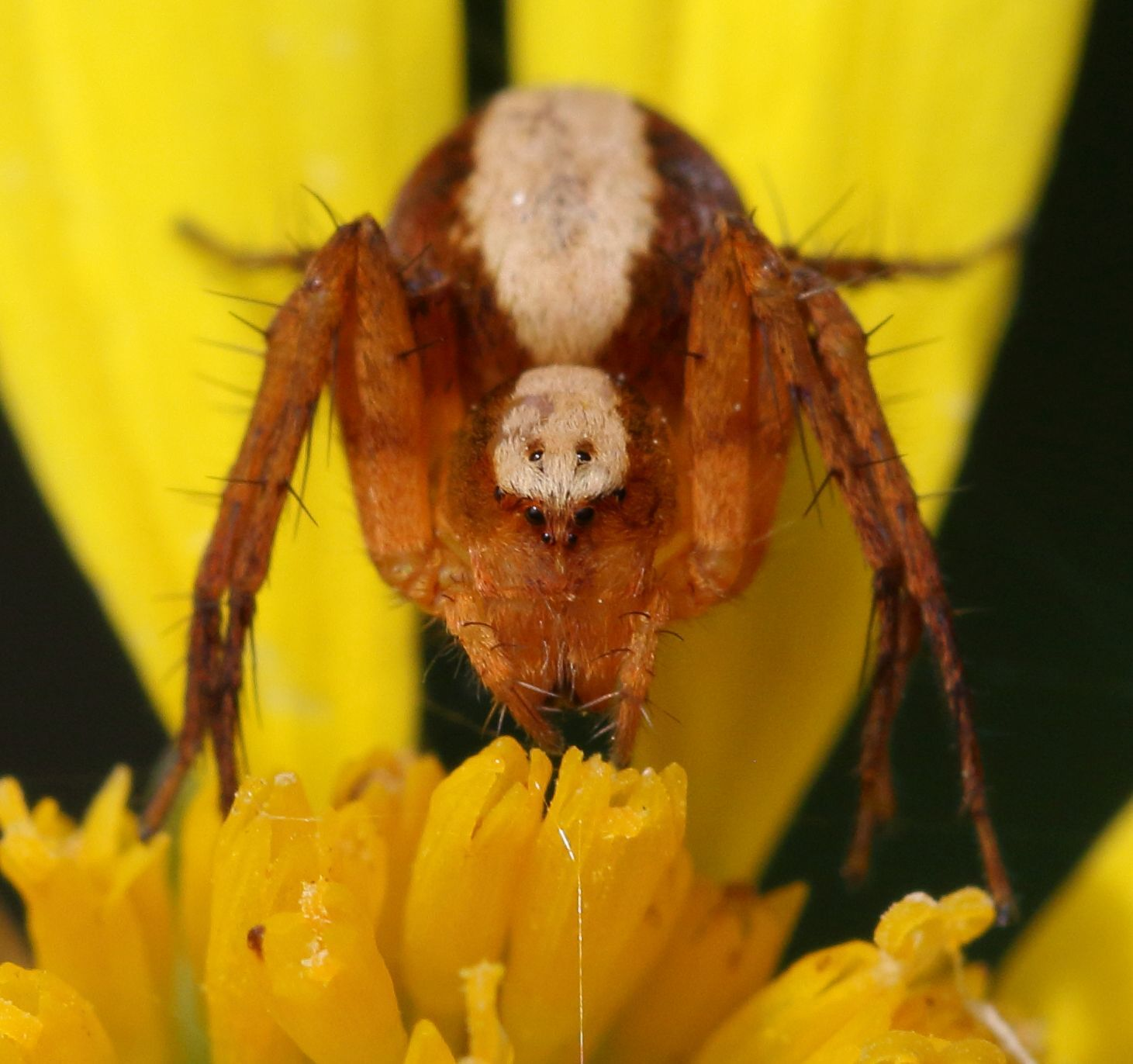

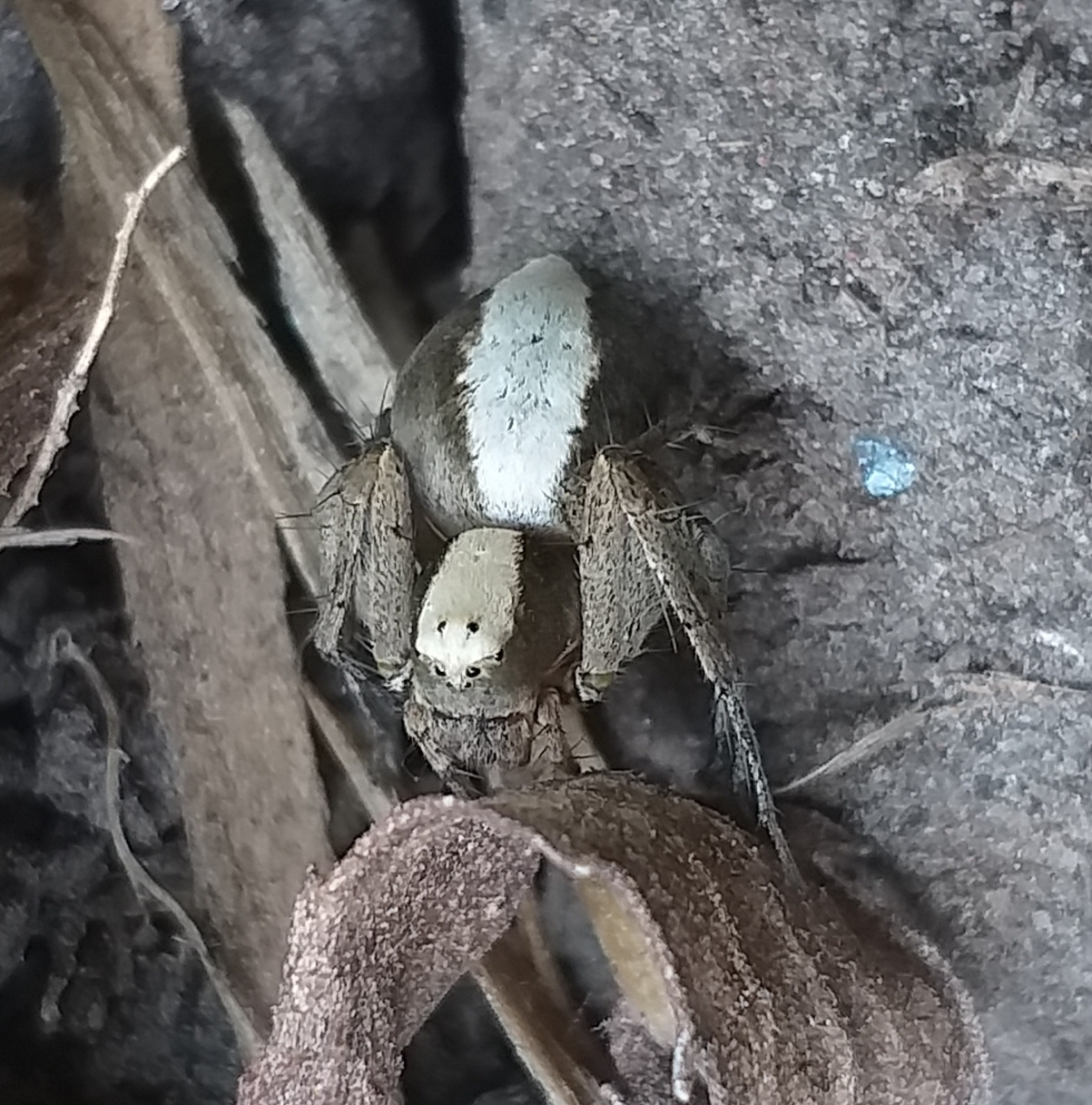

Scientific classification
- Kingdom: Animalia
- Phylum: Arthropoda
- Subphylum: Chelicerata
- Class: Arachnida
- Order: Araneae
- Infraorder: Araneomorphae
- Family: Oxyopidae
- Genus: Oxyopes
- Species: O. singularis

Binomial name
- Oxyopes singularis Lessert, 1927

= Oxyopes singularis =

Zaire Lynx Spider

Species of spider

Oxyopes singularis is a species of spider in the family Oxyopidae. It is commonly known as the Zaire lynx spider.

The species' syntypes, consisting of one male and one female specimen, are held by the Natural History Museum of Geneva.

== Distribution ==
Oxyopes singularis occurs in the Democratic Republic of the Congo, Namibia, Zimbabwe, and South Africa. In South Africa, the species is known from two provinces at altitudes ranging from 140 to 582 m above sea level.

== Habitat and ecology ==
The species has been found on grasses in the Savanna biome. Due to its limited collection records in South Africa, more research is needed to fully understand its habitat preferences.

== Description ==
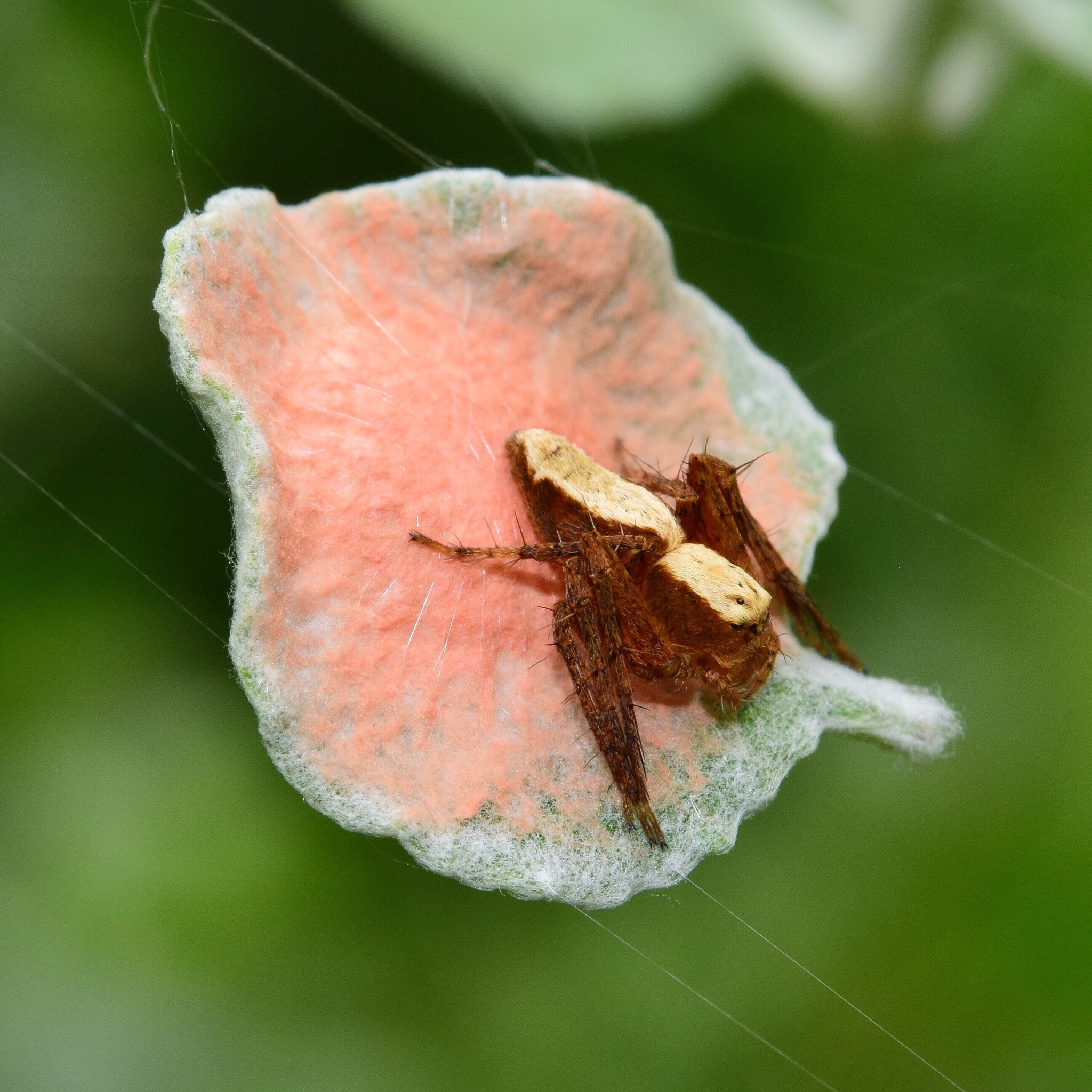

Oxyopes singularis is known from both sexes. The species is characterized by a black-brown opisthosoma with varied testaceous coloring and a white longitudinal center line above.

== Conservation ==
Oxyopes singularis is listed as Least Concern by the South African National Biodiversity Institute due to its wide geographic range across multiple African countries. The species is protected in Ndumo Game Reserve and Venetia Limpopo Valley Reserve.
