= Oxyopes sjostedti =

Sjostedt's Lynx Spider

Conservation status
- Least Concern (SANBI Red List)

Scientific classification
- Kingdom: Animalia
- Phylum: Arthropoda
- Subphylum: Chelicerata
- Class: Arachnida
- Order: Araneae
- Infraorder: Araneomorphae
- Family: Oxyopidae
- Genus: Oxyopes
- Species: O. sjostedti

Binomial name
- Oxyopes sjostedti Lessert, 1915

Species of spider

Oxyopes sjostedti is a species of spider in the family Oxyopidae. It is commonly known as Sjostedt's lynx spider.

== Etymology ==
The species is named after Yngve Sjöstedt, who led the Swedish zoological mission to Kilimanjaro and Mount Meru (1905-1906) during which the type specimens were collected.

== Distribution ==
Oxyopes sjostedti occurs in Ethiopia, Tanzania, and South Africa. In South Africa, the species has been recorded from two provinces at altitudes ranging from 140 to 866 metres above sea level.

== Habitat and ecology ==
The species has been found on grasses in the Savanna biome. Due to limited collection records, more research is needed to fully understand its ecological preferences and habitat requirements.

== Description ==
Oxyopes sjostedti is known only from males.

== Conservation ==
Oxyopes sjostedti is listed as Least Concern by the South African National Biodiversity Institute due to its wide geographic range across three African countries. The species is protected in Ndumo Game Reserve and faces no significant threats.
