= Oxyopes vanderysti =

Vanderyst's Lynx Spider

Conservation status
- Least Concern (SANBI Red List)

Scientific classification
- Kingdom: Animalia
- Phylum: Arthropoda
- Subphylum: Chelicerata
- Class: Arachnida
- Order: Araneae
- Infraorder: Araneomorphae
- Family: Oxyopidae
- Genus: Oxyopes
- Species: O. vanderysti

Binomial name
- Oxyopes vanderysti Lessert, 1946

Species of spider

Oxyopes vanderysti is a species of spider in the family Oxyopidae. It is commonly known as Vanderyst's lynx spider. It was first described in 1946 by Roger de Lessert.

== Distribution ==
Oxyopes vanderysti occurs in the Democratic Republic of the Congo and South Africa. In South Africa, the species has been recorded from two provinces at altitudes ranging from 1,202 to 1,303 metres above sea level.

== Habitat and ecology ==
The species has been found on grasses in both Grassland and Savanna biomes.

== Description ==
Oxyopes vanderysti is known only from males.

== Conservation ==
Oxyopes vanderysti is listed as Least Concern by the South African National Biodiversity Institute due to its wide geographic range across Africa. Despite the limited collection records, the large distance between known localities suggests the species may be under-collected.
