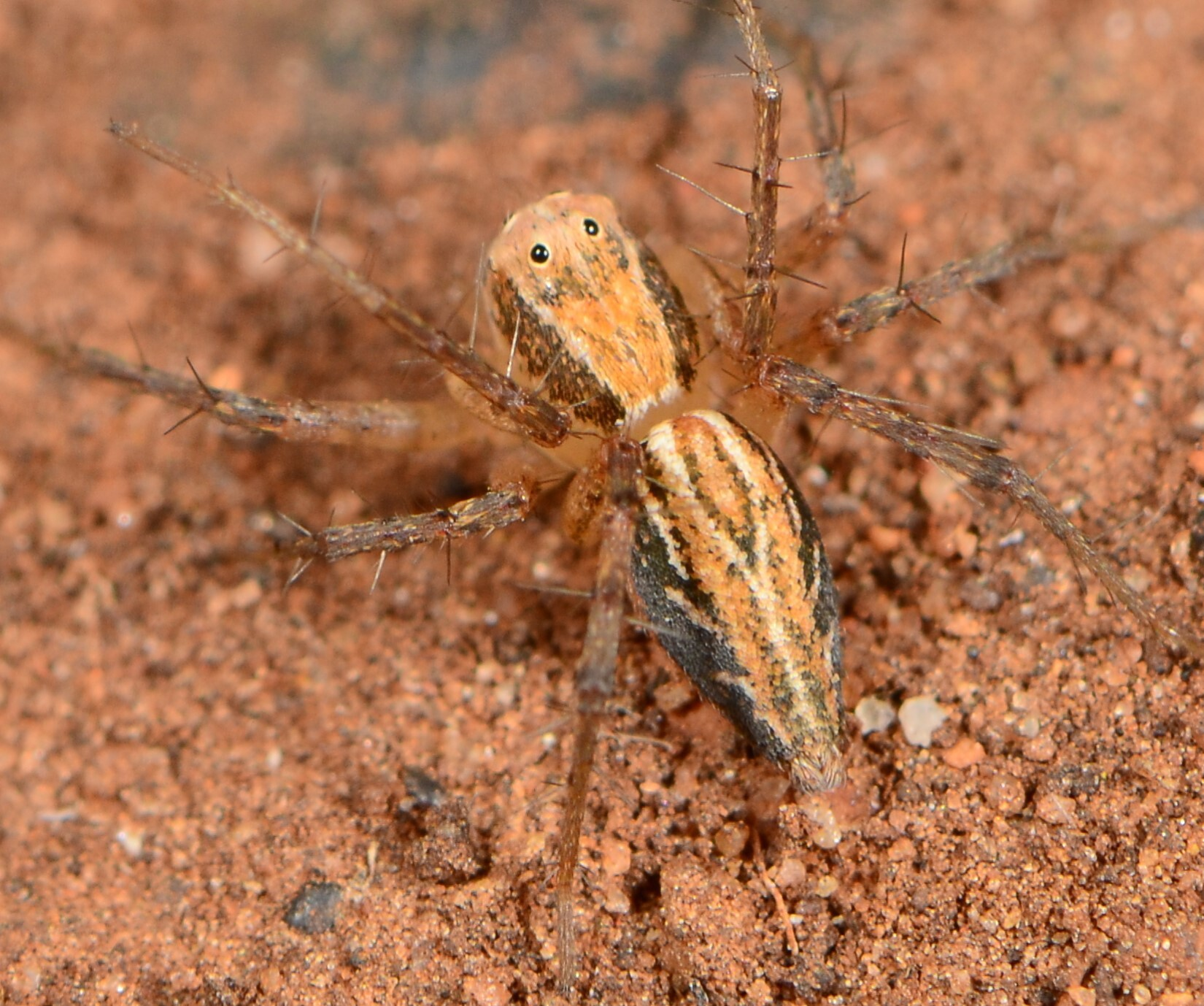
- female
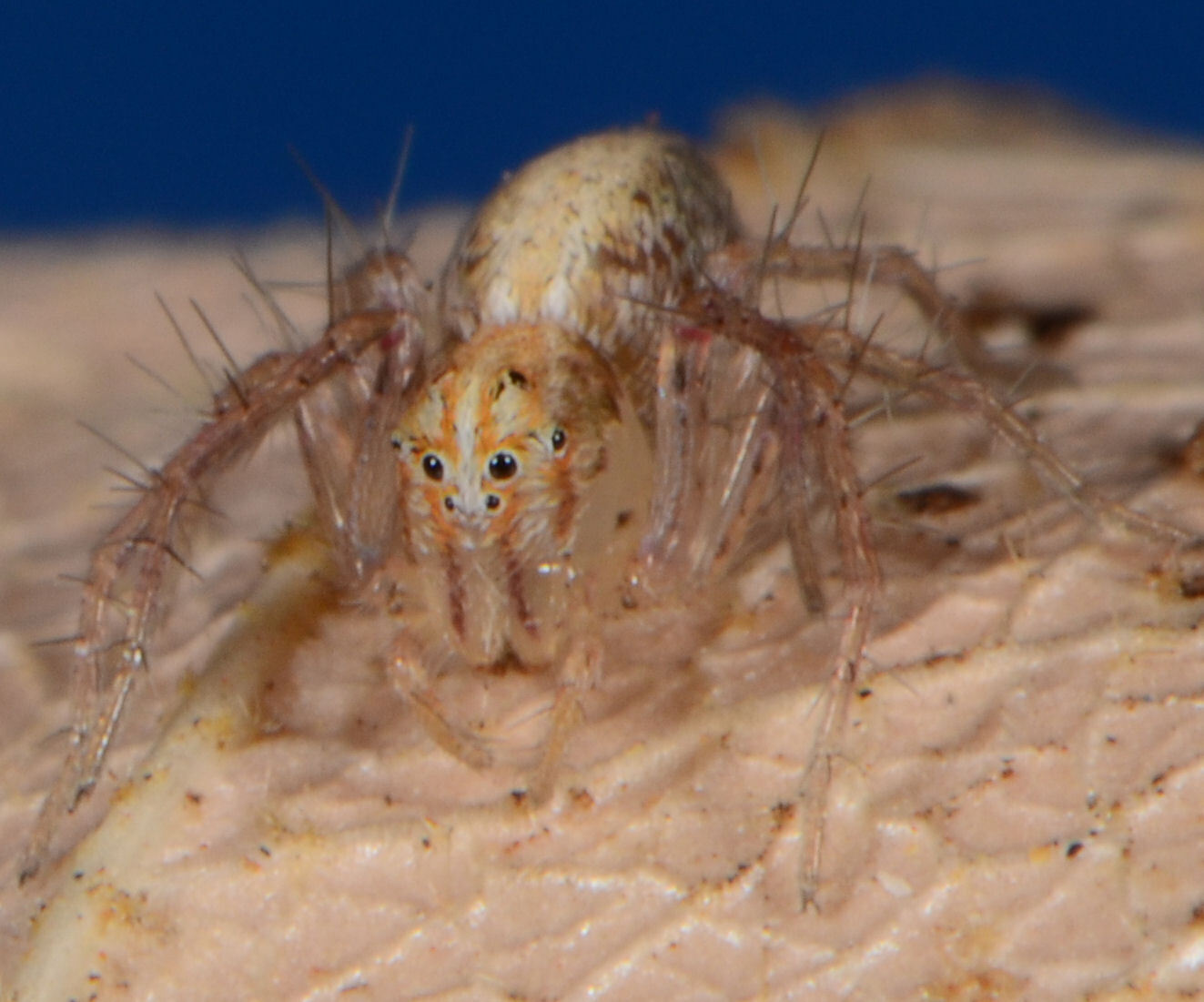
- female

Scientific classification
- Kingdom: Animalia
- Phylum: Arthropoda
- Subphylum: Chelicerata
- Class: Arachnida
- Order: Araneae
- Infraorder: Araneomorphae
- Family: Oxyopidae
- Genus: Oxyopes
- Species: O. affinis

Binomial name
- Oxyopes affinis Lessert, 1915

= Oxyopes affinis =

Tanzania Lynx Spider

Species of spider

Oxyopes affinis is a species of spider in the family Oxyopidae. It is commonly known as the Tanzania lynx spider.

== Distribution ==
Oxyopes affinis occurs in Democratic Republic of the Congo, Tanzania, Mozambique, and South Africa. In South Africa, the species has been recorded from seven provinces at altitudes ranging from 29 to 1,601 m above sea level.

== Habitat and ecology ==
The species is commonly found on grasses and has been recorded from multiple biomes including Fynbos, Grassland, Savanna, Nama Karoo, and Indian Ocean Coastal Belt biomes. It is considered a common species that has been sampled from grass in various habitats.

== Description ==
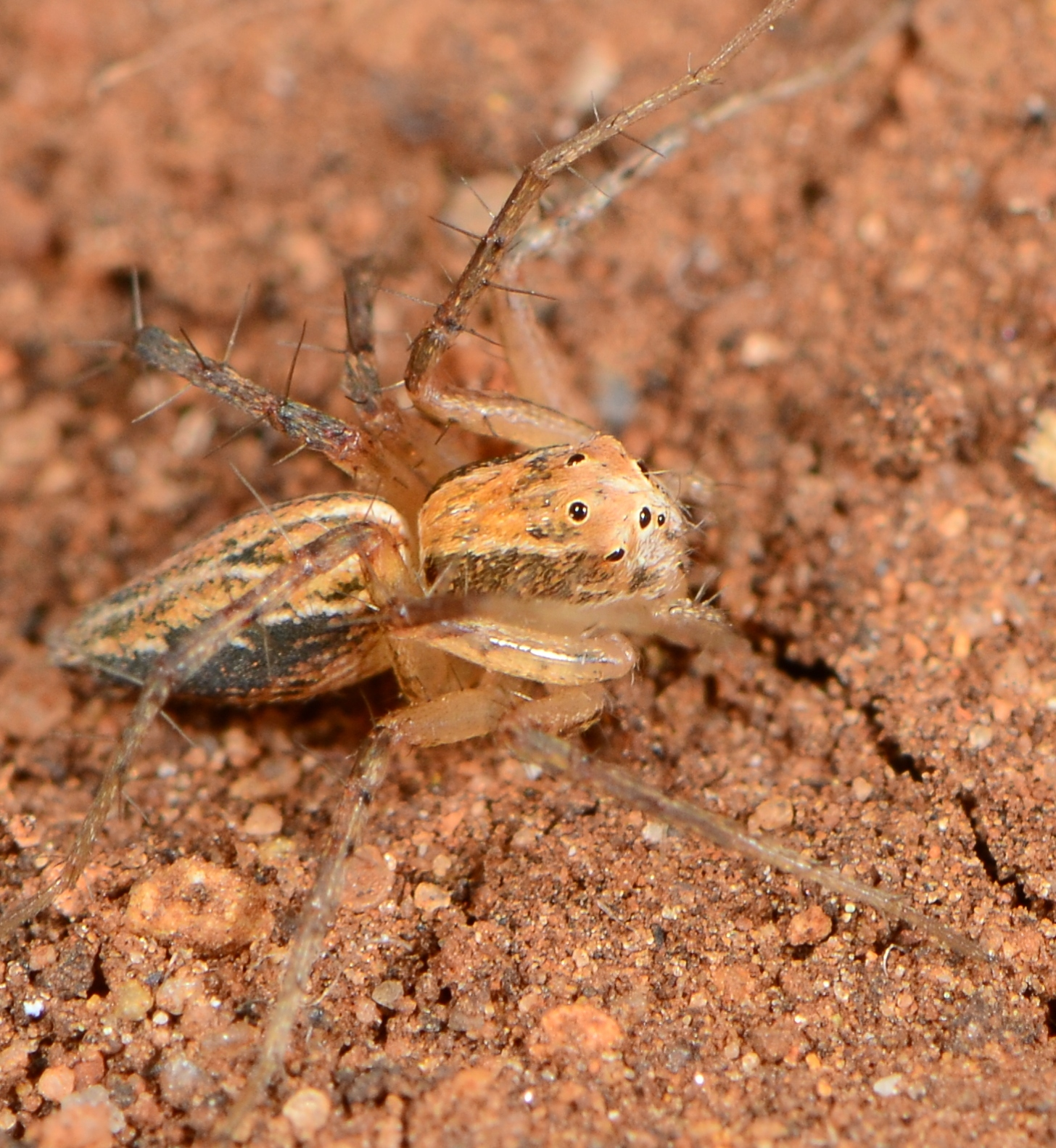
female

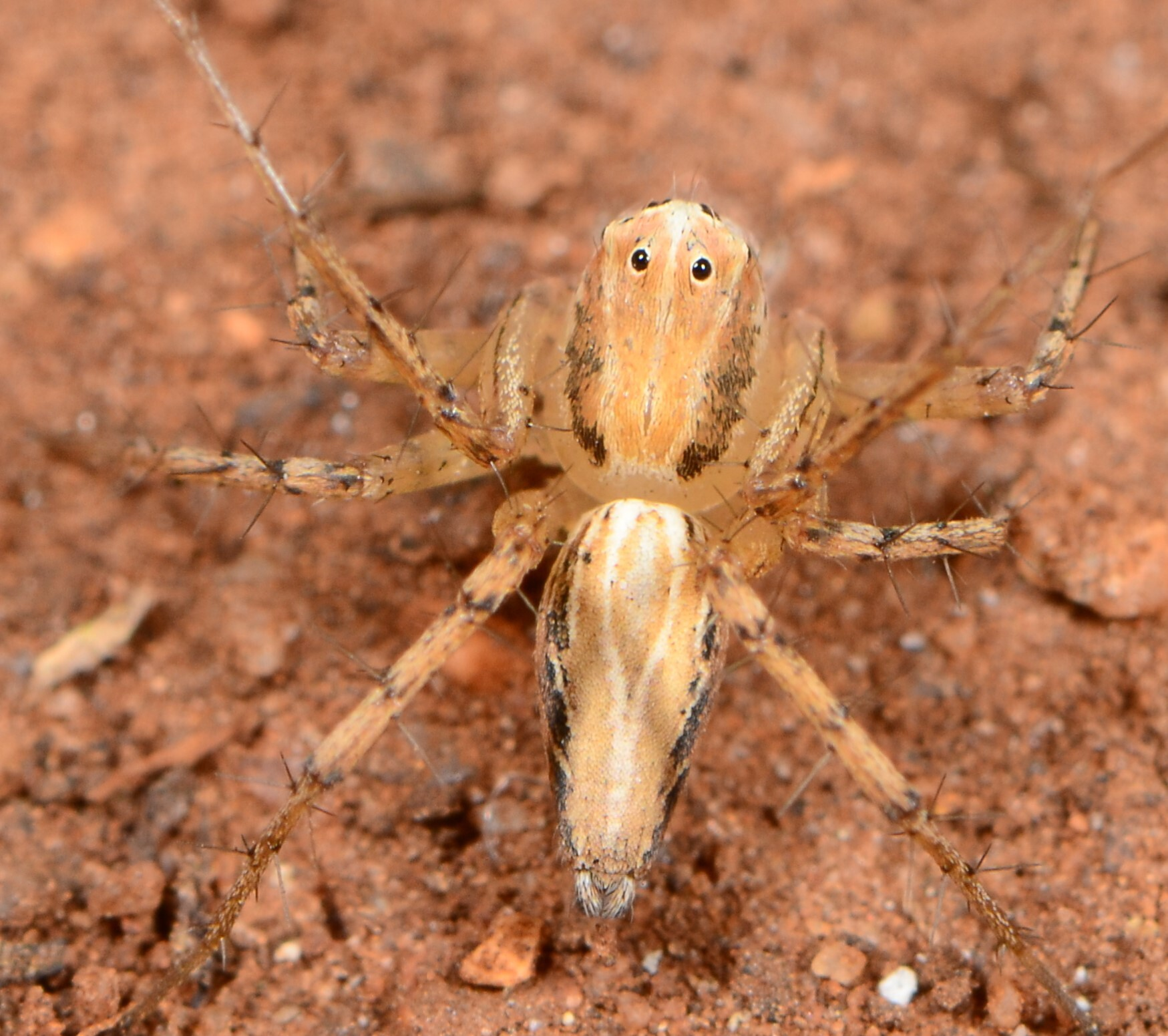
female

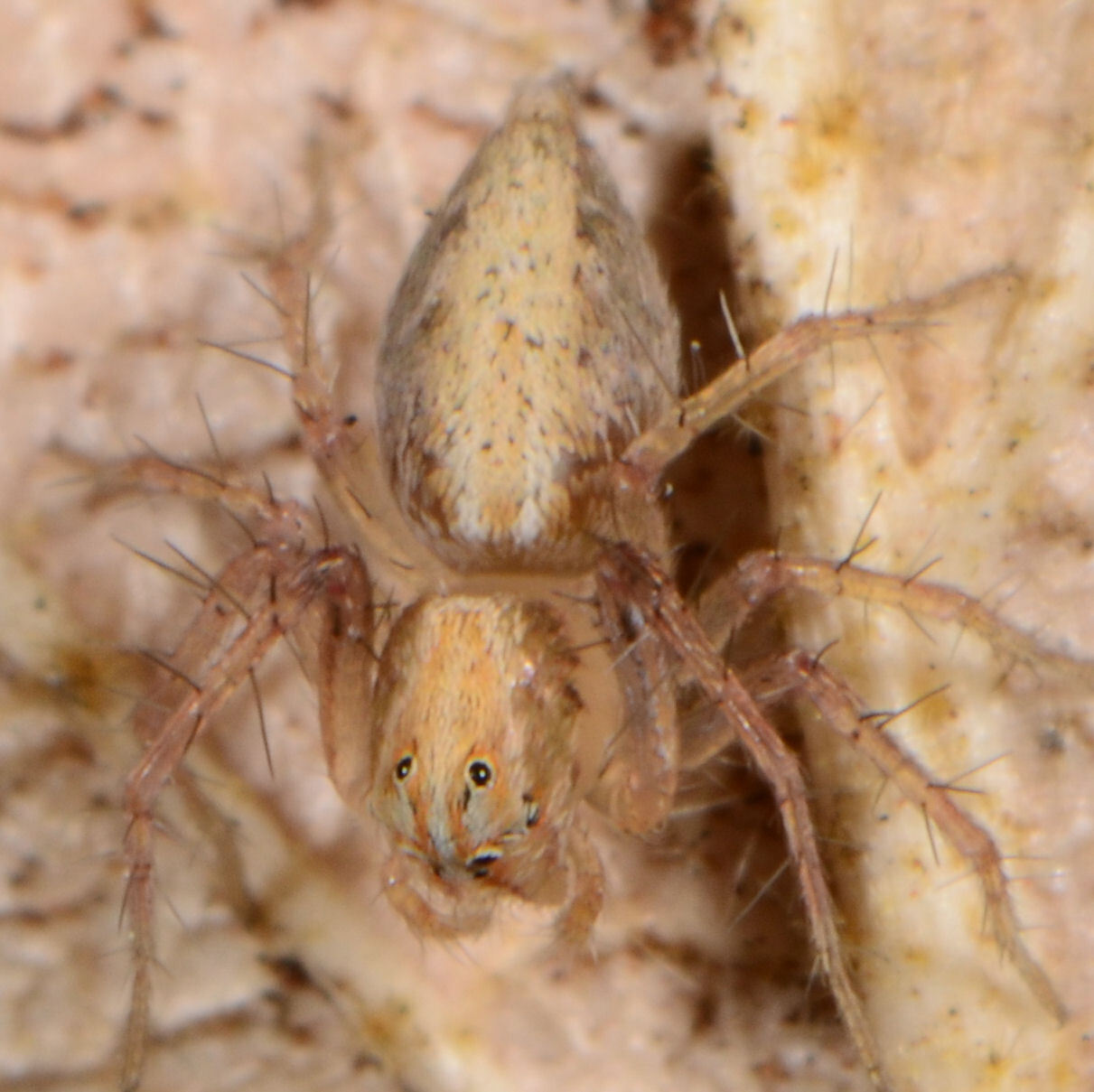
female

Oxyopes affinis is known from both sexes. Like other members of the genus Oxyopes, it is a lynx spider characterized by long, slender legs with prominent spines and an opisthosoma that tapers to a point posteriorly.

== Conservation ==
Oxyopes affinis is listed as Least Concern by the South African National Biodiversity Institute due to its wide geographical range. The species is protected in more than ten protected areas and faces no significant threats.
