= Shuqiangius =

Scientific classification
- Kingdom: Animalia
- Phylum: Arthropoda
- Subphylum: Chelicerata
- Class: Arachnida
- Order: Araneae
- Infraorder: Araneomorphae
- Family: Oxyopidae
- Genus: Shuqiangius; Wang, Marusik & Yao, 2025

Type species
- Tapponia rarobulbus Lo, Cheng & Lin, 2024

Species
- 2, see text

Genus of spiders

Shuqiangius is a genus of spiders in the family Oxyopidae.

== Distribution ==
Shuqiangius is found in China (Sichuan) and Taiwan.

== Etymology ==
The genus is named in honor of arachnologist Shuqiang Li (李枢强; Lǐshūqiáng). S. chuan is named after Sichuan (四川; Sìchuān), the type locality.

== Species ==
As of January 2026, this genus includes two species:

- Shuqiangius chuan Wang, Marusik & Yao, 2025 – China
- Shuqiangius rarobulbus (Lo, Cheng & Lin, 2024) – Taiwan
