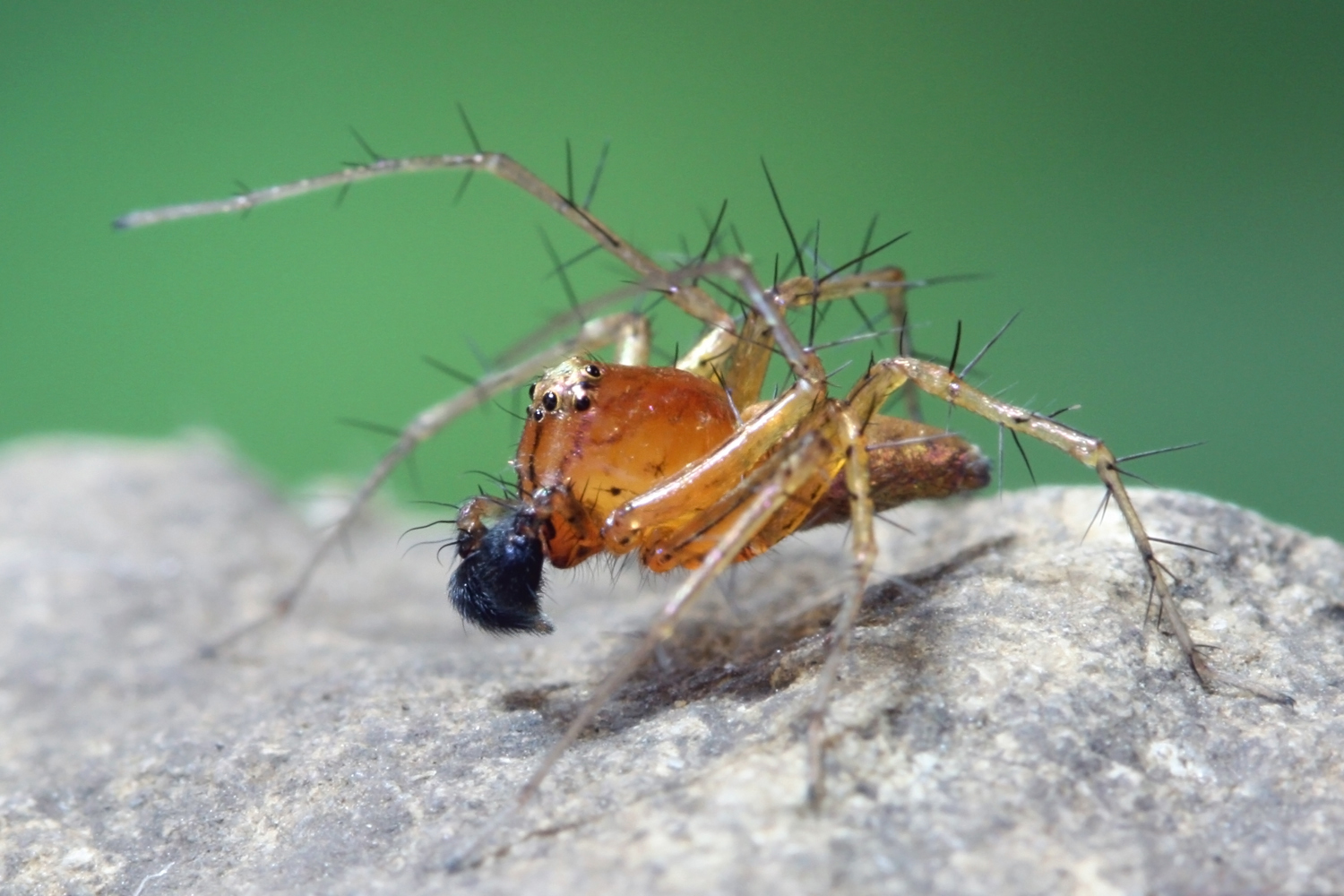
- Striped lynx spider (Oxyopes salticus), male
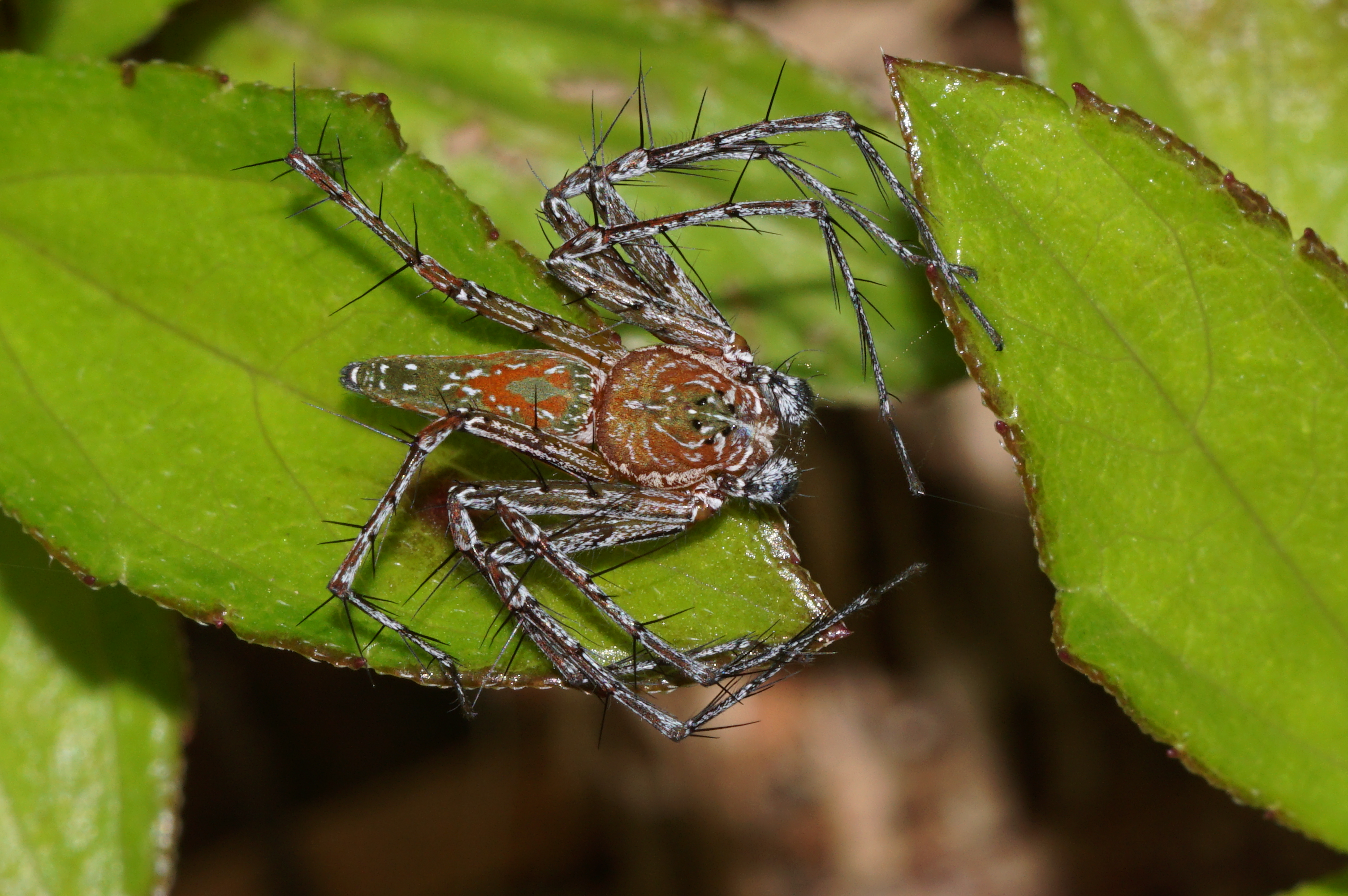
- Hamadruas sp. from India

Scientific classification
- Kingdom: Animalia
- Phylum: Arthropoda
- Subphylum: Chelicerata
- Class: Arachnida
- Order: Araneae
- Infraorder: Araneomorphae
- Family: Oxyopidae; Thorell, 1869

Diversity
- 10 genera, 448 species
- blue: reported countries (WSC) green: observation hotspots (iNaturalist)

= Lynx spider =

Lynx spiders Temporal range: Palaeogene–present

Family of spiders

Lynx spiders (Oxyopidae) is a family of araneomorph spiders first described by Tamerlan Thorell in 1870. Most species make little use of webs, instead spending their lives as hunting spiders on plants. Many species frequent flowers, ambushing pollinators, in a manner similar to crab spiders. They tend to tolerate members of their own species more than most spiders do, and at least one species has been observed exhibiting social behaviour.

== Description ==
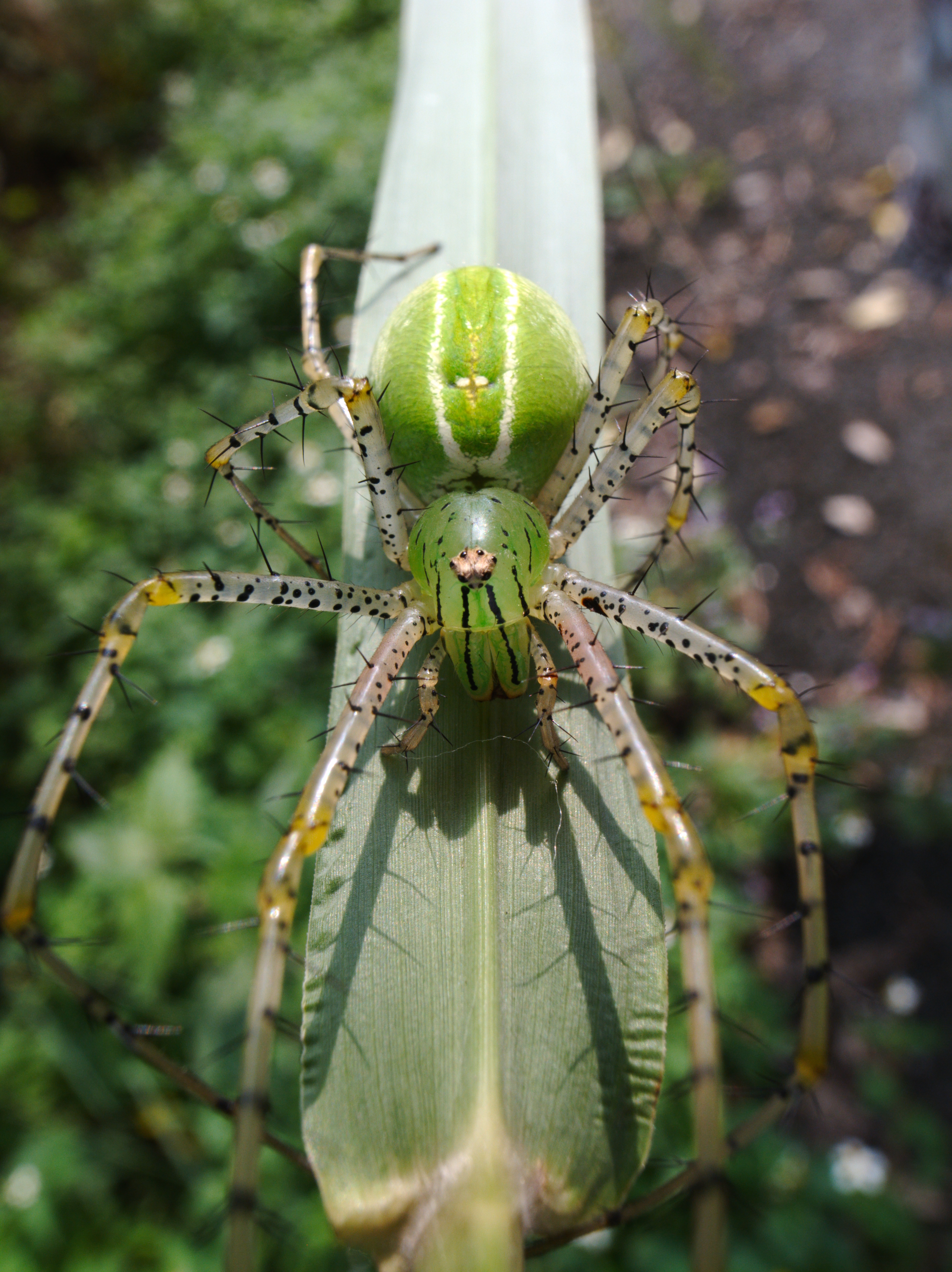
A Peucetia female, showing the eye pattern and the "flat-faced" appearance typical of the Oxyopidae. In this species the leg bristles are only moderately developed.

Most spiders in the Oxyopidae family have large spiny bristles on their legs and in many species the bristles form almost a basket-like structure that may assist in confining the prey that they grasp, and protect the spider from its struggles. Most Oxyopes and Hamataliwa species are small to medium in size. Lynx spiders, in spite of being largely ambush hunters, are very speedy runners and leapers, alert and with good vision. Oxyopidae in general rely on keen eyesight in stalking, chasing, or ambushing prey, and also in avoiding enemies.

== Identification ==
As with many other families of spiders, the arrangement of their eyes is typical of the family and is an important aid in identifying them as members of the family. Six of the eight eyes of Oxyopid spiders are arranged in a hexagon-like pattern, more or less on a prominent hump on the front upper corner of the prosoma. The other two eyes are smaller, less conspicuous, and generally are situated in front of and below the other six. The basal parts of the chelicerae of most species are large, vertical and parallel, which combine with the bluff front end, a "high forehead" to the prosoma, to give most species a peculiar "flat-faced" appearance.

== Hunting ==
Female western lynx spider with ichneumon wasp prey.

Lynx spiders tend to be drab ambush hunters, depending to some extent on the season, some occupy flowers, ambushing pollinating insects. In this they resemble the crab spiders (Thomisidae) in behaviour. Others crouch in wait, camouflaged on plant stalks or bark. Peucetia species on the other hand, commonly are larger. They are rangy and their camouflage is vivid green, adapted to hunting or hiding among foliage.

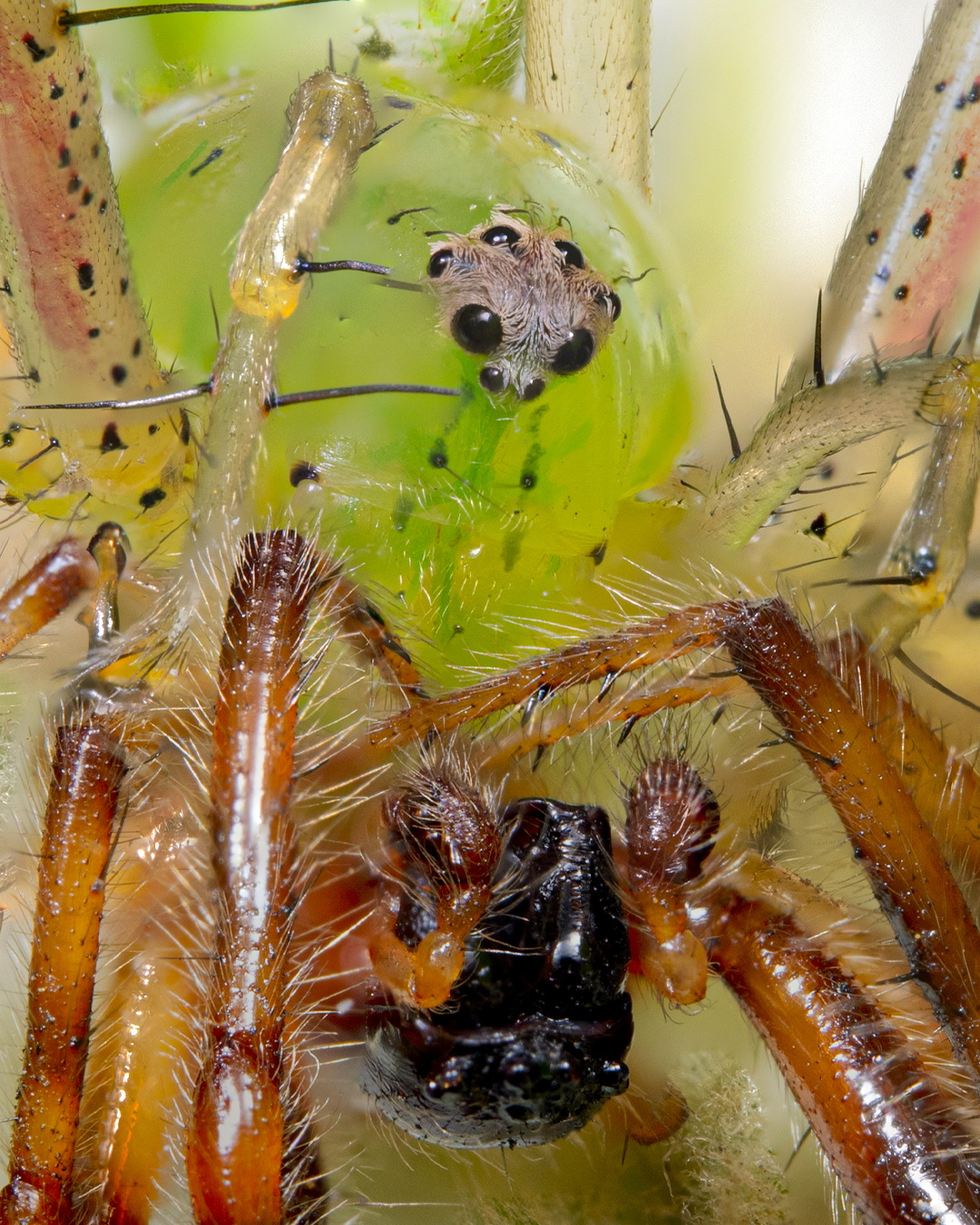

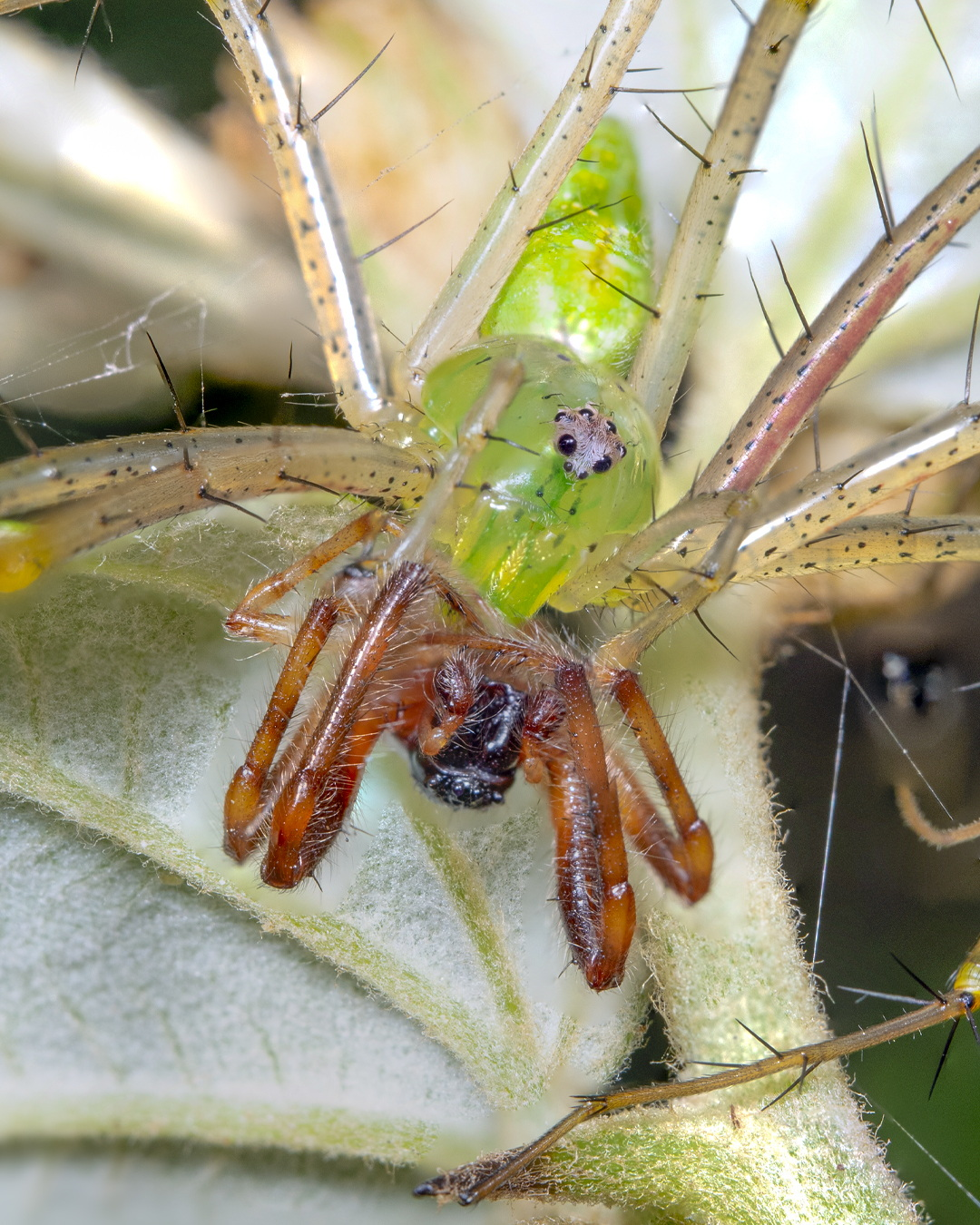

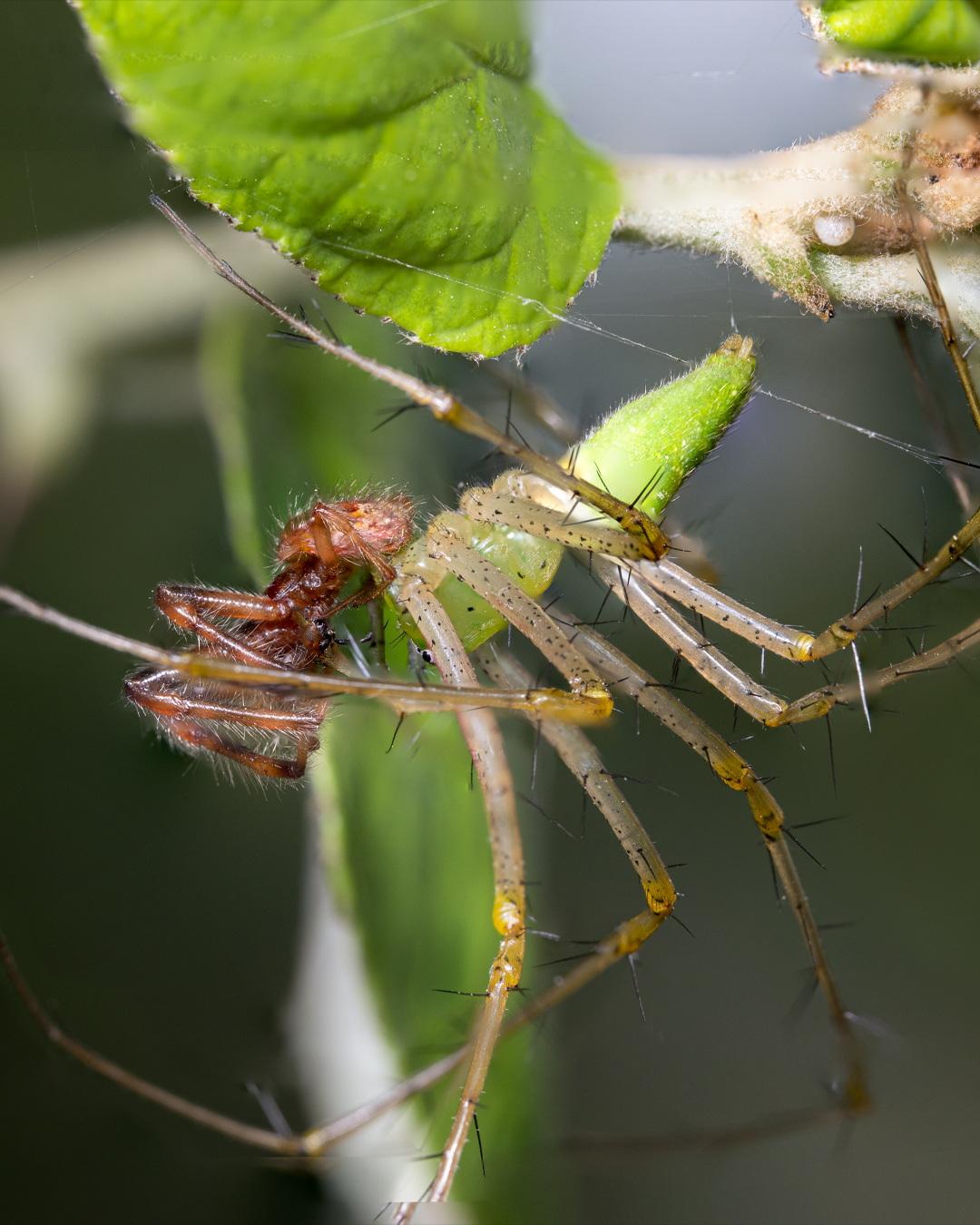

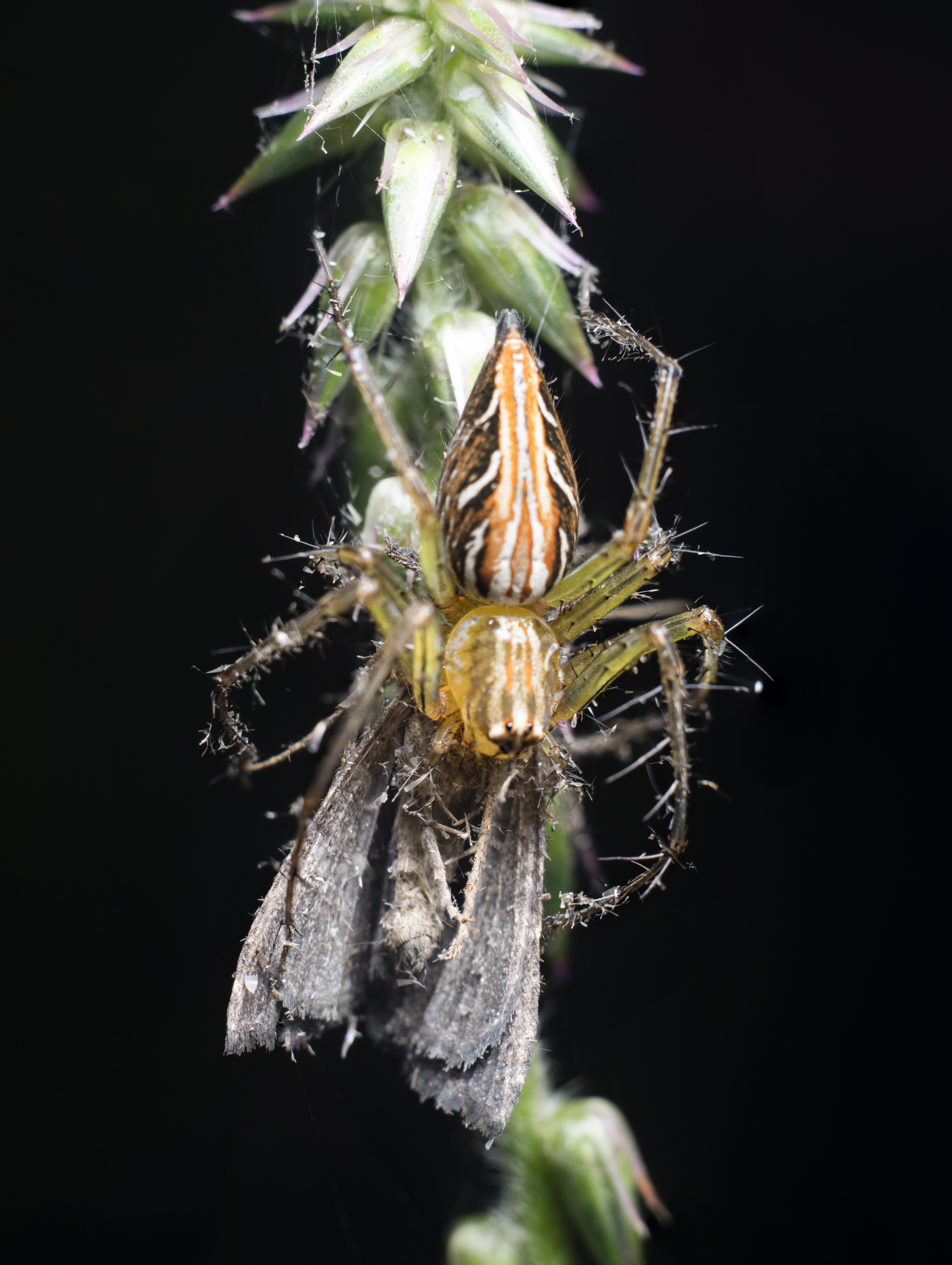

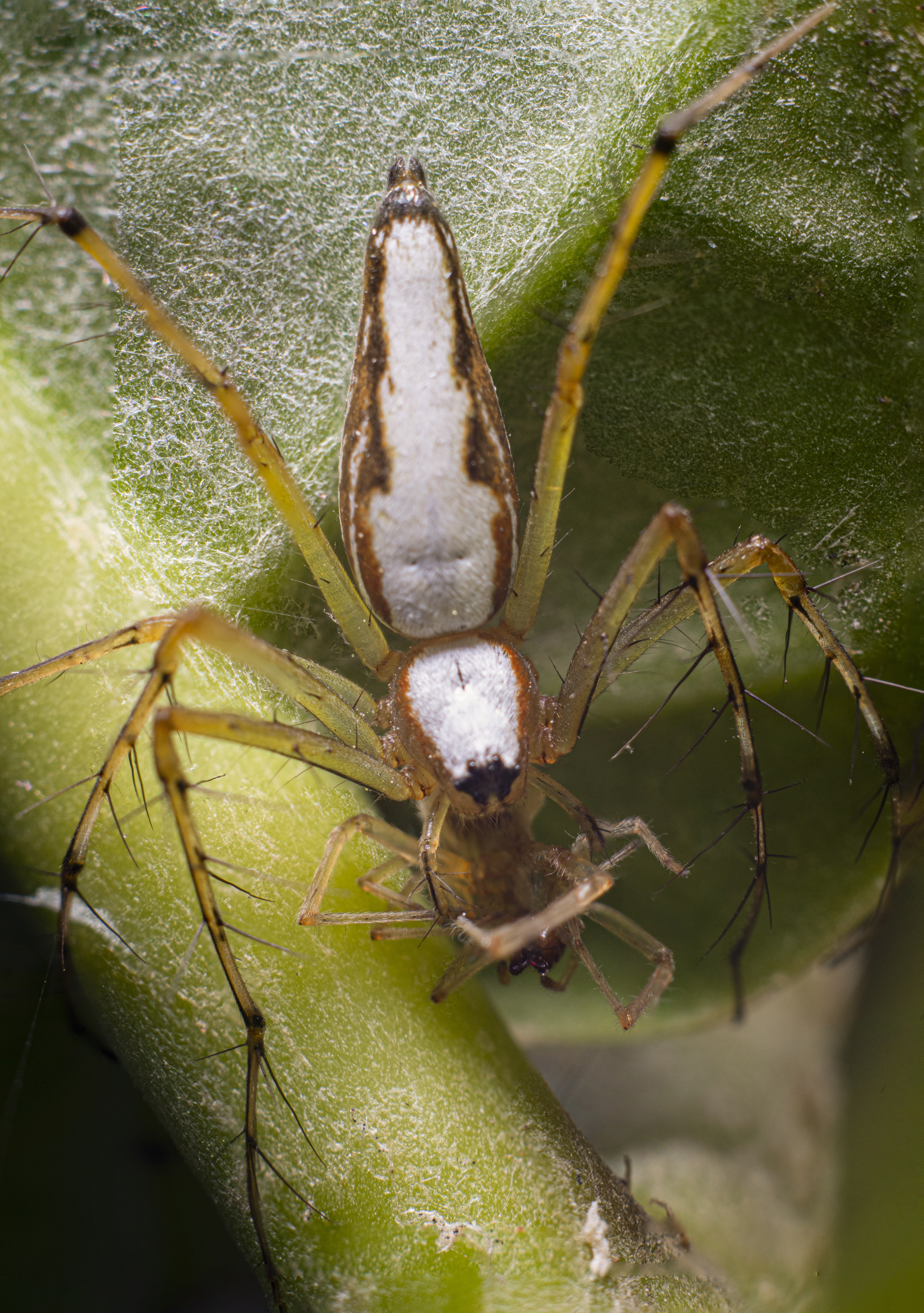

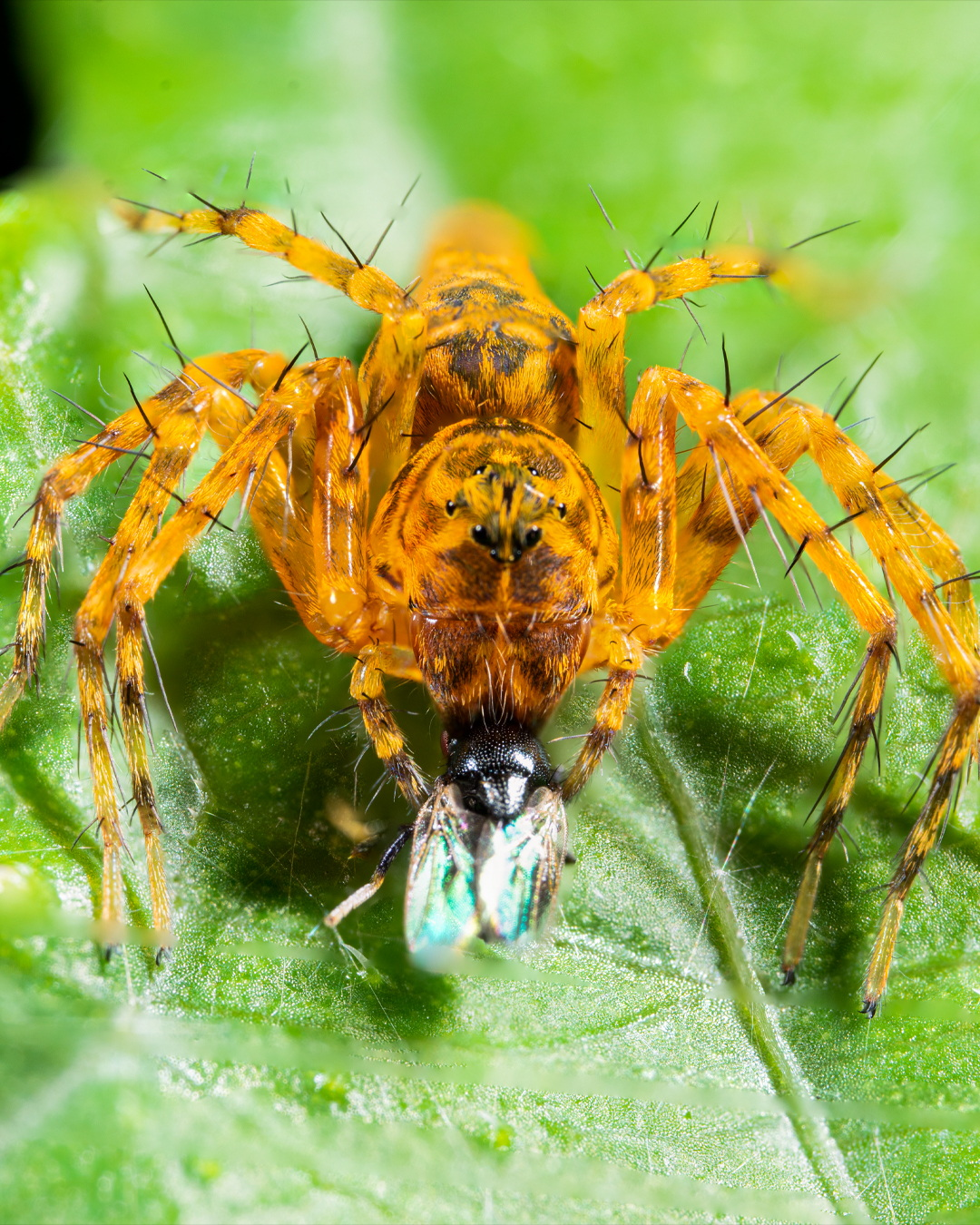

== Behavior ==
Except when defending egg purses, many tend to flee rapidly when approached by predators or large creatures such as humans. They tend not to be very aggressive towards other members of their own species, and sometimes meet casually in small groups. Possibly as an extreme example, at least one member of the genus Tapinillus is remarkable as being one of the few social spiders, living in colonies with communal feeding, cooperative brood care, and generational overlap.

== Benefits ==
Some members of the genus Oxyopes are abundant enough to be important in agricultural systems as biological control agents. This is especially true of the striped lynx spider (Oxyopes salticus). Their net value in agriculture has been disputed however, on the grounds of their predation of pollinators.

== Genera ==
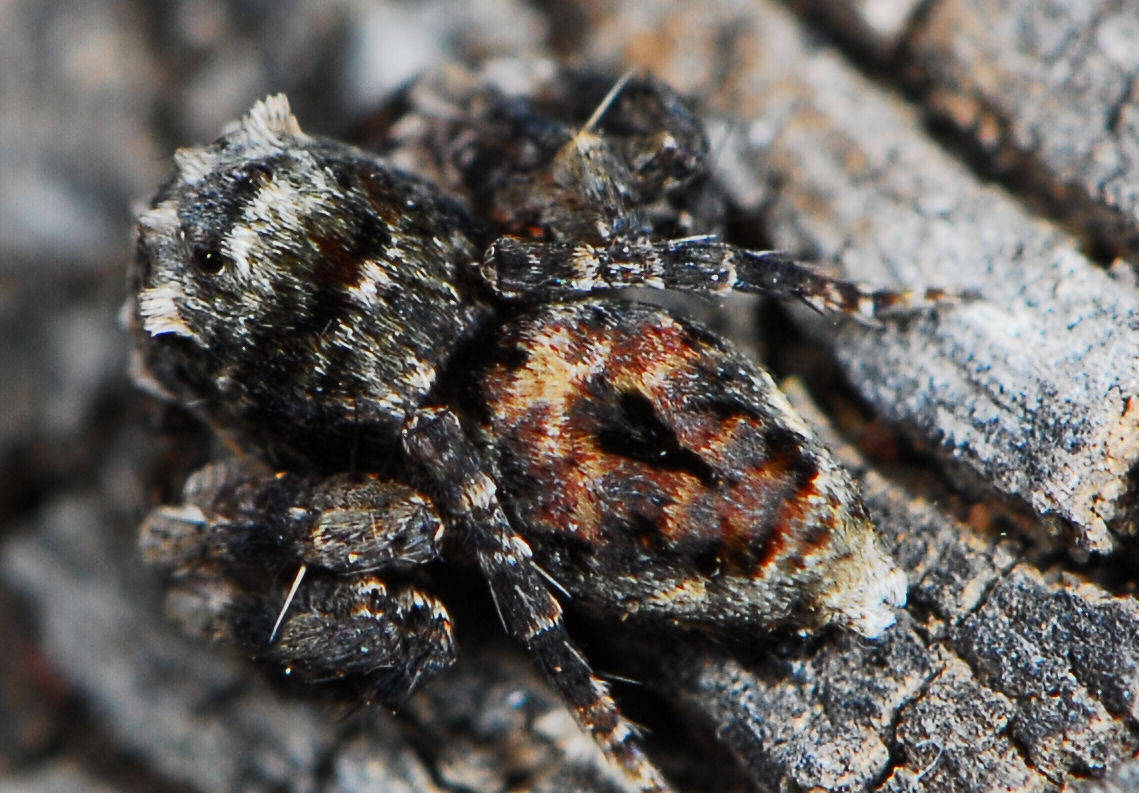
Hamataliwa sp.

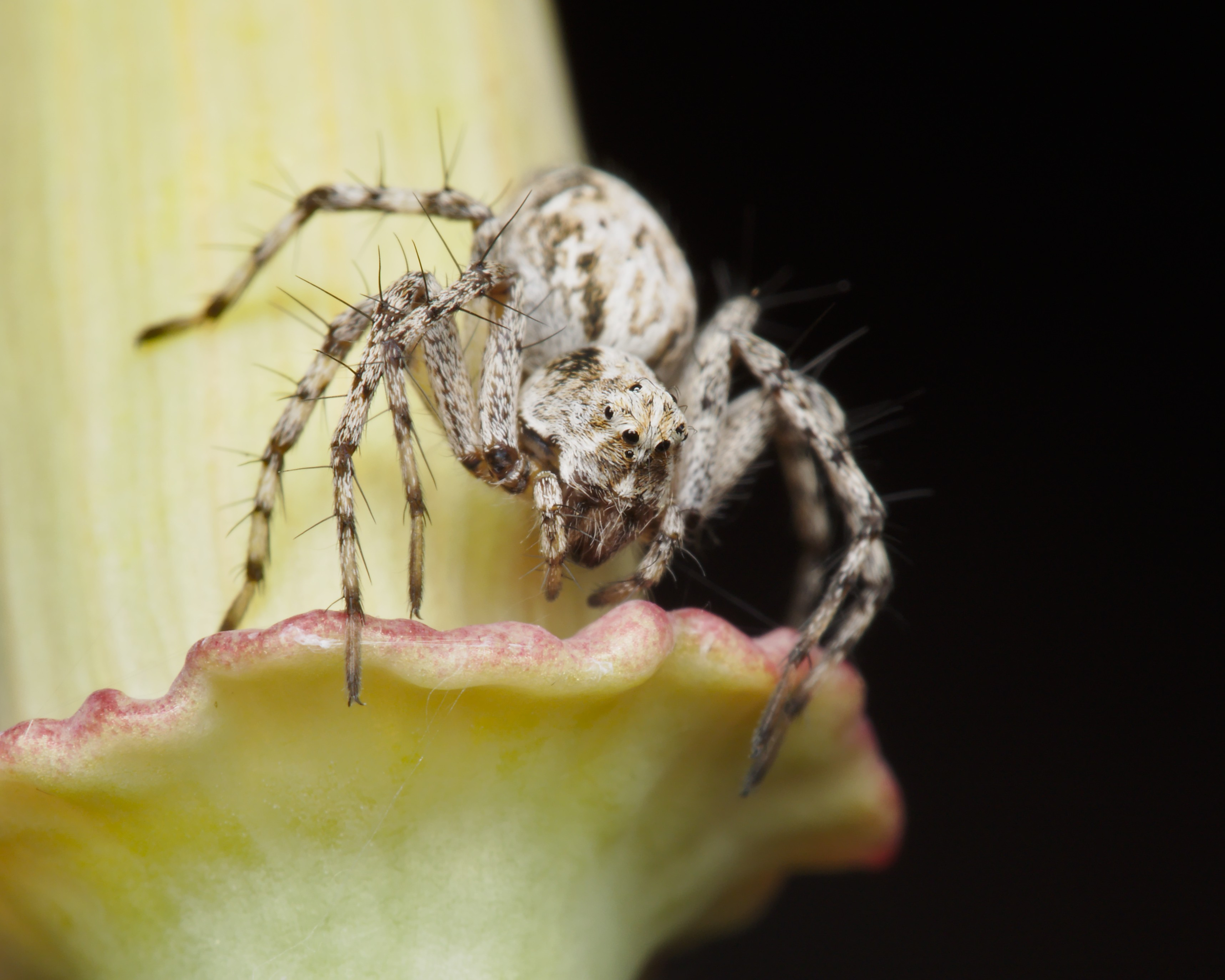
Oxyopes scalaris, Western Lynx Spider

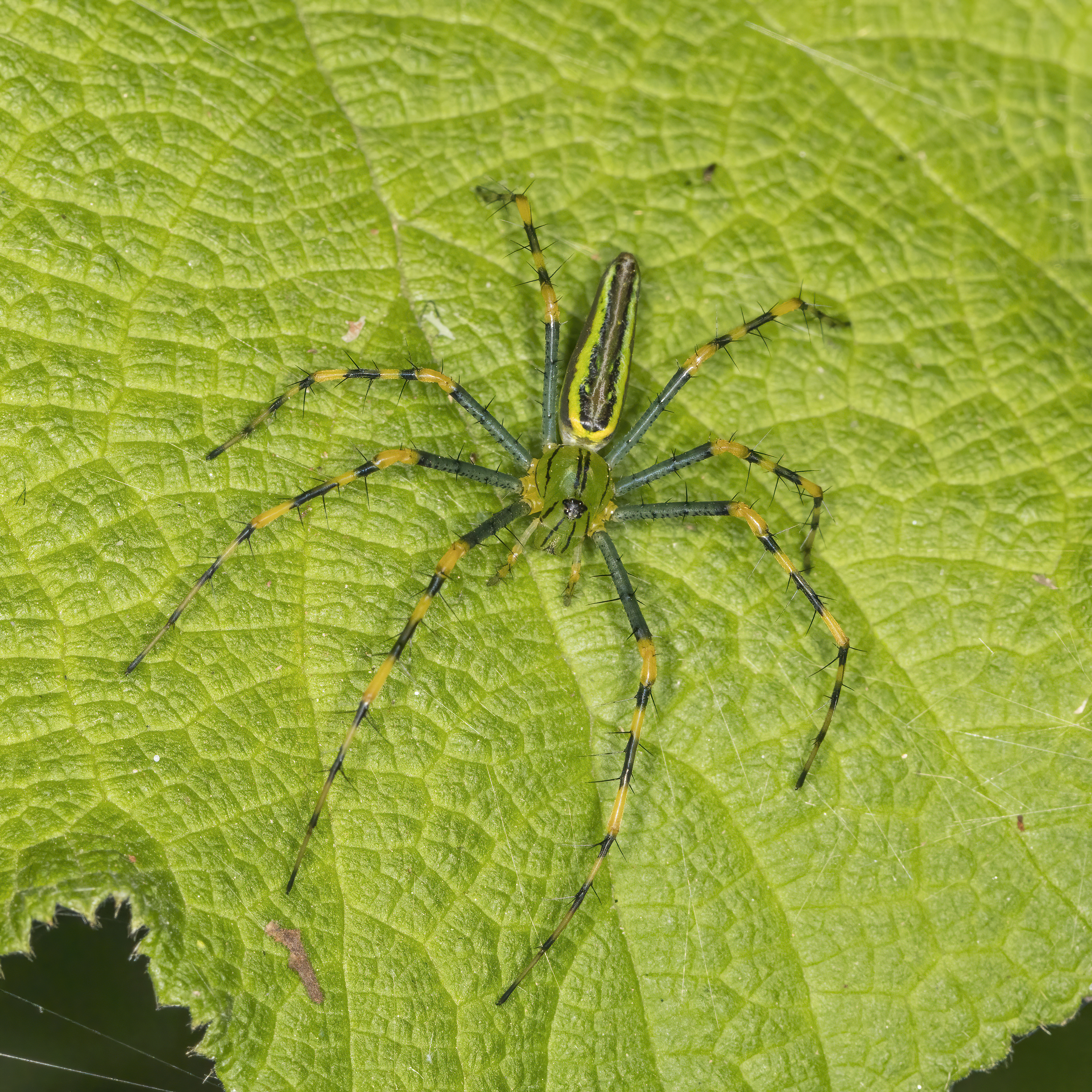
male Peucetia madagascariensis

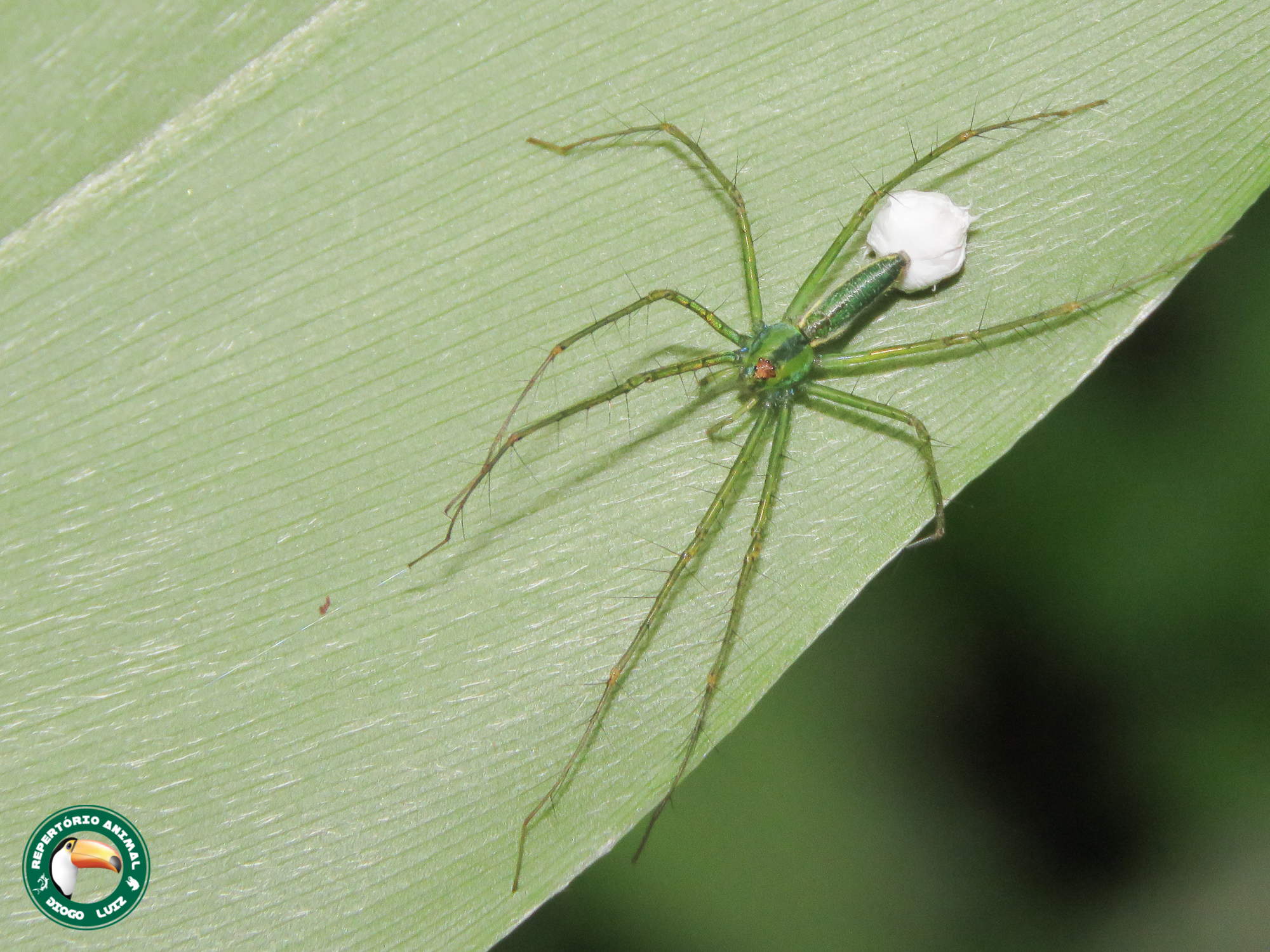
female Schaenicoscelis with egg sac

As of January 2026, this family includes ten genera and 448 species:

- Hamadruas Deeleman-Reinhold, 2009 – Asia
- Hamataliwa Keyserling, 1887 – Africa, Asia, North America, South America, Australia
- Hostus Simon, 1898 – Madagascar
- Oxyopes Latreille, 1804 – Worldwide
- Peucetia Thorell, 1869 – Worldwide
- Pseudohostus Rainbow, 1915 – Australia
- Schaenicoscelis Simon, 1898 – Brazil, Guyana
- Shuqiangius Wang, Marusik & Yao, 2025 – China, Taiwan
- Tapinillus Simon, 1898 – Costa Rica, Panama, South America, Trinidad & Tobago
- Tapponia Simon, 1885 – Taiwan, Indonesia, Malaysia
