= List of Ceroplastes species =

This is a list of 134 species in the genus Ceroplastes, wax scales.

== Ceroplastes species ==
- Ceroplastes actiniformis Green, 1896^{c g}
- Ceroplastes agrestis Hempel, 1932^{c g}
- Ceroplastes ajmerensis (Avasthi & Shafee, 1979)^{c g}
- Ceroplastes alamensis Avasthi & Shafee, 1986^{c g}
- Ceroplastes albolineatus ^{c g}
- Ceroplastes amazonicus Hempel, 1900^{c g}
- Ceroplastes angulatus Cockerell, 1898^{c g}
- Ceroplastes argentinus Brethes, 1921^{c g}
- Ceroplastes avicenniae Newstead, 1917^{c g}
- Ceroplastes bergi Cockerell, 1901^{c g}
- Ceroplastes bernardensis Cockerell, 1902^{c g}
- Ceroplastes bicolor Hempel, 1901^{c g}
- Ceroplastes bipartitus Newstead, 1917^{c g}
- Ceroplastes boyacensis Mosquera, 1979^{c g}
- Ceroplastes brachystegiae Hodgson, 1969^{c g}
- Ceroplastes brachyurus Cockerell, 1903^{c g}
- Ceroplastes brevicauda Hall, 1931^{c g}
- Ceroplastes bruneri Cockerell & Cockerell in Cockerell, 1902^{c g}
- Ceroplastes caesalpiniae Reyne, 1964^{c g}
- Ceroplastes campinensis Hempel, 1901^{c g}
- Ceroplastes candela Cockerell & King in Cockerell, 1902^{c g}
- Ceroplastes cassiae (Chavannes, 1848)^{c g}
- Ceroplastes castelbrancoi Almeida, 1973^{c g}
- Ceroplastes centroroseus Chen, 1974^{c g}
- Ceroplastes ceriferus (Fabricius, 1798)^{c}
- Ceroplastes circumdatus Green, 1923^{c g}
- Ceroplastes cirripediformis Comstock, 1881^{i c g b} (barnacle scale)
- Ceroplastes cistudiformis Cockerell, 1893^{c g}
- Ceroplastes coloratus Cockerell, 1898^{c g}
- Ceroplastes combreti Brain, 1920^{c g}
- Ceroplastes communis Hempel, 1900^{c g}
- Ceroplastes confluens Cockerell & Tinsley, 1898^{c g}
- Ceroplastes coniformis Newstead, 1913^{c g}
- Ceroplastes constricta (De Lotto, 1969)^{c g}
- Ceroplastes cultus Hempel, 1900^{c g}
- Ceroplastes cundinamarcensis Mosquera, 1979^{c g}
- Ceroplastes cuneatus Hempel, 1900^{c g}
- Ceroplastes deceptrix (De Lotto, 1965)^{c g}
- Ceroplastes deciduosus Morrison, 1919^{c g}
- Ceroplastes deodorensis Hempel, 1937^{c g}
- Ceroplastes depressus Cockerell, 1893^{c g}
- Ceroplastes destructor Newstead, 1917^{c g}
- Ceroplastes diospyros Hempel, 1928^{c g}
- Ceroplastes dugesii Lichtenstein, 1885^{c g}
- Ceroplastes elytropappi (Brain, 1920)^{c g}
- Ceroplastes eucleae Brain, 1920^{c g}
- Ceroplastes eugeniae Hall, 1931^{c g}
- Ceroplastes excaecariae Hempel, 1912^{c g}
- Ceroplastes fairmairii Signoret, 1872^{c g}
- Ceroplastes ficus Newstead, 1910^{c g}
- Ceroplastes floridensis Comstock, 1881^{c g}
- Ceroplastes flosculoides Matile-Ferrero in Matile-Ferrero & Couturier, 1993^{c g}
- Ceroplastes formicarius Hempel, 1900^{c g}
- Ceroplastes formosus Hempel, 1900^{c g}
- Ceroplastes fumidus De Lotto, 1978^{c g}
- Ceroplastes galeatus Newstead, 1911^{c g}
- Ceroplastes giganteus Dozier, 1931^{c g}
- Ceroplastes gigas Cockerell, 1914^{c g}
- Ceroplastes grandis Hempel, 1900^{c g}
- Ceroplastes gregarius Hempel, 1932^{c g}
- Ceroplastes hawanus Williams & Watson, 1990^{c g}
- Ceroplastes helichrysi Hall, 1931^{c g}
- Ceroplastes hempeli Lizer y Trelles, 1919^{c g}
- Ceroplastes hodgsoni (Matile-Ferrero & Le Ruyet, 1985)^{c g}
- Ceroplastes hololeucus De Lotto, 1969^{c g}
- Ceroplastes iheringi Cockerell, 1895^{c g}
- Ceroplastes immanis Green, 1935^{c g}
- Ceroplastes insulanus De Lotto, 1971^{c g}
- Ceroplastes irregularis Cockerell, 1893^{c g}
- Ceroplastes itatiayensis Hempel, 1938^{c g}
- Ceroplastes jamaicensis White, 1846^{c g}
- Ceroplastes janeirensis (Gray, 1828)^{c g}
- Ceroplastes japonicus Green, 1921^{c g}
- Ceroplastes kunmingensis (Tang & Xie in Tang, 1991)^{c g}
- Ceroplastes lahillei Cockerell, 1910^{c g}
- Ceroplastes lamborni Newstead, 1917^{c g}
- Ceroplastes leonardianus Lizer y Trelles, 1939^{c g}
- Ceroplastes lepagei Costa Lima, 1940^{c g}
- Ceroplastes longicauda ^{c g}
- Ceroplastes longiseta Leonardi, 1911^{c g}
- Ceroplastes lucidus Hempel, 1900^{c g}
- Ceroplastes macgregori Sampedro & Butze, 1984^{c g}
- Ceroplastes magnicauda Reyne, 1964^{c g}
- Ceroplastes marmoreus Cockerell, 1903^{c g}
- Ceroplastes martinae Mosquera, 1979^{c g}
- Ceroplastes mierii (Targioni Tozzetti, 1866)^{c g}
- Ceroplastes milleri Takahashi, 1939^{c g}
- Ceroplastes minutus Cockerell, 1898^{c g}
- Ceroplastes mosquerai Ben-Dov, 1993^{c g}
- Ceroplastes murrayi Froggatt, 1919^{c g}
- Ceroplastes myricae (Linnaeus, 1767)^{c g}
- Ceroplastes nakaharai Gimpel in Gimpel, Miller & Davidson, 1974^{c g}
- Ceroplastes novaesi Hempel, 1900^{c g}
- Ceroplastes ocreus Mosquera, 1984^{c g}
- Ceroplastes parvus Green, 1935^{c g}
- Ceroplastes paucispinus De Lotto, 1970^{c g}
- Ceroplastes personatus Newstead, 1898^{c g}
- Ceroplastes pseudoceriferus Green, 1935^{c g}
- Ceroplastes psidii (Chavannes, 1848)^{c g}
- Ceroplastes purpurellus Cockerell, 1903^{c g}
- Ceroplastes purpureus Hempel, 1900^{c g}
- Ceroplastes quadratus Green, 1935^{c g}
- Ceroplastes quadrilineatus Newstead, 1910^{c g}
- Ceroplastes rarus Hempel, 1900^{c g}
- Ceroplastes reunionensis Ben-Dov & Matile-Ferrero in: Ben-Dov et al., 2000^{c g}
- Ceroplastes rhizophorae Hempel, 1918^{c g}
- Ceroplastes rotundus Hempel, 1900^{c g}
- Ceroplastes royenae Hall, 1931^{c g}
- Ceroplastes rubens Maskell, 1839^{i c g b} (red wax scale)
- Ceroplastes rufus De Lotto, 1966^{c g}
- Ceroplastes rusci (Linnaeus, 1758)^{c g b} (fig scale)
- Ceroplastes rusticus De Lotto, 1961^{c g}
- Ceroplastes sanguineus Cockerell, 1905^{c g}
- Ceroplastes schrottkyi Cockerell, 1905^{c g}
- Ceroplastes simplex Hempel, 1900^{c g}
- Ceroplastes sinensis Del Guercio, 1900^{c g b} (Chinese wax scale)
- Ceroplastes singularis Newstead, 1910^{c g}
- Ceroplastes sinoiae Hall, 1931^{c g}
- Ceroplastes speciosus Hempel, 1900^{c g}
- Ceroplastes spicatus Hall, 1937^{c g}
- Ceroplastes stenocephalus De Lotto, 1961^{c g}
- Ceroplastes subrotundus Leonardi, 1911^{c g}
- Ceroplastes sumatrensis Reyne, 1965^{c g}
- Ceroplastes tachardiaformis Brain, 1920^{c g}
- Ceroplastes theobromae Newstead, 1908^{c g}
- Ceroplastes titschaki Lindinger, 1942^{c g}
- Ceroplastes toddafiae Hall^{g}
- Ceroplastes toddaliae Hall, 1931^{c g}
- Ceroplastes trochezi Mosquera, 1979^{c g}
- Ceroplastes uapacae Hall, 1931^{c g}
- Ceroplastes utilis Cockerell, 1893^{c g}
- Ceroplastes variegatus Hempel, 1900^{c g}
- Ceroplastes vinsonioides Newstead, 1911^{c g}
- Ceroplastes xishuangensis Tang & Xie in Tang, 1991^{c g}

Data sources: i = ITIS, c = Catalogue of Life, g = GBIF, b = Bugguide.net
