= Edella clava =

Scientific classification
- Domain: Eukaryota
- Kingdom: Animalia
- Phylum: Arthropoda
- Subphylum: Chelicerata
- Class: Arachnida
- Order: Trombidiformes
- Family: Tetranychidae
- Genus: Edella
- Species: E. clava

Binomial name
- Edella clava Meyer, 1974

Species of mite

Edella clava is a species of spider mite in the family Tetranychidae.
