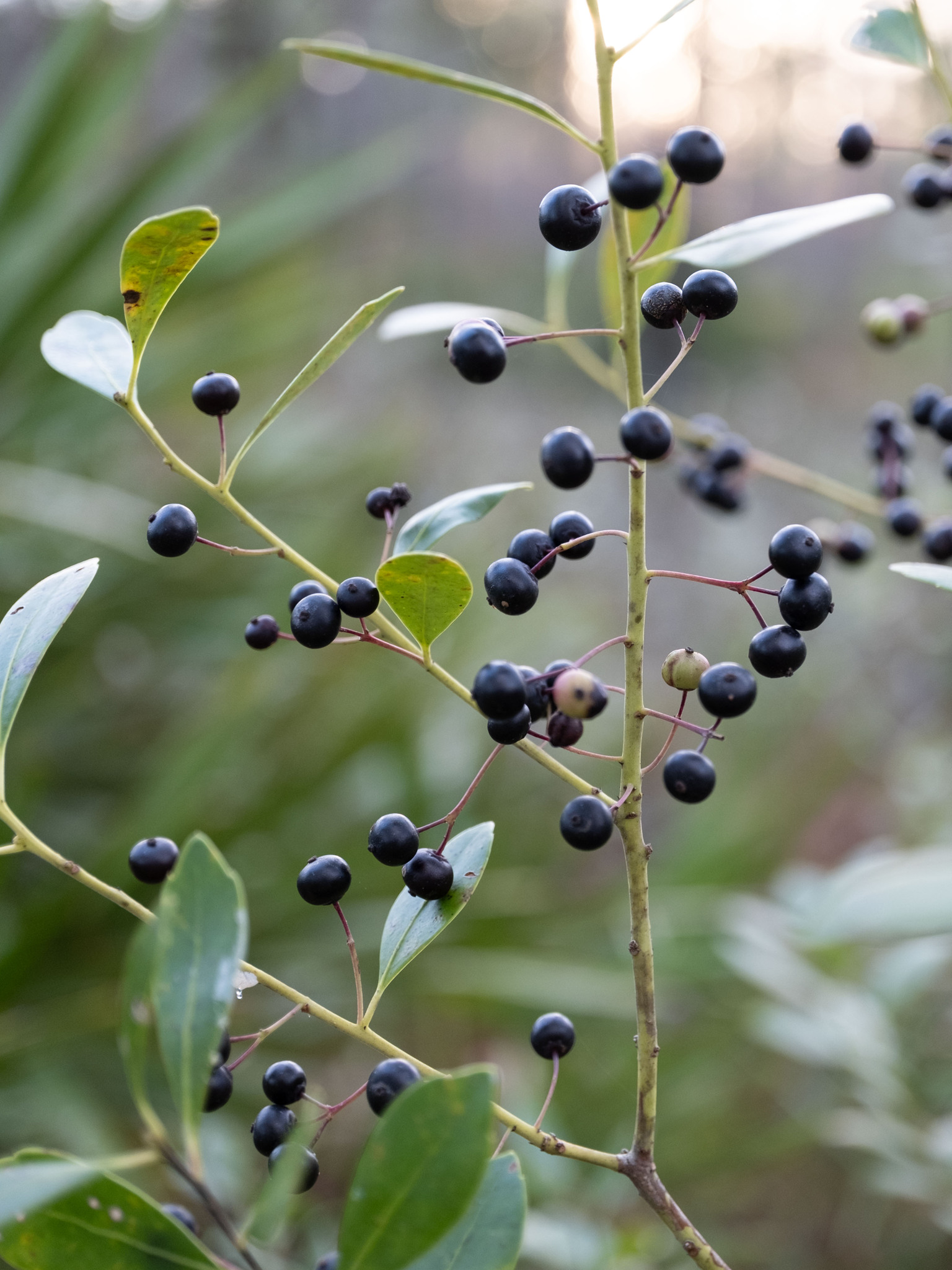

Conservation status
- Least Concern (IUCN 3.1)

- Secure (NatureServe)

Scientific classification
- Kingdom: Plantae
- Clade: Embryophytes
- Clade: Tracheophytes
- Clade: Angiosperms
- Clade: Eudicots
- Clade: Asterids
- Order: Aquifoliales
- Family: Aquifoliaceae
- Genus: Ilex
- Species: I. glabra

Binomial name
- Ilex glabra (L.) Gray

= Ilex glabra =

Inkberry

Species of holly

Ilex glabra (/aɪlɛks ɡleɪbrʌ/; EYE-leks GLAY-bruh), also known as Appalachian tea, evergreen winterberry, Canadian winterberry, gallberry, inkberry, dye-leaves and houx galbre, is a species of evergreen holly native to the coastal plain of eastern North America, from coastal Nova Scotia to Florida and west to Louisiana where it is most commonly found in sandy woods and peripheries of swamps and bogs. Ilex glabra is often found in landscapes of the middle and lower East Coast of the United States. It normally is cultivated as an evergreen shrub in USDA zones 6 to 10.

== Description ==
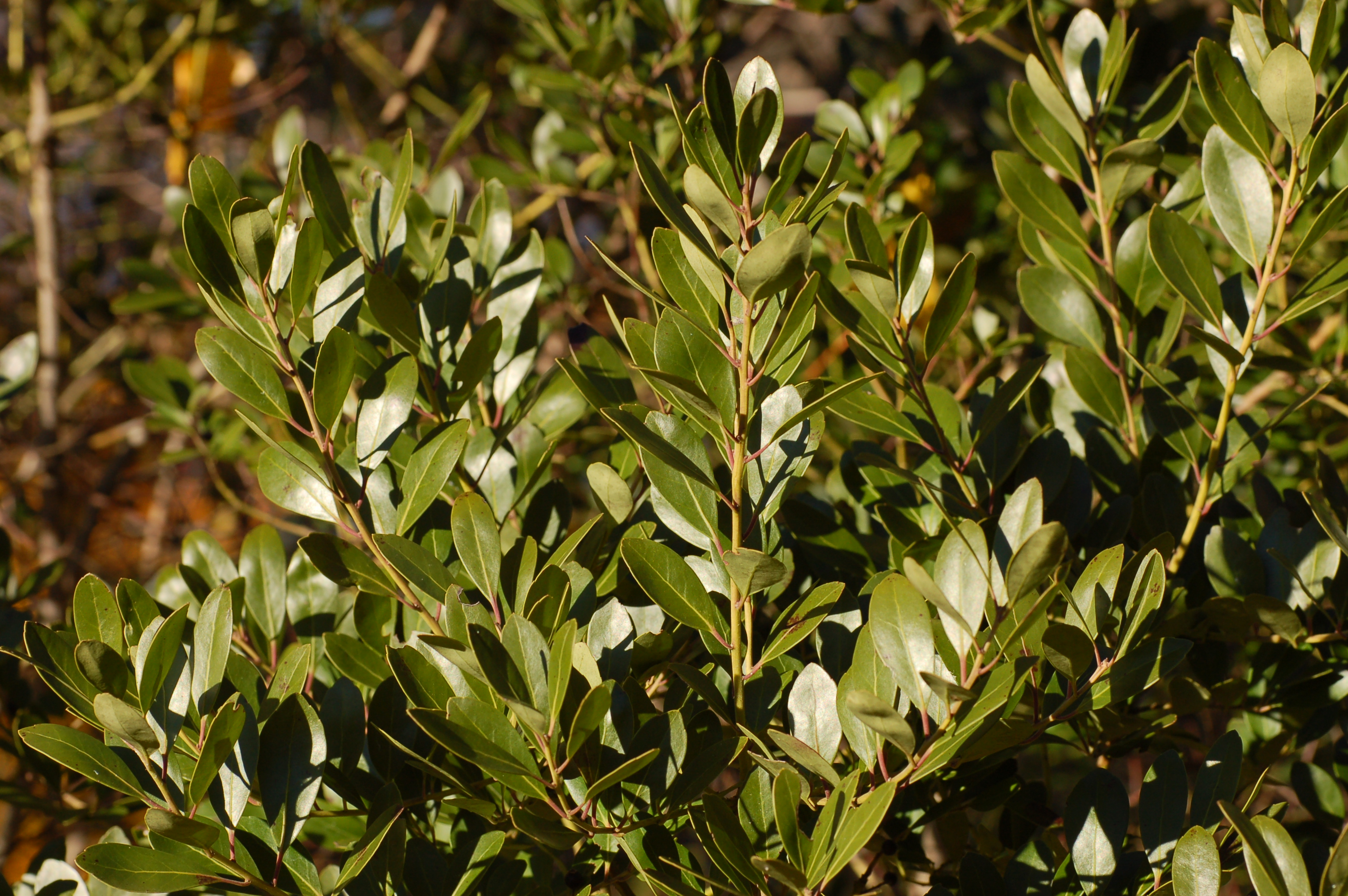
'Compacta' leaves

Ilex glabra grows around five to ten feet (1.5 to 3.0 m) in height and can be five to eight feet (1.5 to 2.4 m) wide. The leaves are smooth, about 0.5 inches (13 mm) wide, glossy, and dark green. The flowers are green-white while the fruits are black.

== Hosted insects ==
Honey bees and Henry's elfin are among pollinators attracted to Ilex glabra. The Japanese wax scale, native holly leafminer, and southern red mite are pests to the plant.
