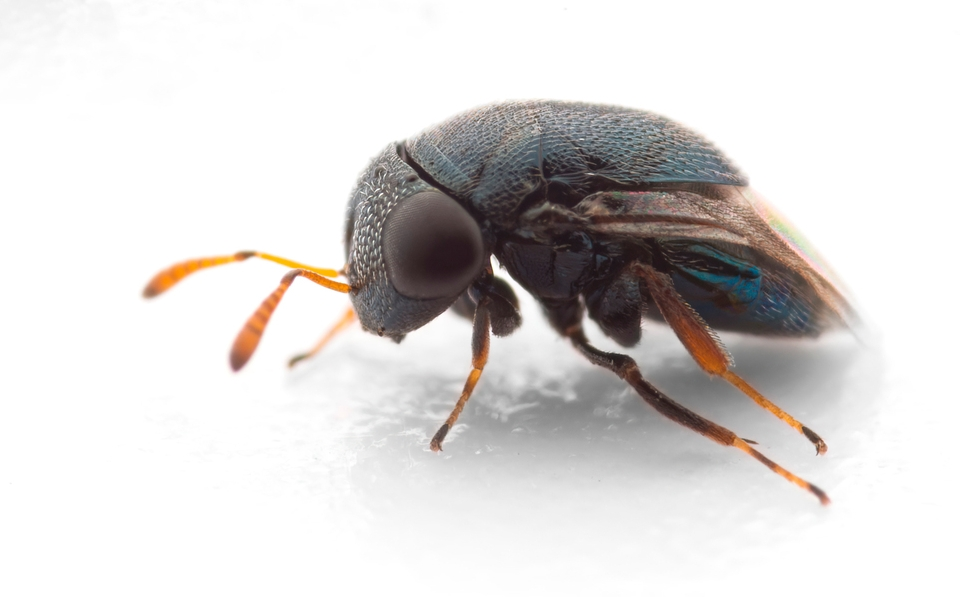
- Scutellista sp.

Scientific classification
- Domain: Eukaryota
- Kingdom: Animalia
- Phylum: Arthropoda
- Class: Insecta
- Order: Hymenoptera
- Family: Eunotidae
- Subfamily: Eunotinae
- Genus: Scutellista; Motschulsky, 1859

= Scutellista =

Genus of wasps

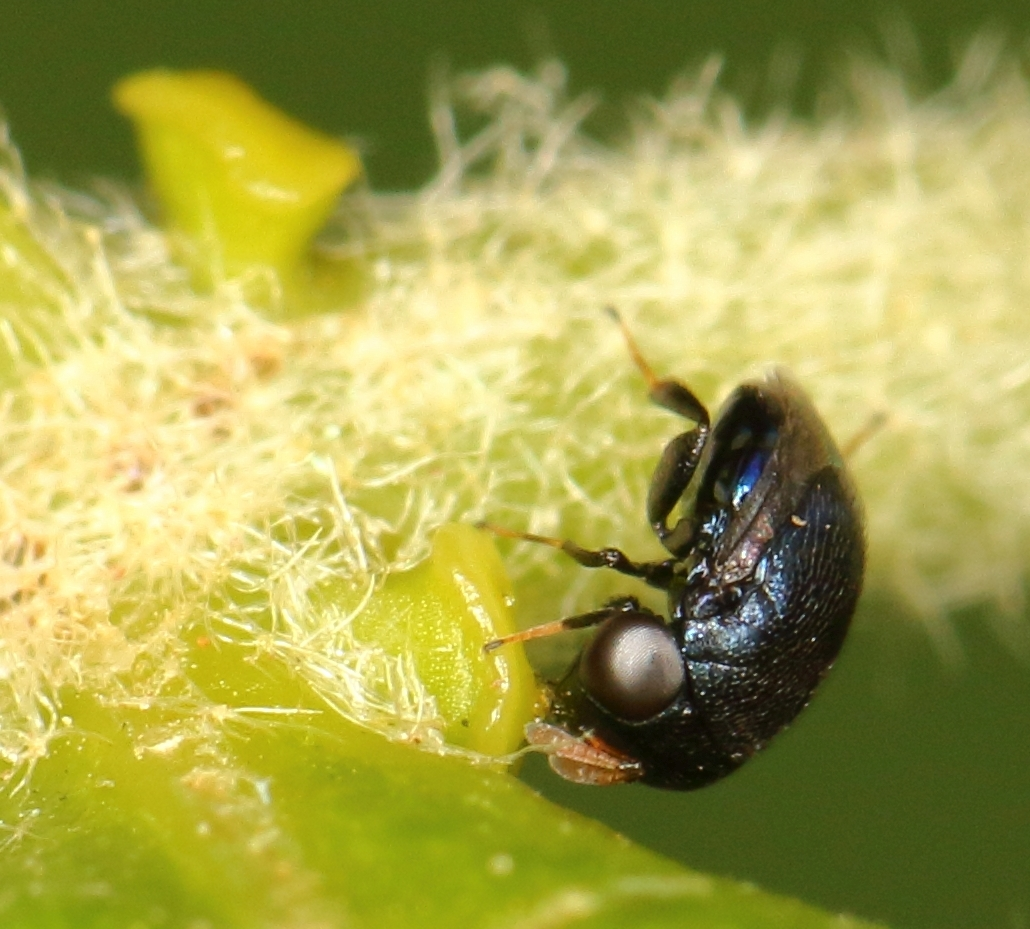
Scutellista sp. at a petiolar nectary (Croton megalabotrys)

Scutellista is a genus of chalcid wasps. They are parasitoids of scale insects.

== Description ==
The scutellum projects as a roof over about two-thirds of the gaster. The mesoscutum and scutellum have with many scattered short hairs, rather than pairs of strong bristles.

== Taxonomy ==
The genus Scutellista includes the following species:

- Scutellista aenea Kurdjumov, 1912; found in Ukraine.
- Scutellista caerulea (Fonscolombe, 1832), a parasitoid of many scale insect species (Coccoidea); it has been introduced into many countries as a biological control agent, and has a world-wide distribution.
- Scutellista gigantea Berlese, 1916, a parasitoid of the scale insect Ceroplastes mimosae; found in Eritrea.
- Scutellista hayati (Farooqi, 1981), a parasitoid of Cerococcus, a scale insect; found in India
- Scutellista hispanica (Masi, 1931); found in Croatia and Spain.
- Scutellista nigra Mercet, 1910, a parasitoid of scale insects; found in Algeria, Croatia, Egypt, Greece, and Spain.
- Scutellista obscura (Foerster, 1878), a parasitoid of scale insects; found in the Palearctic.
- Scutellista ovivora (Ishii, 1928), a parasitoid of Lecanium, a scale insect; found in Japan.
