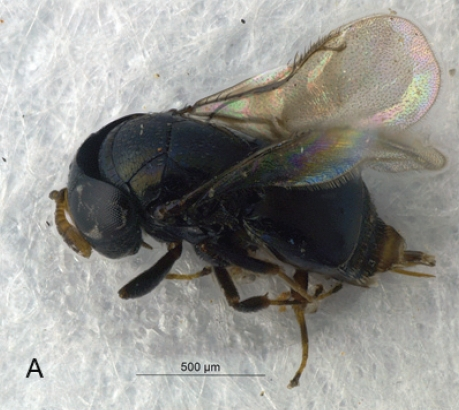
- Mesopeltita truncatipennis

Scientific classification
- Domain: Eukaryota
- Kingdom: Animalia
- Phylum: Arthropoda
- Class: Insecta
- Order: Hymenoptera
- Family: Eunotidae
- Genus: Mesopeltita; Ghesquiere, 1946
- Species: M. truncatipennis

Binomial name
- Mesopeltita truncatipennis (Waterston, 1917)

Synonyms
- Species synonymy: Eunotus truncatipennis Waterston, 1917; Mesopeltis atrocyanea Masi, 1917; Mesopeltis truncatipennis (Waterston, 1917); Mesopeltita atrocyanea (Masi, 1917)

= Mesopeltita =

Species of wasp

Mesopeltita is a genus of chalcid wasps. The only species, Mesopeltita truncatipennis, is a parasitoid of coccid scale insects (Ceroplastes, Lecanium, and Saissetia species); it has been found on pigeon pea, Cajanus cajan. The species has been found in many countries (Antilles, Brazil, Caribbean, Ghana, India, Japan, Mauritius, Mexico, São Tomé and Príncipe, Seychelles, Sierra Leone, United States of America, Venezuela).

== Description ==
Mesopeltita truncatipennis has a shiny black head and thorax. The occiput is separated from the vertex by a sharp carina and the antennal funicle has three anelliform segments. The middle lobe of the mesoscutum and the scutellum display a reticulate sculpture and the posterior margin of the scutellum is demarcated by a distinct rim, which is separated by a groove containing punctae. The axillae are smooth and the notauli are shallow. The forewing has an angular excision on the anterior margin at the apex of the costal cell. The marginal vein is slender and bears both long and short setae. The first tergite is large and convex, and it covers most of the gastral surface.
