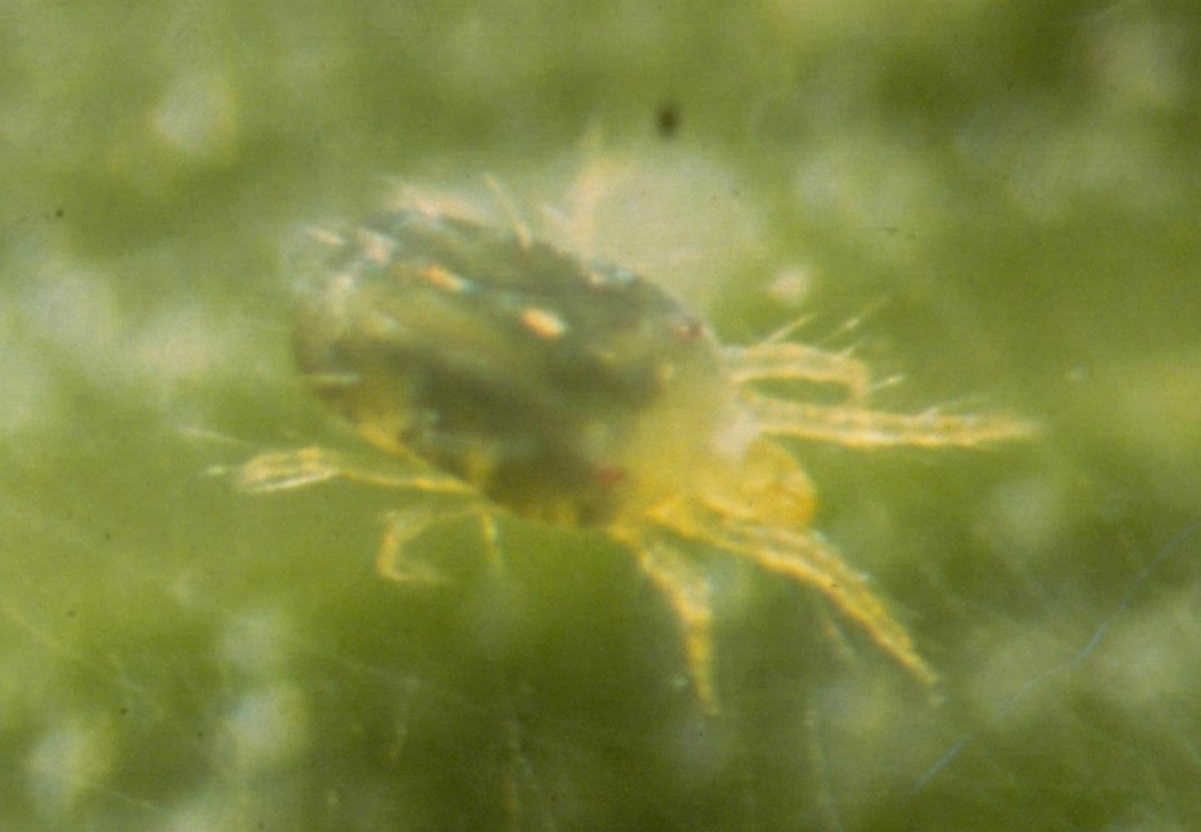
- Oligonychus pratensis adult

Scientific classification
- Kingdom: Animalia
- Phylum: Arthropoda
- Subphylum: Chelicerata
- Class: Arachnida
- Order: Trombidiformes
- Family: Tetranychidae
- Genus: Oligonychus
- Species: O. pratensis

Binomial name
- Oligonychus pratensis (Banks, 1912)

= Oligonychus pratensis =

Species of mite

Oligonychus pratensis, the Banks grass mite, is a species of mite in the spider mite family. They are considered a pest and often infest corn and turf grasses.

== Description ==
Adult Banks grass mites range from green to brown in colour and are approximately 1/32 of an inch (~0.79 mm) in length. On either side of the body is a row of brown/reddish-brown spots, the number and position of which can be used to distinguish O. pratensis from the related two-spotted spider mite (Tetranychus urticae).

This species can be distinguished from other Oligonychus by features such as the pattern of striation on the body, the setae on the legs and the shape of the male genitalia.

== Life cycle ==
The life cycle of Banks grass mite comprises the stages: egg, larva, protonymph, deutonymph and adult.

Eggs are laid on the underside of leaves and (in spring and summer conditions) hatch 3-10 days later. The mites develop rapidly, with one generation potentially taking as few as 10 days. All life stages may occur on the same leaf of a plant at once, either out in the open or beneath protective silk webbing. During the winter, female mites and eggs overwinter in sheltered sites such as plant debris.

== Diet ==
Like other spider mites, Oligonychus pratensis feeds by piercing plant cells to suck out the liquid within. Mites initially feed on lower leaves of plants and then move upward. Their feeding creates chlorotic spots on leaves, with severe cases resulting in leaf dieback or fruit that are undersized or fail to form. Plants suffering from water stress are especially vulnerable to O. pratensis.

The host plant range includes corn, turf grasses, sorghum and dates.

== Management ==
Oligonychus pratensis can be detected by looking for the mites themselves (which appear as small moving dots), their webbing or their feeding damage on plants. Mite monitoring should be done weekly when damage is suspected.

Miticides can be used to control O. pratensis. Their efficacy differs between this species and T. urticae, so it is important to distinguish these two species.

Not allowing plants to become water-stressed will reduce their vulnerability to mites. Drought-tolerant hybrid varieties of corn, when irrigated with suboptimal amounts of water, have lower mite populations than drought-susceptible corn under the same conditions.

Plant cultivars that are efficient at metabolising nitrogen have lower mite populations than those with poorer efficiency.

A range of natural enemies prey on O. pratensis. These include phytoseiid mites (Amblyseius scyphus, several species of Neoseiulus, Phytoseiulus persimilis), the spider Dictyna consulta, the predatory gall midge Feltiella macgregori, the convergent lady beetle Hippodamia convergens and the insidious flower bug Orius insidiosus. It can also be infected by the fungal pathogen Neozygites adjarica.

== Distribution ==
This species occurs in North America, South America and Africa.
