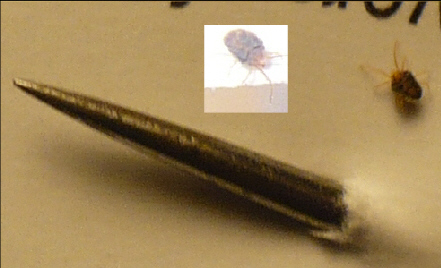
- Clover mite with sewing needle for scale

Scientific classification
- Kingdom: Animalia
- Phylum: Arthropoda
- Subphylum: Chelicerata
- Class: Arachnida
- Order: Trombidiformes
- Family: Tetranychidae
- Genus: Bryobia
- Species: B. praetiosa

Binomial name
- Bryobia praetiosa C. L. Koch, 1835

= Clover mite =

Species of mite

The clover mite (Bryobia praetiosa) is a species of mite. Clover mites are located worldwide across every continent except Antarctica. Clover mites usually reside in vegetation, rocks, or other common surfaces in which they typically feed on nearby foliage including, but not limited to clovers, dandelions, and other available plants.

== Description ==
Clover mites are oval-shaped arachnids, 0.75–0.85 mm (0.030–0.033 in) long, with a pair of long legs pointing forward often mistaken for antennae. They are reddish brown; the younger ones and the eggs are a bright red. They are extremely common in late spring in North America. They possess piercing-sucking mouthparts, used to consume plant sap.

== Ecology ==
Clover mites are polyphagous, feeding on a wide range of plants, including "lawn grasses, ornamental flowers, clover, dandelion, shepherd's purse, strawberry, daffodil, Salvia, Alyssum, and primrose". They are especially numerous in lawns with a heavy growth of succulent, well-fertilized grass. They do not cause any apparent harm to turf grass, but their feeding activity can turn the grass a silvery color and may stipple plants when heavy populations are present.

Clover mites reproduce parthenogenetically — their eggs do not need to be fertilized and are entirely female. Females lay about 70 eggs each. Clover mites undergo a six-legged larval stage and two eight-legged nymph stages before maturity.

Clover mites generally enter houses close to thick vegetation and can infiltrate houses in very large numbers through cracks and small openings around windows and doors, and are occasionally considered pests. Whether indoors or outside, clover mites are found more commonly in sunny areas than in darker areas. If "squished", they leave a characteristic red stain caused by their pigmentation.

Clover mites are not harmful to humans, pets, or furniture.

== Gallery ==
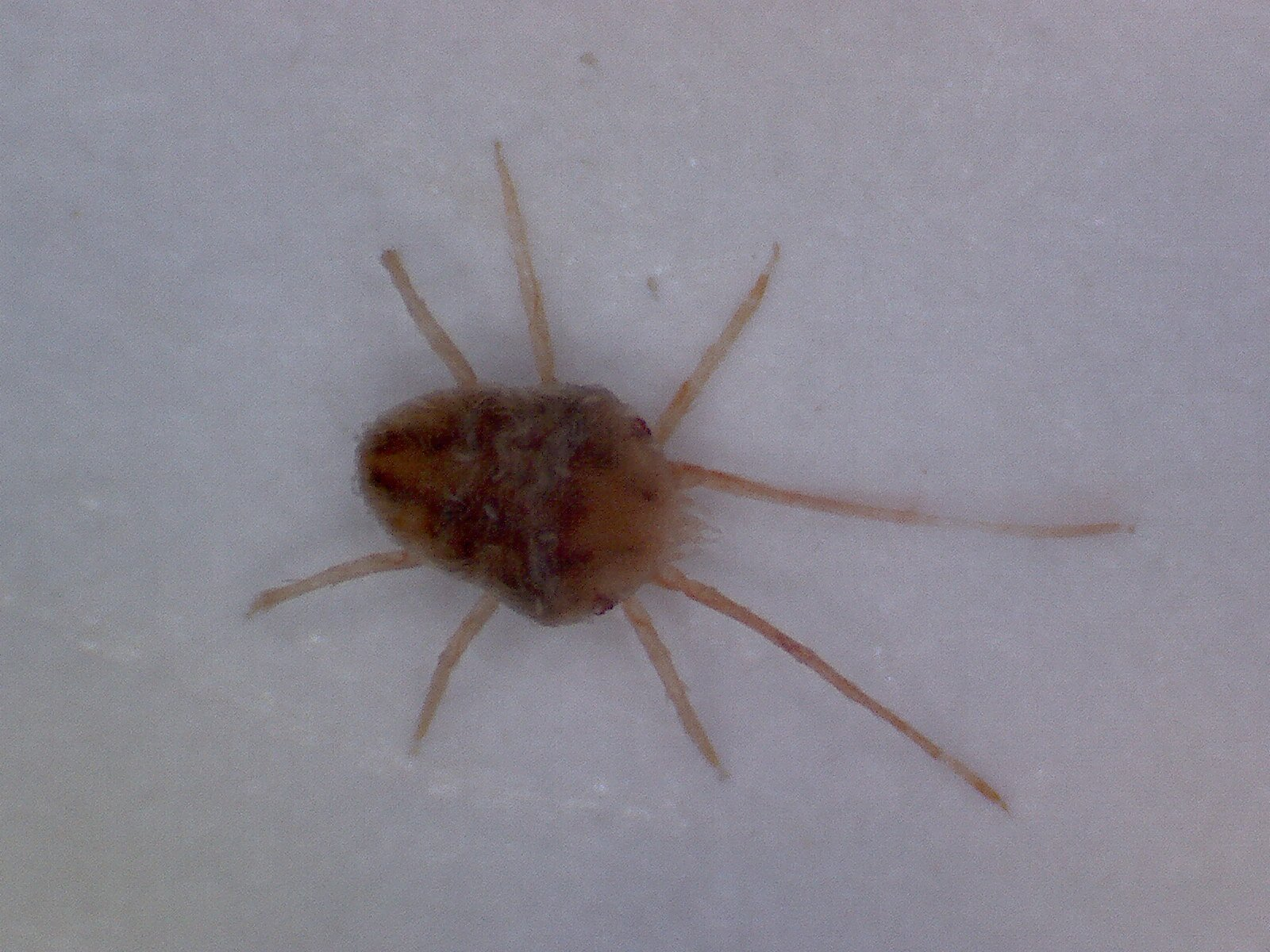
