= Mononychellus tanajoa =

Scientific classification
- Kingdom: Animalia
- Phylum: Arthropoda
- Subphylum: Chelicerata
- Class: Arachnida
- Order: Trombidiformes
- Family: Tetranychidae
- Genus: Mononychellus
- Species: M. tanajoa

Binomial name
- Mononychellus tanajoa (Bondar, 1938)

Species of spider mite

Mononychellus tanajoa, the cassava green mite, is a species of spider mite.
