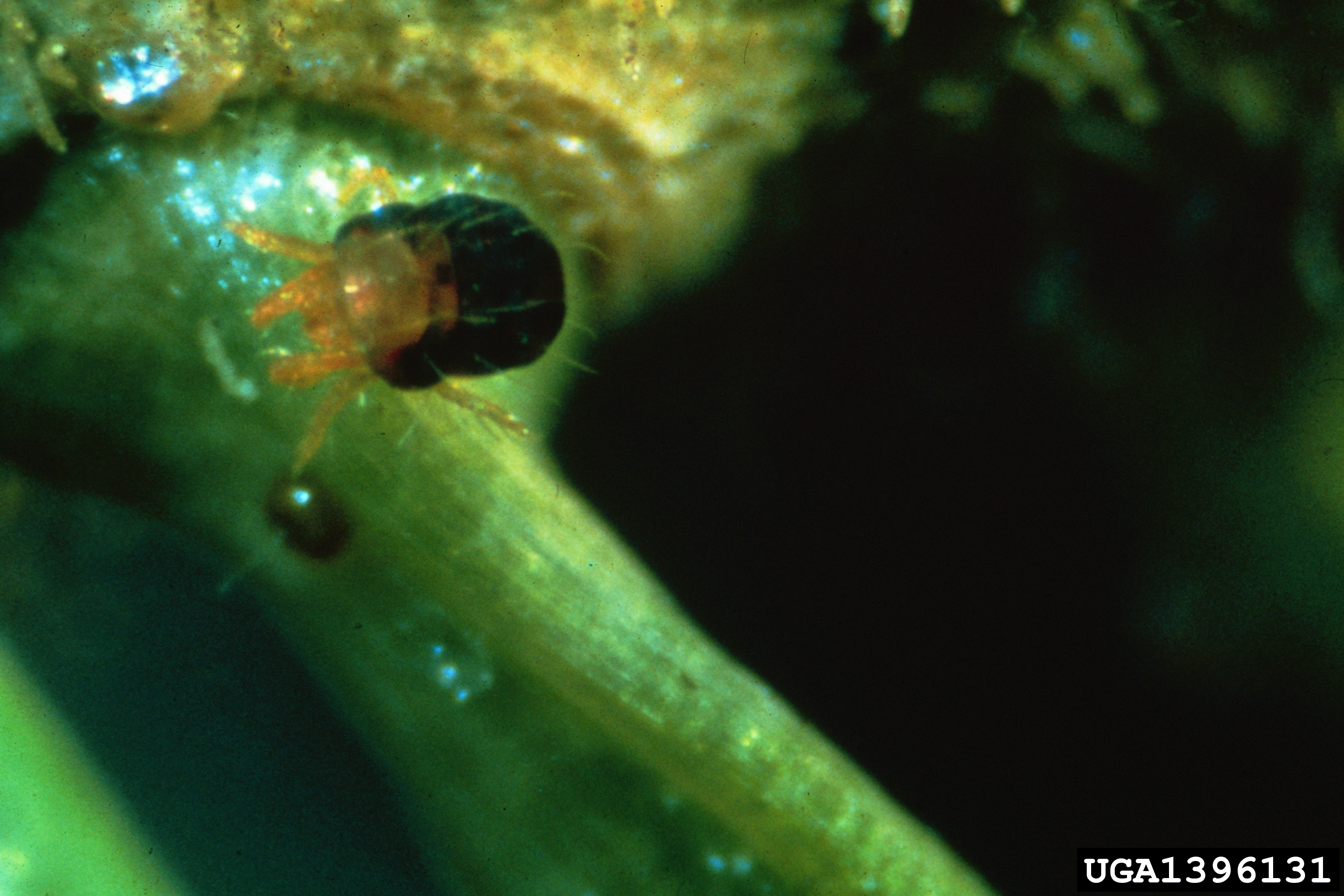
- A spruce spider mite

Scientific classification
- Kingdom: Animalia
- Phylum: Arthropoda
- Subphylum: Chelicerata
- Class: Arachnida
- Order: Trombidiformes
- Family: Tetranychidae
- Genus: Oligonychus
- Species: O. ununguis

Binomial name
- Oligonychus ununguis (Jacobi, 1905)

= Oligonychus ununguis =

Species of mite

Oligonychus ununguis, the spruce spider mite, is a globally widespread pest of spruce. Though not particularly important in the forest, it has been bothersome on planted spruce in the Prairie Provinces, and is considered one of the most important pests of spruce plantations in Ontario. As well, ornamental specimens of spruce and most other conifers throughout the range often suffer damage. The pest is barely visible without the aid of a magnifier and is rarely noticed until discoloured foliage is found on an affected tree. To check for the presence of mites, sharply jar suspected foliage over a piece of white paper, and watch for movement of tiny objects. If a red stain appears when the objects are smeared against the paper, the probability is high that spider mites are present.

Spruce spider mites suck sap from needles and shoots, causing the foliage to become mottled. The fine silk webbing that they spin as they move about the needles catches dust and further impairs the appearance of the host tree. Mites tend to become particularly numerous and destructive during hot dry seasons. Heavy infestations can lead to the death of seedlings and transplants. They are readily dispersed by wind and by the distribution of infected nursery stock.

The pest overwinters in the egg stage, mostly on the twigs. In the Prairie Provinces, the eggs hatch in May. The young, which to the layperson resemble the adult mite, develop into first generation adults by early June. By mid-June, the female, only about 0.5 mm long, lays 40 to 50 eggs on the foliage. These eggs give rise to a second generation of adult mites in late June, and 3 to 6 generations follow throughout summer and early fall. The overwintering eggs are laid from September to the onset of severe frost.
