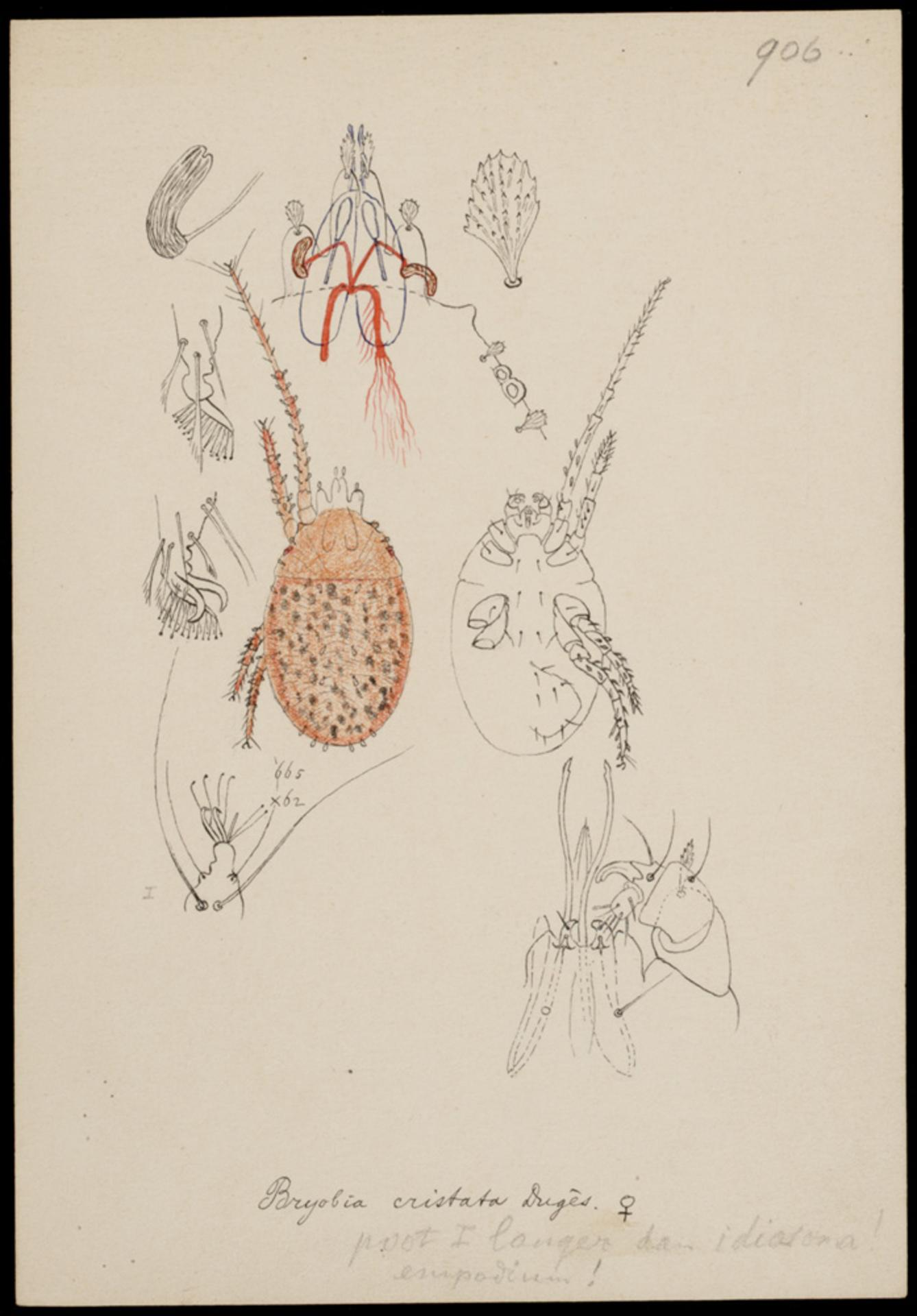
- (as B. cristata)

Scientific classification
- Kingdom: Animalia
- Phylum: Arthropoda
- Subphylum: Chelicerata
- Class: Arachnida
- Order: Trombidiformes
- Family: Tetranychidae
- Genus: Bryobia
- Species: B. graminum

Binomial name
- Bryobia graminum (Schrank, 1781)

Synonyms
- Acarus graminum Schrank, 1781; Acarus rufus Schrank, 1776; Bryobia amygdali Reck, 1947; Bryobia cristata (Dugès, 1834); Bryobia gloriosa Koch, 1836; Bryobia haustor (Hardy, 1850); Bryobia praetiosa Womersley, 1940; Bryobia zachvatkini Wainstein, 1956; Rhyncholophus haustor Hardy, 1850; Tetranychus cristatus Dugès, 1834

= Bryobia graminum =

Species of mite

Bryobia graminum, also known as the clover mite, is a species of mite with a cosmopolitan distribution.

It was first described in 1781 by Franz von Paula Schrank as Acarus graminum.

Its hosts are mainly herbaceous plants (grasses & daisies).

== Synonymy ==
Further synonymy is given in the Australian government funded Lucid key to mites.

- Bryobia cristata (Duges) Oudemans, 1905, synonymy Livshits & Mitrofanov, 1971
- Bryobia haustor (Hardy) Oudemans, 1937, synonymy Oudemans, 1937
