= Yellow mite =

The common name yellow mite may refer to any of the following species:

- Lorryia formosa (Tydeidae)
- Polyphagotarsonemus latus (Tarsonemidae)
- Tarsonemus translucens (Tarsonemidae)
- Oligonychus sacchari (Tetranychidae)
- Eotetranychus cendanai (Tetranychidae)
- Tetranychus urticae (Tetranychidae)
- Typhlodromalus peregrinus (Phytoseiidae)
