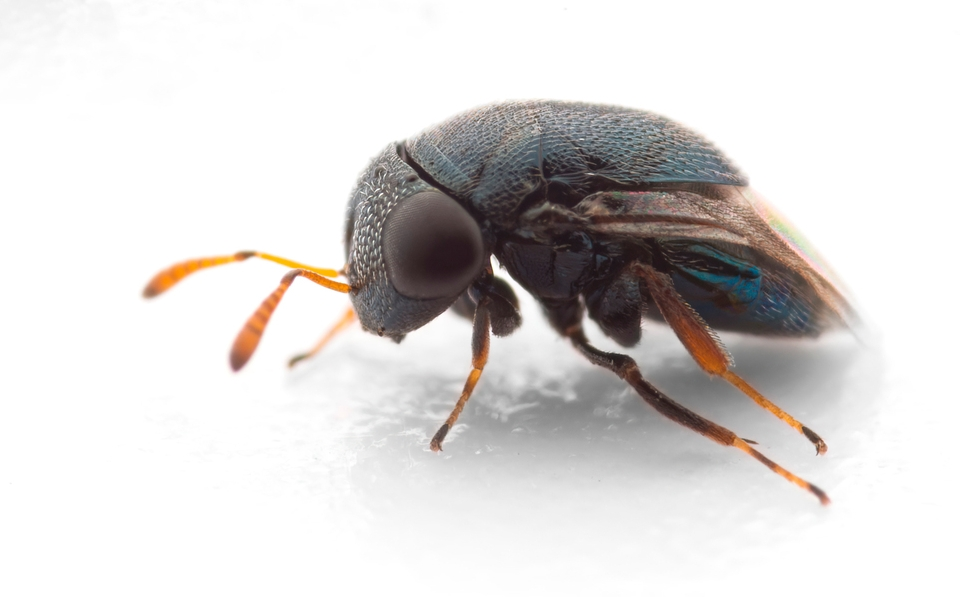
- Scutellista sp.

Scientific classification
- Kingdom: Animalia
- Phylum: Arthropoda
- Clade: Pancrustacea
- Class: Insecta
- Order: Hymenoptera
- Superfamily: Chalcidoidea
- Family: Eunotidae; Ashmead, 1904

= Eunotidae =

Family of wasps

Eunotidae is a family of chalcidoid wasps. In 2022, this family was described based on an analysis of a combination of molecular, morphological, and life history data.

== Description ==
Small parasitic wasps. Most species are known to be parasitoids of scale insects (Coccoidea).

== Taxonomy ==
Eunotidae contains the following genera:

- Butiokeras (Extinct)
- Cavitas
- Cephaleta
- Epicopterus
- Eunotus
- Mesopeltita
- Scutellista
