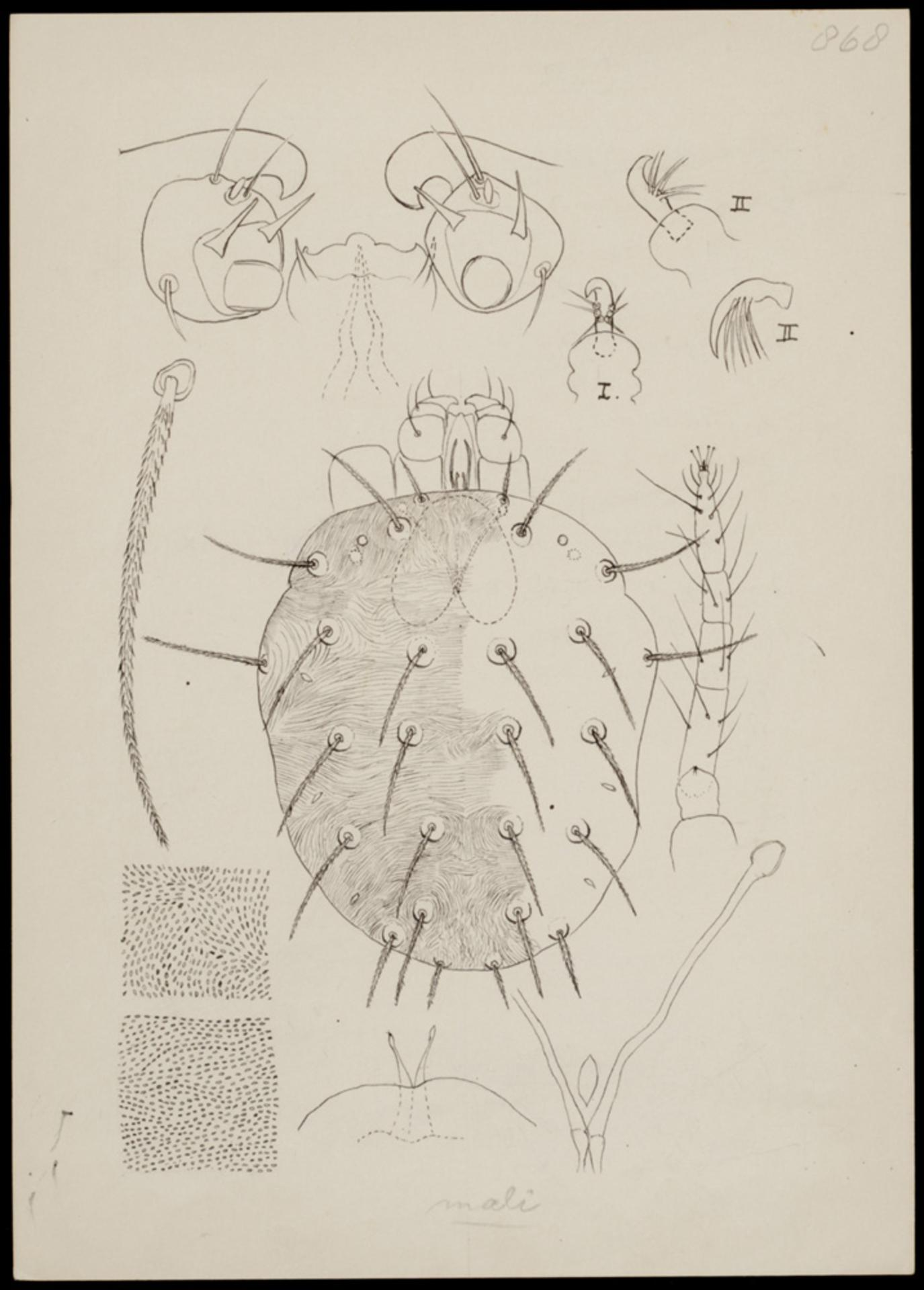

Scientific classification
- Kingdom: Animalia
- Phylum: Arthropoda
- Subphylum: Chelicerata
- Class: Arachnida
- Order: Trombidiformes
- Family: Tetranychidae
- Subfamily: Tetranychinae
- Genus: Panonychus; Yokoyama, 1929

= Panonychus =

Genus of mites

Panonychus is a genus of spider mites in the family Tetranychidae. There are about 16 described species in Panonychus.

== Species ==
These 16 species belong to the genus Panonychus:

- Panonychus akitanus Ehara, 1978^{c g}
- Panonychus bambusicola Ehara & Gotoh, 1991^{c g}
- Panonychus caglei Mellot, 1968^{c g}
- Panonychus caricae Hatzinikolis, 1984^{c g}
- Panonychus citri (McGregor, 1916)^{c g}
- Panonychus elongatus Manson, 1963^{c g}
- Panonychus globosus Tseng, 1974^{c g}
- Panonychus hadzhibejliae (Reck, 1947)^{c g}
- Panonychus inca Vis & Moraes, 2002^{c g}
- Panonychus lishanensis Tseng, 1990^{c g}
- Panonychus mori Yokoyama, 1929^{c g}
- Panonychus osmanthi Ehara & Gotoh, 1996^{c g}
- Panonychus pusillus (Ehara & Gotoh, 1987)^{c g}
- Panonychus spinigerus (Lucas, 1849)^{c g}
- Panonychus thelytokus Ehara & Gotoh, 1992^{c g}
- Panonychus ulmi (Koch, 1836)^{c g b} (European red mite)

Data sources: i = ITIS, c = Catalogue of Life, g = GBIF, b = Bugguide.net
