= Mononychellus =

Scientific classification
- Kingdom: Animalia
- Phylum: Arthropoda
- Subphylum: Chelicerata
- Class: Arachnida
- Order: Trombidiformes
- Family: Tetranychidae
- Subfamily: Tetranychinae
- Genus: Mononychellus; Wainstein, 1971

Genus of mites

Mononychellus is a genus of mites belonging to the family Tetranychidae.

The genus has almost cosmopolitan distribution.

Species:

- Mononychellus bondari (Paschoal, 1970)
- Mononychellus caribbeanae (McGregor, 1950)
- Mononychellus chapalensis Tuttle, Baker & Abbatiello, 1976
- Mononychellus chemosetosus (Paschoal, 1970)
- Mononychellus erythrinae Tuttle, Baker & Abbatiello, 1976
- Mononychellus eysenhardtiae Tuttle, Baker & Abbatiello, 1976
- Mononychellus flabellosetus (Beer & Lang, 1958)
- Mononychellus georgicus (Reck, 1948)
- Mononychellus heteromniae Meyer, 1987
- Mononychellus hispidosetus (Beer & Lang, 1958)
- Mononychellus hoffmannae Quiros de Gonzalez, Viloria & Carvajal, 1996
- Mononychellus hyptis Tuttle, Baker & Abbatiello, 1974
- Mononychellus lippiae (Meyer, 1974)
- Mononychellus manihoti Doreste, 1981
- Mononychellus mcgregori (Flechtmann & Baker, 1970)
- Mononychellus planki (McGregor, 1950)
- Mononychellus progresivus Doreste, 1981
- Mononychellus psidium (Estebanes & Baker, 1968)
- Mononychellus reevesi (Estebanes & Baker, 1968)
- Mononychellus siccus (Pritchard & Baker, 1955)
- Mononychellus tanajoa (Bondar, 1938)
- Mononychellus tephrosiae Tuttle, Baker & Abbatiello, 1974
- Mononychellus tunstalli (Meyer, 1974)
- Mononychellus vaalensis Meyer, 1987
- Mononychellus vilaricensis (Paschoal, 1971)
- Mononychellus virginiensis (McGregor, 1950)
- Mononychellus virosus (Meyer, 1974)
- Mononychellus wainsteini Tuttle, Baker & Abbatiello, 1974
- Mononychellus willardiae Tuttle, Baker & Abbatiello, 1976
- Mononychellus yemensis Meyer, 1996
