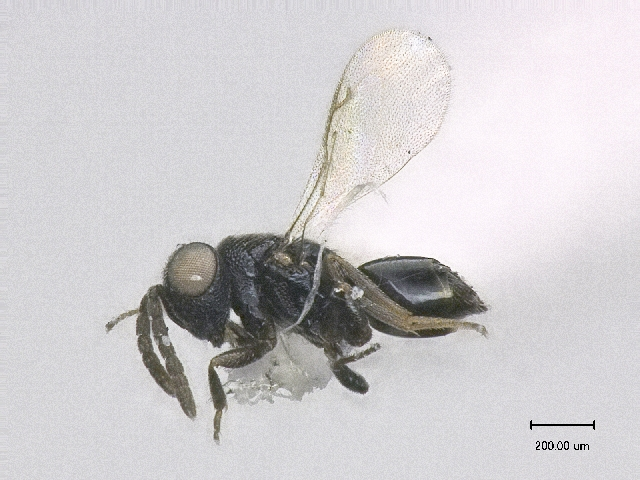
- Eunotus parvulus

Scientific classification
- Kingdom: Animalia
- Phylum: Arthropoda
- Class: Insecta
- Order: Hymenoptera
- Family: Eunotidae
- Subfamily: Eunotinae
- Genus: Eunotus; Walker, 1834

= Eunotus =

Genus of wasps

Eunotus is a genus of chalcid wasps. Most species are parasitoids of scale insects.

== Description ==
The antennae are inserted above the clypeal margin, and they consist of either four or five funicular segments. The thorax has a dense reticulate sculpture, with the frenal line on the scutellum usually being absent. The scutellum does not extend beyond the propodeum, and the propodeum has a distinct tooth-like median carina. The fore-wing is covered in fine hairs. The first gastral tergite covers most of the gaster.

== Taxonomy ==
The genus Eunotus includes the following species:

- Eunotus acutus Kurdjumov, 1912, a parasitoid of felt scales (Eriococcidae); found in the Palearctic.
- Eunotus aequalivena Xiao and Huang, 2001; found in the Peoples' Republic of China.
- Eunotus americanus Girault, 1915, a parasitoid of coccid scales; found in the United States of America.
- Eunotus antshar Nikolskaya, 1954, a parasitoid of coccid scales; found in Kazakhstan.
- Eunotus applanatus Xiao and Huang, 2001; found in the Peoples' Republic of China.
- Eunotus areolatus (Ratzeburg, 1852), a parasitoid of coccid scales; found in the Palearctic.
- Eunotus cretaceus Walker, 1834, a parasitoid of scale insects; found in Europe and the United States of America.
- Eunotus gossypii Risbec, 1951; found in Senegal.
- Eunotus hofferi Boucek, 1972; found in Czech Republic and Slovakia.
- Eunotus kocoureki Boucek, 1972; found in Bulgaria and Russia.
- Eunotus lividus Ashmead, 1892, a parasitoid of coccid scales; found in the Nearctic.
- Eunotus merceti Masi, 1931, a parasitoid of coccid scales (Pulvinaria vitis); found in Europe.
- Eunotus nigriclavis (Foerster, 1856), a parasitoid of scale insects; found in Europe and Iran.
- Eunotus obscurus Masi, 1931, a parasitoid of scale insects; found in the Palearctic.
- Eunotus orientalis Chumakova, 1956, a parasitoid of the mealybug Phenacoccus aceris; found in Russia.
- Eunotus parvulus Masi, 1931, a parasitoid of aphids; found in the Palearctic.
- Eunotus strenus Xiao and Huang, 2001; found in the Peoples' Republic of China.
