= Oligonychus sacchari =

Scientific classification
- Kingdom: Animalia
- Phylum: Arthropoda
- Subphylum: Chelicerata
- Class: Arachnida
- Order: Trombidiformes
- Family: Tetranychidae
- Genus: Oligonychus
- Species: O. sacchari

Binomial name
- Oligonychus sacchari (McGregor, 1942)

Synonyms
- Paratetranychus sacchari McGregor, 1942

Species of mite

Oligonychus sacchari, the sugarcane mite, yellow mite or sugarcane yellow mite, is a species of mite.

== Ecology ==
The main plant host for O. sacchari is sugar cane, but it also been observed on other grasses, including Bambusa arundinacea, Setaria italica, Sorghum arundinaceum, Sorghum halepense and Sorghum vulgare, and an orchid of the genus Dendrobium.

== Taxonomy ==
Oligonychus sacchari was first described by E. A. McGregor in 1942 under the name Paratetranychus sacchari. The type specimen was living on sugar cane on the island of Puerto Rico.
