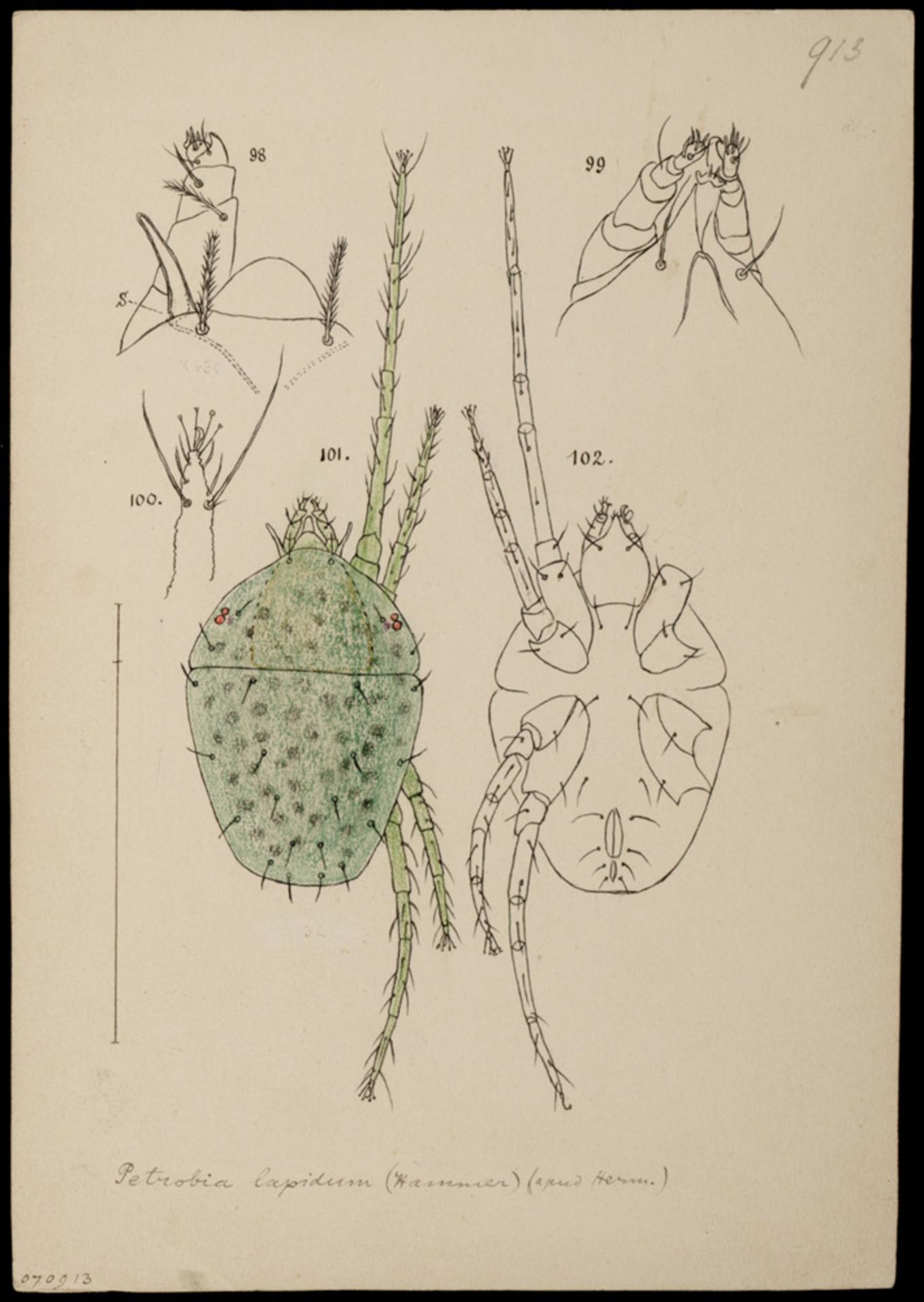

Scientific classification
- Kingdom: Animalia
- Phylum: Arthropoda
- Subphylum: Chelicerata
- Class: Arachnida
- Order: Trombidiformes
- Family: Tetranychidae
- Subfamily: Bryobiinae
- Genus: Petrobia; Murray, 1877

= Petrobia =

Genus of mites

Petrobia is a genus in Tetranychidae (spider mites), containing 34 described species. It includes some pest species.

== Description ==
Petrobia mites can be recognised by their reddish-brown cuticle, dark body contents and the first leg pair being very long. Each leg ends in pad-like claws and a hooked (uncinate) empodium with more than 1 pair of tenent hairs. The prodorsum of the body has three pairs of setae (ve, sci, sce) and there are no prominent lobes over the gnathosoma. The paranal setae (h2-3) are in a ventral position.

The genus is usually divided into three subgenera: Mesotetranychus, Petrobia and Tetranychina (sometimes one or more of these are considered separate genera). Mesotetranychus has simple peritremes whereas Petrobia has anastomosing peritremes. Tetranychina usually has long dorsal setae on small tubercles (other subgenera sometimes have tubercles as well, but their dorsal setae are short).

== Reproduction ==
Species of Petrobia may reproduce either sexually (e.g. P. harti) or asexually (e.g. P. latens).

In P. harti, males make up 10% or less of field populations. Eggs are laid on the ventral surfaces of host plant leaves.

Petrobia latens, on the other hand, has only female individuals. Females lay their eggs parthenogenetically on soil and under stones.

== Pests ==
Several Petrobia species are polyphagous plant pests, meaning they attack a wide range of plants:

- Petrobia apicalis attacks onions and various legumes in Europe and the United States.
- Petrobia harti attacks various weeds (especially Oxalis spp.) and also fruit and ornamental plants. It has been dispersed to most of the world.
- Petrobia latens attacks various fruit, vegetable and grain crops. It is one of the few spider mites proven to transmit barley yellow streak mosaic virus.
- Petrobia tunisiae attacks grains and chrysanthemum in Iran and the Mediterranean region.

== Species ==
These 34 species belong to the genus Petrobia:

- Petrobia apicalis Banks, 1917^{c g}
- Petrobia barkolensis Wang & Cui, 1992^{c g}
- Petrobia brevipes Reck & Bagdasarian, 1949^{c g}
- Petrobia californica Baker & Tuttle, 1994^{c g}
- Petrobia cardi Chaudhri, 1972^{c g}
- Petrobia carthagensis Auger & Flechtmann, 2009^{c g}
- Petrobia donnalucatensis Vacante, 1983^{c g}
- Petrobia dzhulfaensis Bagdasarian, 1960^{c g}
- Petrobia enodis Meyer, 1987^{c g}
- Petrobia haematoxylon Meyer, 1987^{c g}
- Petrobia harti (Ewing, 1909)^{c g b}
- Petrobia hemerocallis Wang, 1982^{c g}
- Petrobia hispaniola^{g}
- Petrobia jingheensis Ma & Gao, 1991^{c g}
- Petrobia latens (Müller, 1776)^{c g}
- Petrobia layyahensis Sabri & Afzal, 2008^{c g}
- Petrobia lippiae Baker & Tuttle, 1994^{c g}
- Petrobia lupini McGregor, 1950^{c g}
- Petrobia lycopersici Zaher, Gomaa & El-Enany, 1982^{c g}
- Petrobia marsai Manson, 1964^{c g}
- Petrobia mexicana Baker & Tuttle, 1983^{c g}
- Petrobia moutiai Baker & Pritchard, 1960^{c g}
- Petrobia nocitus Chaudhri, 1972^{c g}
- Petrobia phaceliae Tuttle & Baker, 1964^{c g}
- Petrobia prasadi Baker & Tuttle, 1994^{c g}
- Petrobia pseudotetranychina Auger & Flechtmann, 2009^{c g}
- Petrobia tribulus Chaudhri, 1972^{c g}
- Petrobia tunisiae Manson, 1964^{c g}
- Petrobia uncata (Flechtmann & Moraes, 1991)^{c g}
- Petrobia vachushtii Reck, 1948^{c g}
- Petrobia waltheriae Tuttle, Baker & Abbatiello, 1974^{c g}
- Petrobia xerophila Mitrofanov, 1975^{c g}
- Petrobia xinjiangensis Tan & Wang, 1992^{c g}
- Petrobia zachvatkini Reck & Bagdasarian, 1949^{c g}

Data sources: i = ITIS, c = Catalogue of Life, g = GBIF, b = Bugguide.net

== Identification ==
- Key to subgenera and to world species of subgenus Petrobia
- Key to world species of subgenus Mesotetranychus
