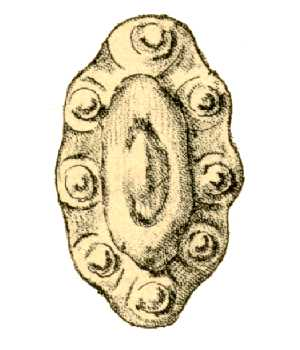
- Dorsal view with wax removed

Scientific classification
- Kingdom: Animalia
- Phylum: Arthropoda
- Clade: Pancrustacea
- Class: Insecta
- Order: Hemiptera
- Suborder: Sternorrhyncha
- Family: Coccidae
- Genus: Ceroplastes
- Species: C. ceriferus

Binomial name
- Ceroplastes ceriferus (Fabricius, 1798)

Synonyms
- List: Ceroplastes australiae Walker, 1852; Ceroplastes cerifera (Fabricius) Gill, 1988; Ceroplastes ceriferens (Anderson) De Lotto, 1965; Ceroplastes ceriferus (Anderson) Signoret, 1869; Ceroplastes vayssierei Mahdihassan, 1933; Coccus chilensis Gray, 1828; Coccus ceriferus Fabricius, 1798; Columnea cerifera (Fabricius) Targioni Tozzetti, 1866; Columnea chilensis (Gray) Targioni Tozzetti, 1866; Gascardia cerifera (Anderson); Lacca alba Signoret, 1869

= Ceroplastes ceriferus =

Species of scale insect

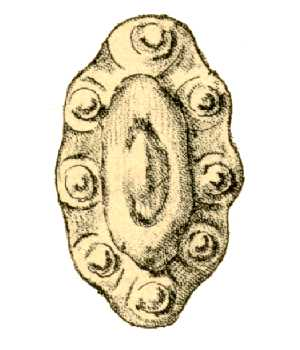
Indian Wax Scale

Ceroplastes ceriferus, the Indian wax scale, is a species of scale insect in the family Coccidae commonly found in India and China. It is native to southern Asia and has spread to many other parts of the world.

== Taxonomy ==
This species was first described in 1798 by the Danish botanist and entomologist Johan Christian Fabricius who gave it the name Coccus ceriferus. The type specimen came from India, probably occurring on Maytenus emarginata, however for nearly two hundred years the authorship was wrongly attributed to (James) Anderson. The insect was later transferred to the genus Ceroplastes, becoming Ceroplastes ceriferus.

== Description ==
The adult female Ceroplastes ceriferus is immobile, being permanently attached by its mouthparts to the plant on which it is feeding. The body is hidden under a roughly convex, circular or oval covering of wax which it has secreted; this is white in nymphs and young adults, and becomes pinkish in older individuals. Adults have a forward-pointing waxy horn and there are waxy filaments projecting from the margin of the scale, giving the insect a daisy-like appearance. In many populations, only females exist, giving birth by parthenogenesis.

== Ecology ==
Ceroplastes ceriferus is a polyphagous insect, meaning that it feeds on a wide variety of different plants. It has been recorded as utilising plants in 108 genera in 60 different families as hosts. These include such cultivated crops as apple, pear, plum, citrus, mango, tamarind, fig, pomegranate, avocado, tea, coffee, squash and pepper, as well as many ornamental plants.

== Wax ==
The wax secretions of Ceroplastes ceriferus have historically been harvested in China for use in candle-making, polishes, and as a sizing agent in papermaking. In August, tree branches encrusted with the secretions of the insect are cut off and boiled in water, separating the wax, which collects on the surface, and insects, which settles to the bottom. The wax is then remelted and poured into deep pans, where it is allowed to cool. The wax is pure-white or slightly-yellowish, tasteless, and odourless.

== Pest status ==
Ceroplastes ceriferus can occur on branches, twigs and foliage. It feeds on the sap of its host plant causing lack of vigour, wilting, shedding of leaves and dieback. On poplar, one of the main hosts, the bark is discoloured and peels off in patches. On ornamental plants the insects are unattractive, and the honeydew they copiously produce encourages the growth of sooty mould, which is both unsightly and blocks out the light, reducing photosynthesis.

== See also ==
- Scale insect
