= Eutetranychus =

Scientific classification
- Kingdom: Animalia
- Phylum: Arthropoda
- Subphylum: Chelicerata
- Class: Arachnida
- Order: Trombidiformes
- Family: Tetranychidae
- Subfamily: Tetranychinae
- Genus: Eutetranychus; Banks, 1917

Genus of mites

Eutetranychus is a genus of mites belonging to the family Tetranychidae.

The genus has almost cosmopolitan distribution.

Species:

- Eutetranychus acaciae Miller, 1966
- Eutetranychus africanus (Tucker, 1926)
- Eutetranychus anitae Estebanes & Baker, 1968
- Eutetranychus banksi (McGregor, 1914)
- Eutetranychus bilobatus Nassar & Ghai, 1981
- Eutetranychus bredini Baker & Pritchard, 1960
- Eutetranychus caricae Nassar & Ghai, 1981
- Eutetranychus carinae Meyer, 1974
- Eutetranychus citri Attiah, 1967
- Eutetranychus clastus Baker & Pritchard, 1960
- Eutetranychus concertativus Meyer, 1974
- Eutetranychus cratis Baker & Pritchard, 1960
- Eutetranychus eliei Gutierrez & Helle, 1971
- Eutetranychus enodes Baker & Pritchard, 1960
- Eutetranychus fici Meyer, 1987
- Eutetranychus guangdongensis Ma & Yuan, 1982
- Eutetranychus maximae Nassar & Ghai, 1981
- Eutetranychus mirpuriensis Chaudhri, Akbar & Rasool, 1974
- Eutetranychus nagai Nassar & Ghai, 1981
- Eutetranychus namibianus Meyer, 1987
- Eutetranychus neotranversus Kamran, Khan & Alatawi, 2018
- Eutetranychus nomurai Flechtmann, 1997
- Eutetranychus orientalis (Klein, 1936)
- Eutetranychus palmatus Attiah, 1967
- Eutetranychus pantopus (Berlese, 1910)
- Eutetranychus papayensis Iqbal & Ali, 2008
- Eutetranychus phaseoli Nassar & Ghai, 1981
- Eutetranychus pruni Smiley & Baker, 1995
- Eutetranychus pyri Attiah, 1967
- Eutetranychus rhusi Meyer, 1988
- Eutetranychus ricinus Smiley & Baker, 1995
- Eutetranychus sanaae Smiley & Baker, 1995
- Eutetranychus shii
- Eutetranychus swazilandicus Meyer, 1974
- Eutetranychus transverstriatus Smiley & Baker, 1995
- Eutetranychus xianensis Ma & Yuan, 1982
