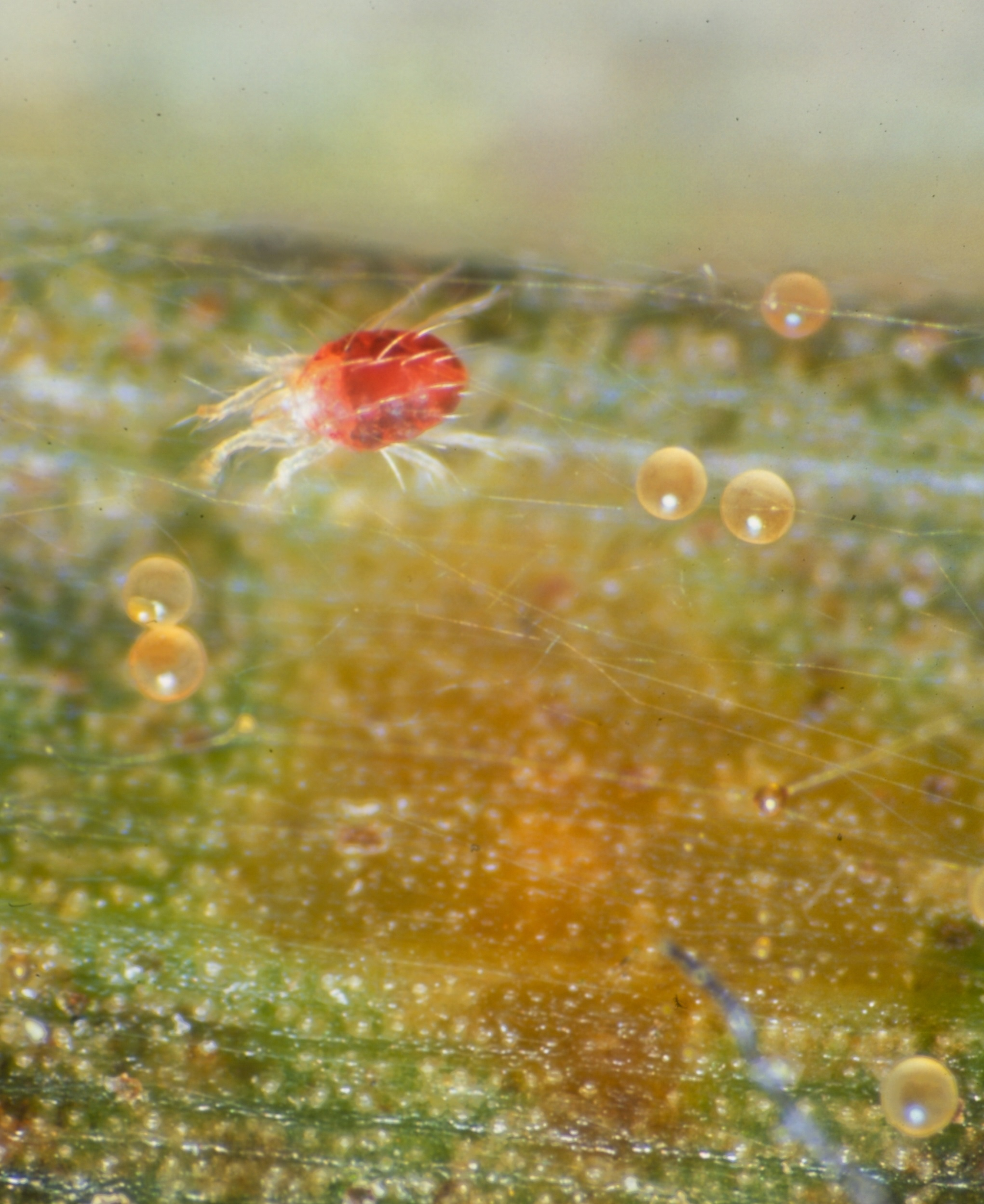
- Oligonychus velascoi

Scientific classification
- Kingdom: Animalia
- Phylum: Arthropoda
- Subphylum: Chelicerata
- Class: Arachnida
- Order: Trombidiformes
- Family: Tetranychidae
- Subfamily: Tetranychinae
- Genus: Oligonychus; Berlese, 1886

Species
- About 200

= Oligonychus =

Genus of mites

Oligonychus is a genus of mites in the family Tetranychidae, the spider mites. Many members of this genus are familiar pests of plants. There are about 200 described species.

Species include:

- Oligonychus aceris (maple spider mite), a pest of maples
- Oligonychus afrasiaticus (date palm spider mite), a major pest of the date palm in North Africa and the Middle East; also on grasses, including maize
- Oligonychus araneum (grasswebbing mite)
- Oligonychus bicolor (oak red mite), on oaks and other hardwood trees
- Oligonychus biharensis (cassava red mite), many cultivated fruits and ornamental plants
- Oligonychus coffeae (tea red spider mite), "considered to be the most serious pest of tea". Also a pest of coffee, cotton, and jute, and recorded on cashew, African oil palm, rubber, and several fruit crops
- Oligonychus coniferarum, a pest of many conifer trees used for Christmas trees
- Oligonychus gossypii (cotton red mite), cotton, fruits, beans, ornamentals
- Oligonychus ilicis (southern red mite, coffee red mite), a pest of many woody ornamentals, especially azaleas and camellias, first described from American holly (Ilex opaca)
- Oligonychus indicus (sugarcane red spider mite, sugarcane leaf mite), banana and grass crops
- Oligonychus litchii, grasses and palms
- Oligonychus mangiferus (mango spider mite), many fruit crops, sweet potato, cotton, ornamentals
- Oligonychus mcgregori, avocado, cassava, cotton, ornamentals
- Oligonychus milleri (pine spider mite), known from many species of pine
- Oligonychus oryzae (paddy leaf mite, rice leaf mite), a pest of rice
- Oligonychus palus, banana
- Oligonychus perditus, a pest of ornamental conifers, such as juniper bonsai
- Oligonychus perseae (persea mite), a top pest of avocado in California, also on ornamentals
- Oligonychus pratensis (Banks grass mite), corn, turfgrasses
- Oligonychus punicae (ash flower gall mite, avocado brown mite), a pest of avocado
- Oligonychus sacchari (sugarcane yellow mite), on sugarcane and other grasses
- Oligonychus shinkajii, grass crops such as rice, sugarcane, and bamboo
- Oligonychus thelytokus, some fruits, cassava, cotton, and ornamentals
- Oligonychus ununguis (spruce spider mite), a pest of conifers with a preference for spruces
- Oligonychus yothersi (avocado red mite), a pest of yerba mate and avocado
- Oligonychus zeae (maize spider mite), banana and grasses

== Gallery ==
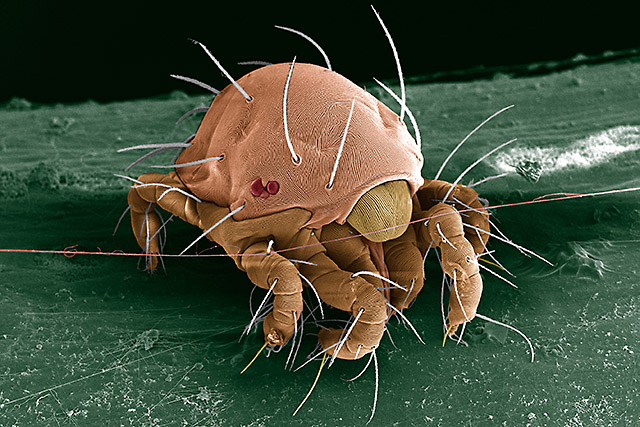
Oligonychus coniferarum

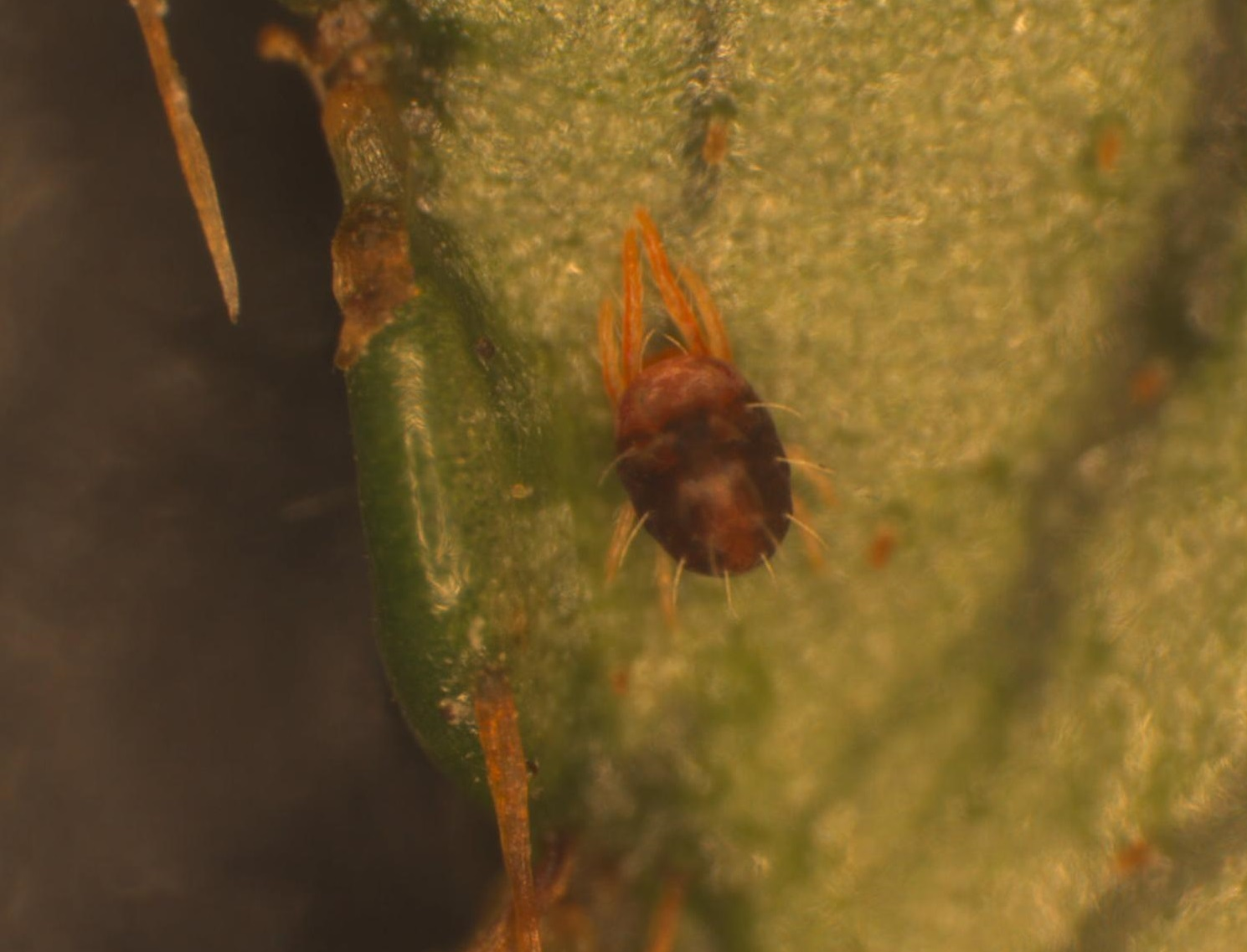
Oligonychus ilicis

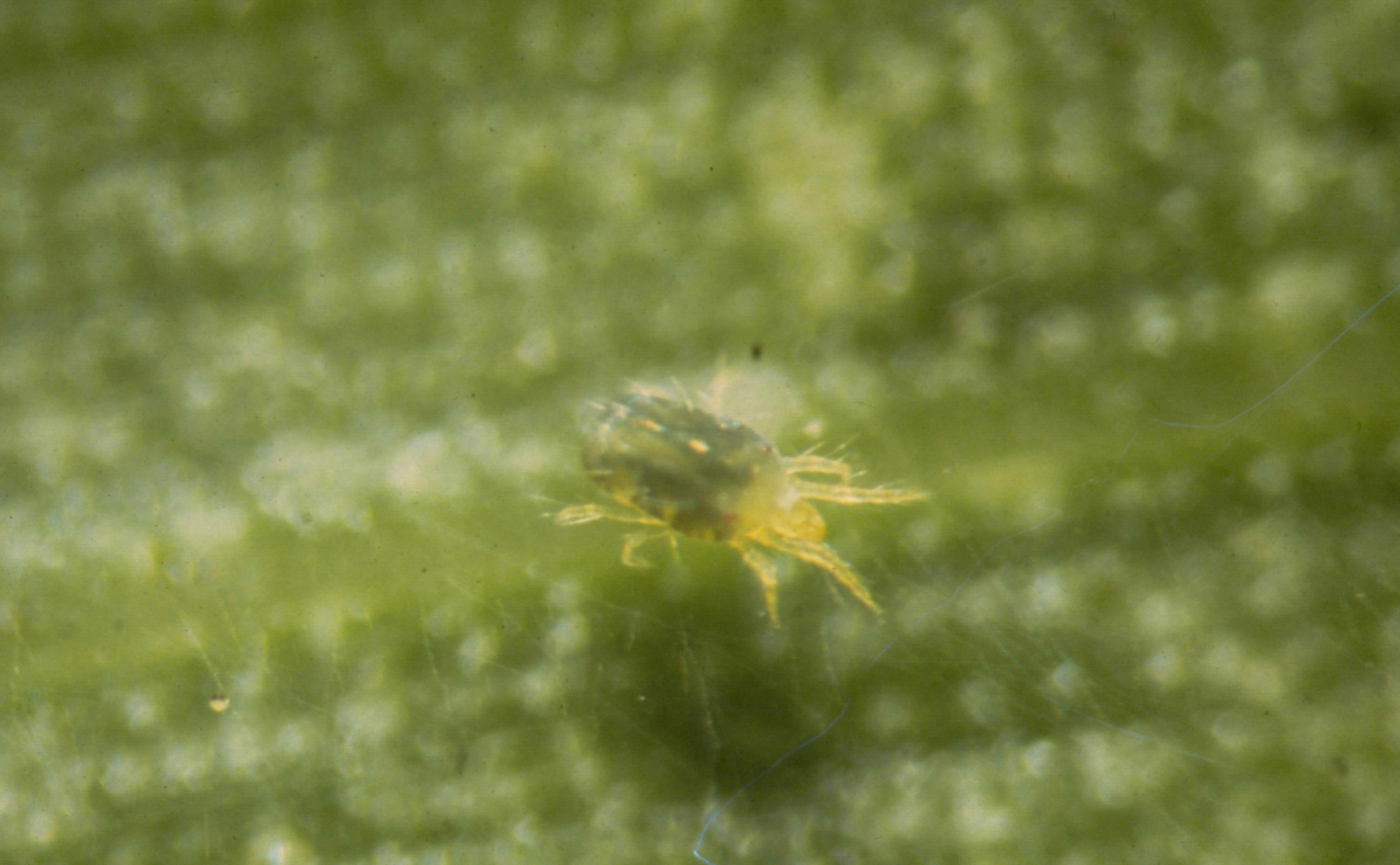
Oligonychus pratensis

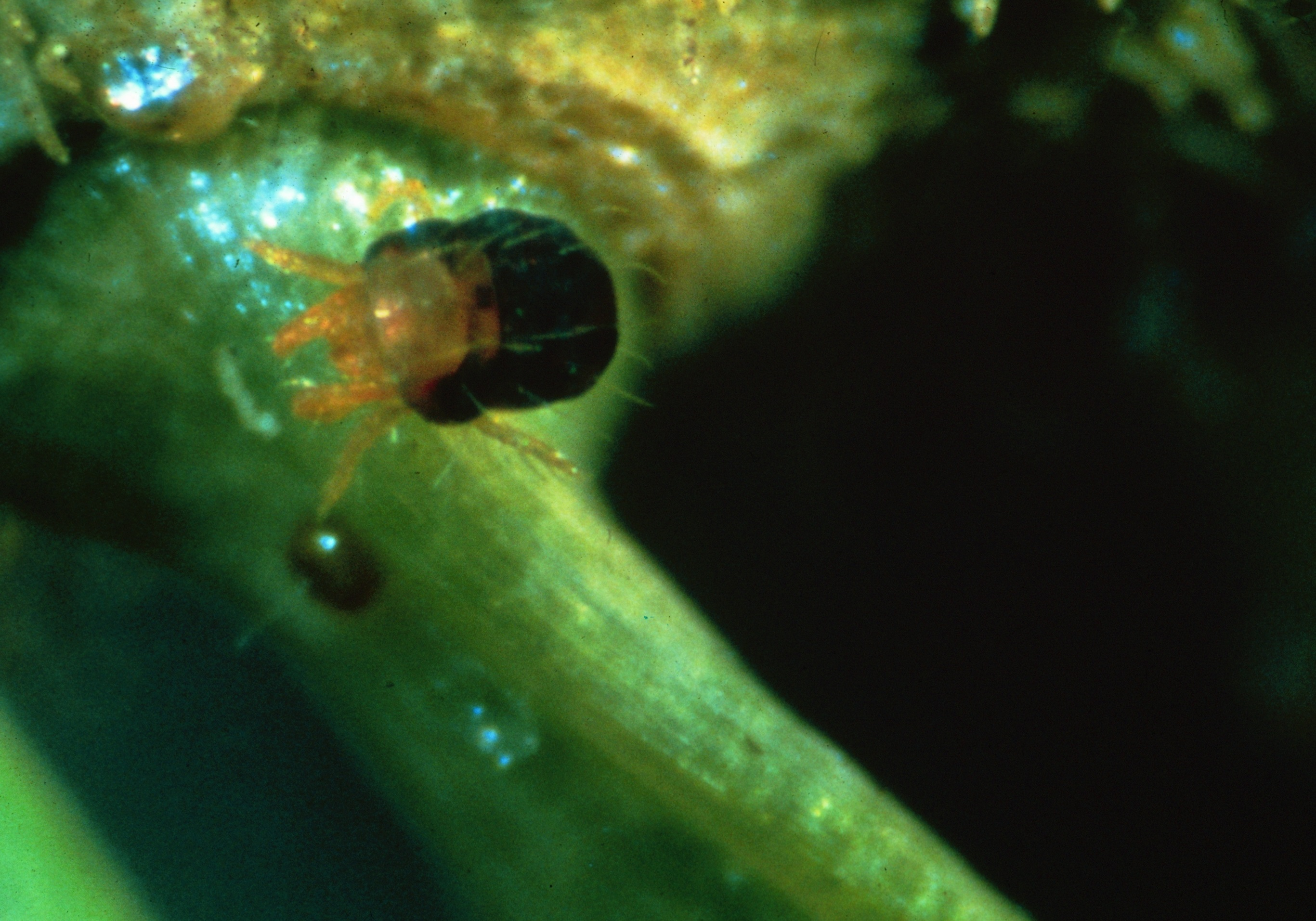
Oligonychus ununguis
