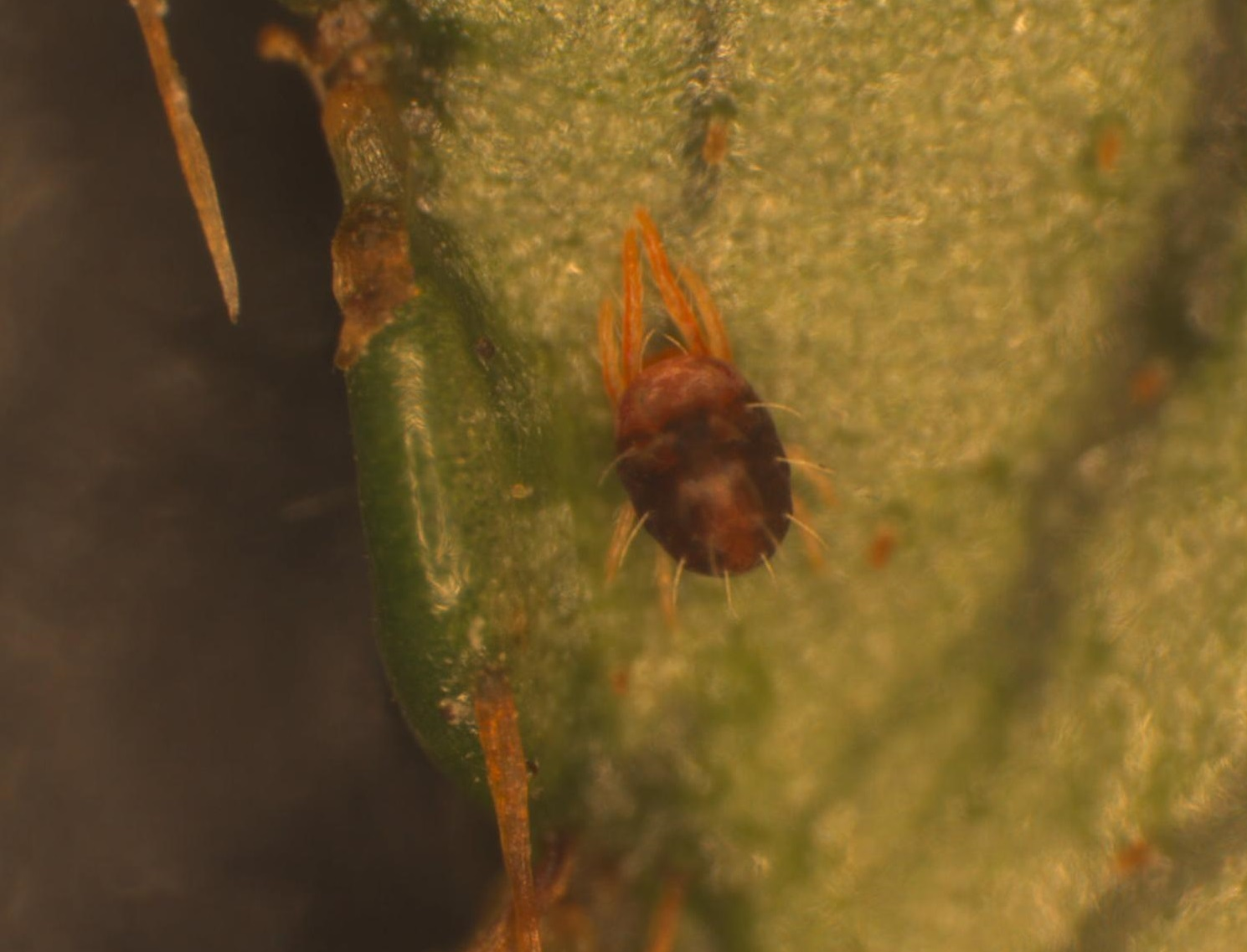

Scientific classification
- Kingdom: Animalia
- Phylum: Arthropoda
- Subphylum: Chelicerata
- Class: Arachnida
- Order: Trombidiformes
- Family: Tetranychidae
- Genus: Oligonychus
- Species: O. ilicis

Binomial name
- Oligonychus ilicis McGregor, 1916

= Oligonychus ilicis =

Species of mite

Oligonychus ilicis, the southern red mite, is a species of mite found in the family Tetranychidae. It is a pest found throughout the world, targeting heather and holly.

== Description ==
Eggs are found on the underside of leaves. Eggs in the summer are darker than eggs in the winter.

Larvae are slightly larger than eggs and have six legs, unlike the adults which have eight.

Adults are around 0.5 millimeters (0.020 in) in length. They are red or brown in coloration, darker than other species of spider mite. Their bodies are ovular-shaped.

The mites leave stippling or bronzing on leaves of plants.

== Life history ==
Oligonychus ilicis goes through several generations in a year. The species targets broad-leaved evergreens, particularly of the families Ericaceae and Aquifoliaceae.

There are two nymph stages with the succeeding stage darker and larger than the proceeding.

Population densities are highest in autumn and spring. In the summer, the mites undergo aestivation.

== Distribution ==
The species is known from Brazil, Italy, Japan, Korea, the Netherlands, Paraguay, and United States.

== Discovery ==
The species was described from a specimen found on an American holly in Batesburg, South Carolina.
