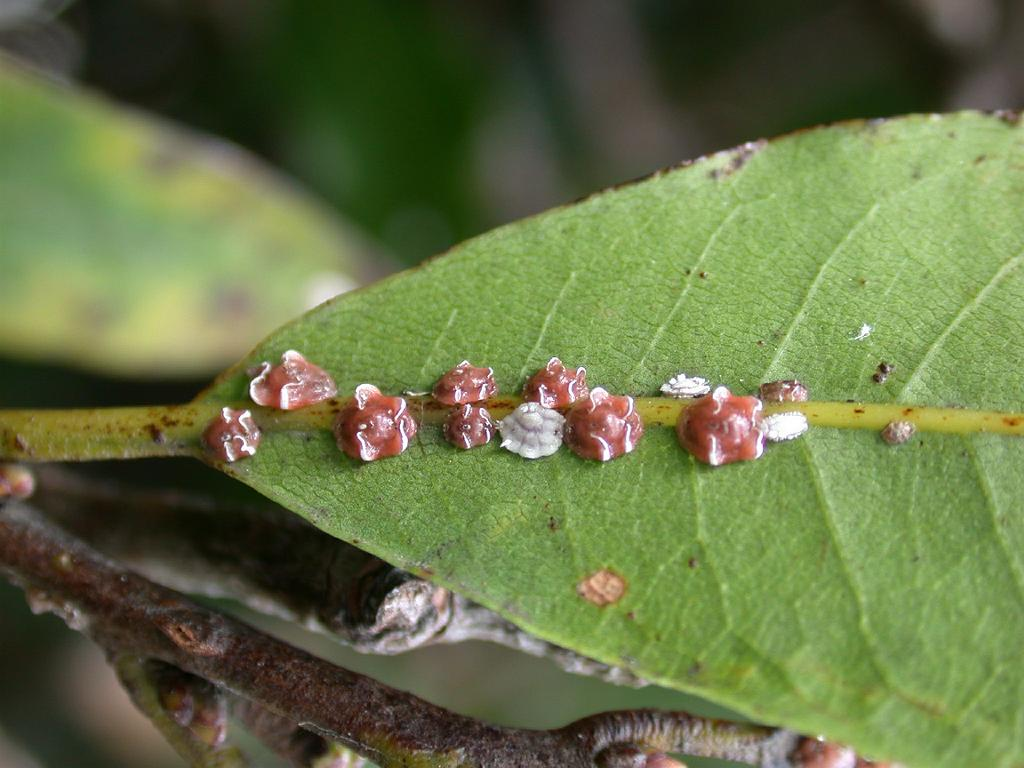
- red wax scale on the leaves of Laurus nobilis

Scientific classification
- Domain: Eukaryota
- Kingdom: Animalia
- Phylum: Arthropoda
- Class: Insecta
- Order: Hemiptera
- Suborder: Sternorrhyncha
- Family: Coccidae
- Genus: Ceroplastes
- Species: C. rubens

Binomial name
- Ceroplastes rubens Maskell, 1839

= Ceroplastes rubens =

Species of true bug

Ceroplastes rubens, known generally as the red wax scale or pink wax scale, is a species of soft scale insect in the family Coccidae. It is native to Australia but has been introduced to other countries, including New Caledonia, Japan, China, Poland and the United States.

== Description ==
Adult females of C. rubens are covered in a hard, pink/pale red covering of wax. With this covering, they are about 3-4 mm long, globular and smooth in shape, with a depression on the top and two lobes on each side. They have stigmatic setae of two types (bullet-like and hemispherical), and there are two pair of setae between the antennae.

Eggs of this species are brick red. These hatch into crawlers, the first nymphal instar, which have three pairs of legs, two eye spots and a pair of antennae. Later nymphal instars are covered in wax like the adult female, though their wax is initially white.

== Life cycle ==
Red wax scales begin their lives as eggs, which are held in a cavity under the mother's body. Eggs hatch into mobile crawlers, which eventually settle down on the host plant, moult into the next instar and begin feeding.

== Diet ==
Ceroplastes rubens feeds on the sap of plant shoots, leaves and fruit stalks, sucking it out using a proboscis.

In Australia, its host range includes avocado, citrus, custard apple, longan, mango, and many native shrubs (Callistemon, lillypilly, Pittosporum, umbrella tree) and exotic ornamental plants (e.g. Ixora).

In China, it infests over 40 species in 24 families, with its preferred hosts including Camellia, Cedrus deodara, Cinnamomum, citrus, Ilex cornuta, Magnolia and pine.

== Pest status ==
This scale insect causes damage described as "minor and frequent". Like other scale insects, it excretes sugary honeydew which covers leaves, promoting the growth of sooty mould. Sooty mould reduces light needed for photosynthesis and can also spoil the appearance of fruit.
