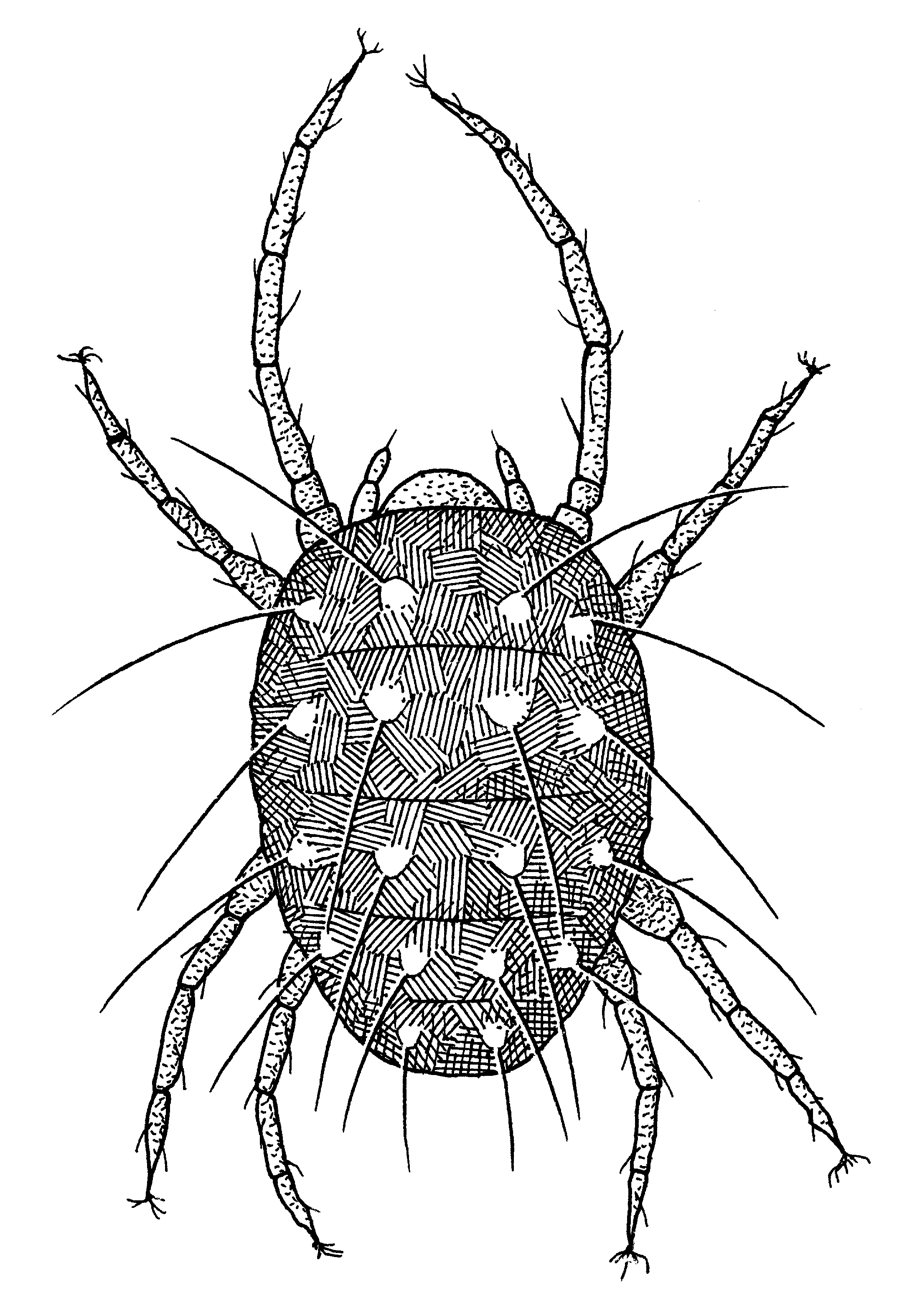
- Aca (mite).png

Scientific classification
- Kingdom: Animalia
- Phylum: Arthropoda
- Subphylum: Chelicerata
- Class: Arachnida
- Order: Trombidiformes
- Family: Tetranychidae
- Genus: Panonychus
- Species: P. ulmi

Binomial name
- Panonychus ulmi (Koch, 1836)

= Panonychus ulmi =

Species of mite

Panonychus ulmi, the European red mite, is a species of mite which is a major agricultural pest of fruit trees. It has a high reproductive rate, a short generation time (21 days at 20 °C or 68 °F) and produces many broods in a year, all of which contribute to its pest status. It has a cosmopolitan distribution, and a very wide host range, having been found on the following plants:

- Acacia longifolia
- Aesculus hippocastanum
- Alnus glutinosa
- Alnus incana
- Amaranthus
- Amelanchier
- Artocarpus heterophyllus
- Atropa belladonna
- Avena sativa
- Betula pubescens
- Betula verrucosa
- Calystegia sepium
- Camellia sinensis
- Castanea sativa
- Chenopodium
- Citrus aurantiifolia
- Citrus aurantium
- Citrus grandis
- Convolvulus arvensis
- Corylus avellana
- Cotoneaster tomentosus
- Crataegus monogyna
- Crataegus succulenta
- Cucumis
- Cucurbita maxima
- Cucurbita pepo
- Cydonia oblonga
- Dalbergia sissoo
- Daucus carota
- Desmodium canescens
- Diospyros
- Eriobotrya japonica
- Fagus sylvatica
- Ficus carica
- Fragaria vesca
- Frangula alnus
- Fraxinus excelsior
- Gardenia jasminoides
- Hibiscus
- Hydrangea macrophylla
- Juglans regia
- Juncus maritimus
- Laburnum alpinum
- Lonicera japonica
- Malus domestica
- Malva
- Medicago sativa
- Morus nigra
- Myrica pensylvanica
- Petroselinum crispum
- Phaseolus
- Phlox
- Polygonum aviculare
- Populus tremula
- Potentilla fruticosa
- Prunus americana
- Prunus armeniaca
- Prunus avium
- Prunus cerasus
- Prunus chinensis
- Prunus divaricata
- Prunus domestica
- Prunus dulcis
- Prunus institia
- Prunus padus
- Prunus persica
- Prunus spinosa
- Pyracantha
- Pyrus baccata
- Pyrus communis
- Pyrus pyrifolia
- Pyrus sargentii
- Quercus
- Rhamnus frangula
- Ribes aureum
- Ribes sanguineum
- Robinia pseudoacacia
- Rosa canina
- Rosa multiflora
- Rosa palustris
- Rubus idaeus
- Rubus occidentalis
- Rumex obtusifolius
- Salix alba
- Salix caprea
- Sapindus saponaria
- Sasa kurilensis
- Sophora japonica
- Sorbus aria
- Sorbus aucuparia
- Sorbus chrysophylla
- Sorbus conradina
- Sorbus fennica
- Sorbus hostii
- Sorbus scandica
- Sorghum halepense
- Symphoricarpos foetidus
- Syzygium
- Tilia cordata
- Trifolium pratense
- Triticum aestivum
- Ulmus americana
- Ulmus campestris
- Ulmus glabra
- Ulmus hollandica
- Ulmus procera
- Ulmus rubra
- Ulmus scabra
- Vicia sativa
- Vitis labrusca
- Vitis vinifera
- Wisteria sinensis
- Zea mays

Panonychus ulmi was first described by Carl Ludwig Koch in 1836, under the name Tetranychus ulmi. It has also been known under a number of synonyms:

- Tetranychus ulmi Koch, 1836
- Oligonychus ulmi : Hirst, 1920
- Metatetranychus ulmi : Oudemans, 1931
- Paratetranychus ulmi : André, 1937
- Panonychus ulmi : Ehara, 1956
- Tetranychus pilosus Canestrini & Fanzago, 1876
- Paratetranychus pilosus : Zacher, 1913
- Metatetranychus pilosus : Oudemans, 1931
- Paratetranychus pilosus alboguttatus Zacher, 1913
- Tetranychus alboguttatus Zacher, 1913
- Metetetranychus alboguttatus : Oudemans, 1931
- Paratetranychus pilosus occidentalis McGregor & Newcomer, 1928
- Oligonychus alni Oudemans, 1929
- Metatetranychus alni : Oudemans, 1931
- Oligonychus muscorum Oudemans, 1929
- Metatetranychus muscorum : Oudemans, 1931
- Oligonychus potentillae Oudemans, 1929
- Metatetranychus potentillae : Oudemans, 1931
- Metatetranychus mali Oudemans, 1931
- Metatetranychus canestrinii Oudemans, 1939
