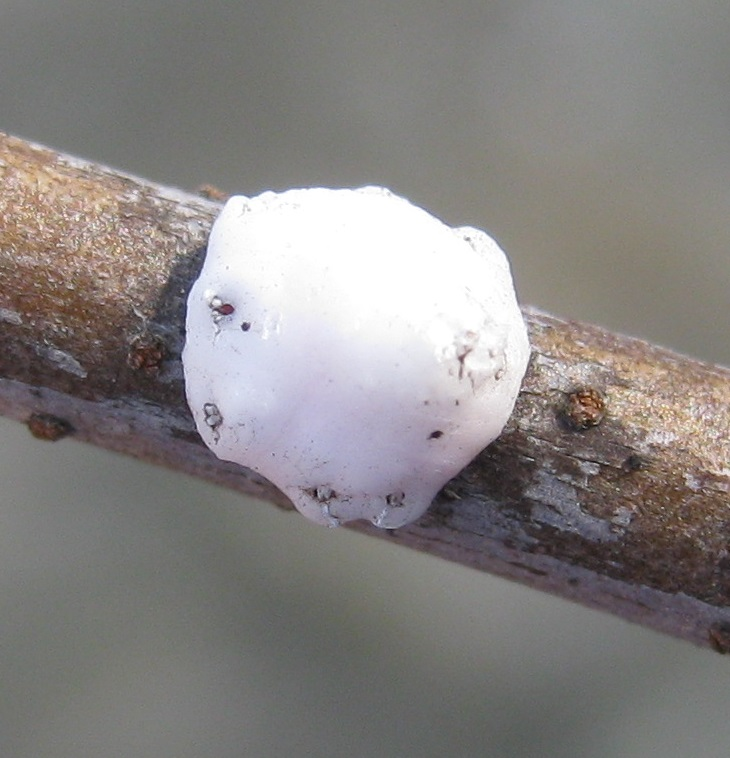
- Scale on arrowwood (Viburnum dentatum)

Scientific classification
- Domain: Eukaryota
- Kingdom: Animalia
- Phylum: Arthropoda
- Class: Insecta
- Order: Hemiptera
- Suborder: Sternorrhyncha
- Family: Coccidae
- Genus: Ceroplastes
- Species: C. cirripediformis

Binomial name
- Ceroplastes cirripediformis Comstock, 1881

= Ceroplastes cirripediformis =

Species of true bug

Ceroplastes cirripediformis, known generally as the barnacle scale or barnacle wax scale, is a species of soft scale insect in the family Coccidae.
