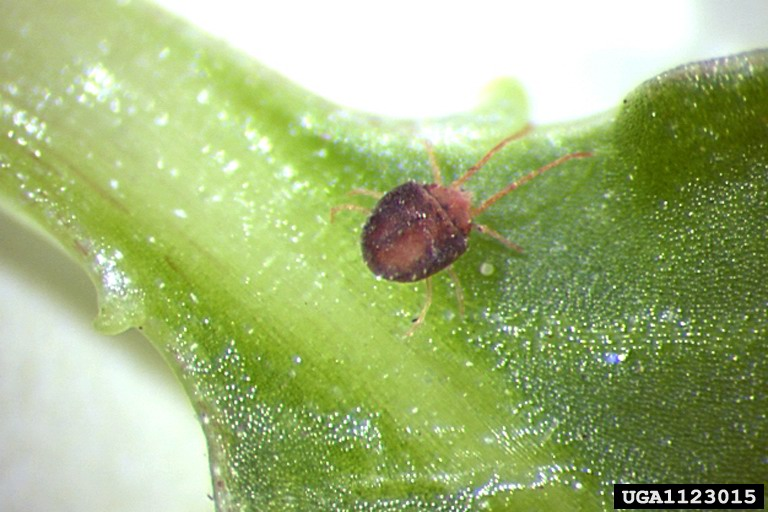

Scientific classification
- Kingdom: Animalia
- Phylum: Arthropoda
- Subphylum: Chelicerata
- Class: Arachnida
- Order: Trombidiformes
- Family: Tetranychidae
- Tribe: Bryobiini
- Genus: Bryobia; Koch, 1836

Species
- see text

= Bryobia =

Genus of mites

Bryobia is a genus of mites in the spider mite family Tetranychidae. The taxonomy of the genus is difficult. The genus has been revised several times. It is difficult to distinguish these tiny species from each other on the basis of morphological characters, and there is little agreement on which characteristics are of importance. Also, species can be variable in morphology. Over 130 species have been described, but many of the names are likely synonyms.

== Description ==
Bryobia mites are among the largest spider mites. The adult is visible to the naked eye. Mites of this genus are mainly distinguished by the arrangement of the setae on their bodies. In general, these mites are red in color with whitish setae and long legs with hooked claws.

== Biology ==
Bryobia mites feed on plants. They puncture the plant tissues with their sucking mouthparts. They are often found on leaves, but they also live on branches and twigs.

The life history is variable across species. Typically, it takes about a month for a mite to develop from egg and larva to adult. This depends on environmental conditions such as temperature and humidity. Some species overwinter in the egg stage. Some species have a single generation per year, while others have several. The eggs are laid singly or in clutches, and some mites may cover the eggs with dust or other matter. Unlike some other spider mites, bryobia mites do not spin webs.

The great majority of Bryobia mites are asexual (although certain species do reproduce sexually). Their populations are all female, and individuals reproduce by thelytoky, a form of parthenogenesis. They emerge from unfertilized eggs. Phylogenetic analysis shows that the asexual species in the genus are not a monophyletic group; indicating that asexual reproduction evolved several times or that sexuality re-evolved. The asexual species have a high level of genetic diversity considering that they are clones; this may have arisen through hybridization and mutation. In at least two species, namely Bryobia kissophila and B. praetiosa, asexuality is caused by the parasitic bacterium Wolbachia. This bacterium causes functional apomixis in the mites, so that a female produces only offspring that are identical to her. It is possible that Wolbachia could influence the reproductive processes of most bryobia mite species.

== Familiar species ==
Perhaps the best known species is Bryobia praetiosa, the clover mite or brown clover mite, an economically important pest of over 250 species of plants. It occurs nearly worldwide. Like other bryobia mites, this species is herbivorous, but there have been occasional reports of it occurring as an ectoparasite on humans, particularly children. It causes an itchy skin irritation. There has also been an isolated case report of an infestation in a domestic cat.

- Bryobia artemisiae lives on wormwoods and causes a gray discoloration of the leaves.
- Bryobia attica feeds on olive.
- Bryobia convolvulus is commonly found on field bindweed (Convolvulus arvensis), and it is also a pest of alfalfa.
- Bryobia cristata is reported from nearly every continent. It occurs on many grasses, including wheat and barley. It is also found on azalea, spiderwort, clover, and alfalfa. In Iceland it infests hayfields and it can also be found living inside houses.
- Bryobia graminum is a pest of fruit trees, clover, and grasses across Europe, Africa, Asia, and elsewhere, and of daisies, and in Australia and New Zealand.
- Bryobia kissophila is a familiar pest of common ivy (Hedera helix). It causes yellowing of the leaves. It sometimes lives in greenhouses. It is also known from potato crops. It is found in Europe, New Zealand, Australia, and elsewhere.
- Bryobia lagodechiana may invade greenhouses and it infests beans, cucumbers, currants, and several other cultivated plants. It is known from Europe to Canada to Japan.
- Bryobia rubrioculus damages fruit trees, especially almond. It causes discoloration of the bark and leaves. On apricot it causes spotting of the fruit. It is a pest of vineyards in the Pacific Northwest of the United States.
- Bryobia vasiljevi occurs on a variety of crops, including apples, asparagus, and wheat, in Australia, New Zealand, and elsewhere.
- Bryobia watersi has been found on mallow, cucumber, peanut, and Bermuda grass.
