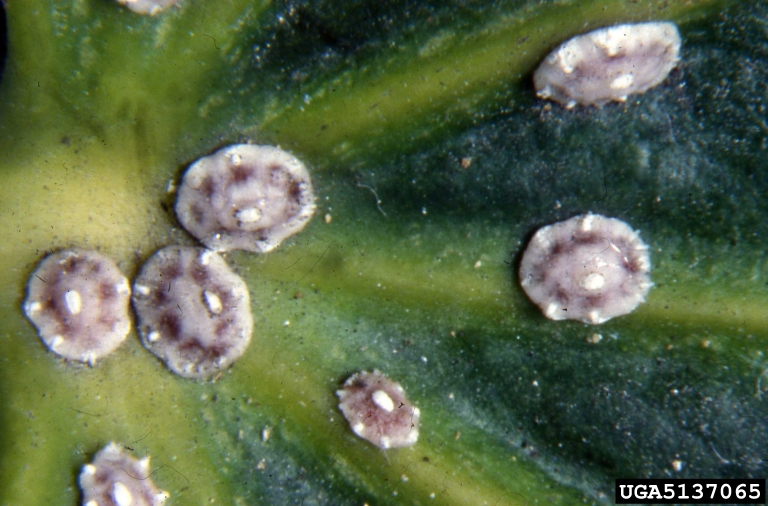

Scientific classification
- Kingdom: Animalia
- Phylum: Arthropoda
- Clade: Pancrustacea
- Class: Insecta
- Order: Hemiptera
- Suborder: Sternorrhyncha
- Family: Coccidae
- Genus: Ceroplastes
- Species: C. japonicus

Binomial name
- Ceroplastes japonicus Green, 1921

Synonyms
- Ceroplastes floridensis japonicus; Ceroplastes floridensis var. japonicus

= Ceroplastes japonicus =

Species of insect

Ceroplastes japonicus, also known as the Japanese wax scale or tortoise wax scale, is a scale insect belonging to the family Coccidae. It is native to East Asia but has spread and became a pest in Europe and West Asia.

== Description ==
Eggs of Ceroplastes japonicus are smaller than 0.5 millimeters (0.020 in).

Juveniles anchor themselves into plants, though are mobile for a few days after hatching.

Adults are around 1.75 to 4.2 millimeters (0.069 to 0.165 in) in length and gray or pink-white in color.

The insects produce a distinctive smell, produced by butyric acid, linalool, vanillin, 2-methylbutyric acid, and 3-methylbutyric acid.

== Life history ==
Ceroplastes japonicus have one generation per year. Eggs are laid in May to July and hatch from June to August. The insects become adults around mid-October or September in Russia. The mating season lasts until late-October. Adult males are generally short-lived and die after mating while females are capable of overwintering.

== Distribution ==
Ceroplastes japonicus is native to East Asia. They were accidentally spread in Europe and Western Asia, spreading throughout several nations. Ceroplastes japonicus specimens have also been reported in the United States and the United Kingdom, but do not have an established population. They are a pest to ornamental plants in Northern and Central Italy and Zhejiang and agricultural plants in Georgia and Southern Russia.
