= Edella =

Scientific classification
- Domain: Eukaryota
- Kingdom: Animalia
- Phylum: Arthropoda
- Subphylum: Chelicerata
- Class: Arachnida
- Order: Trombidiformes
- Family: Tetranychidae
- Genus: Edella
- Species: E. clava

Binomial name
- Edella clava Meyer, 1974

Genus of mites

Edella is a genus of spider mites in the family Tetranychidae. There is at least one described species in Edella, E. clava.
