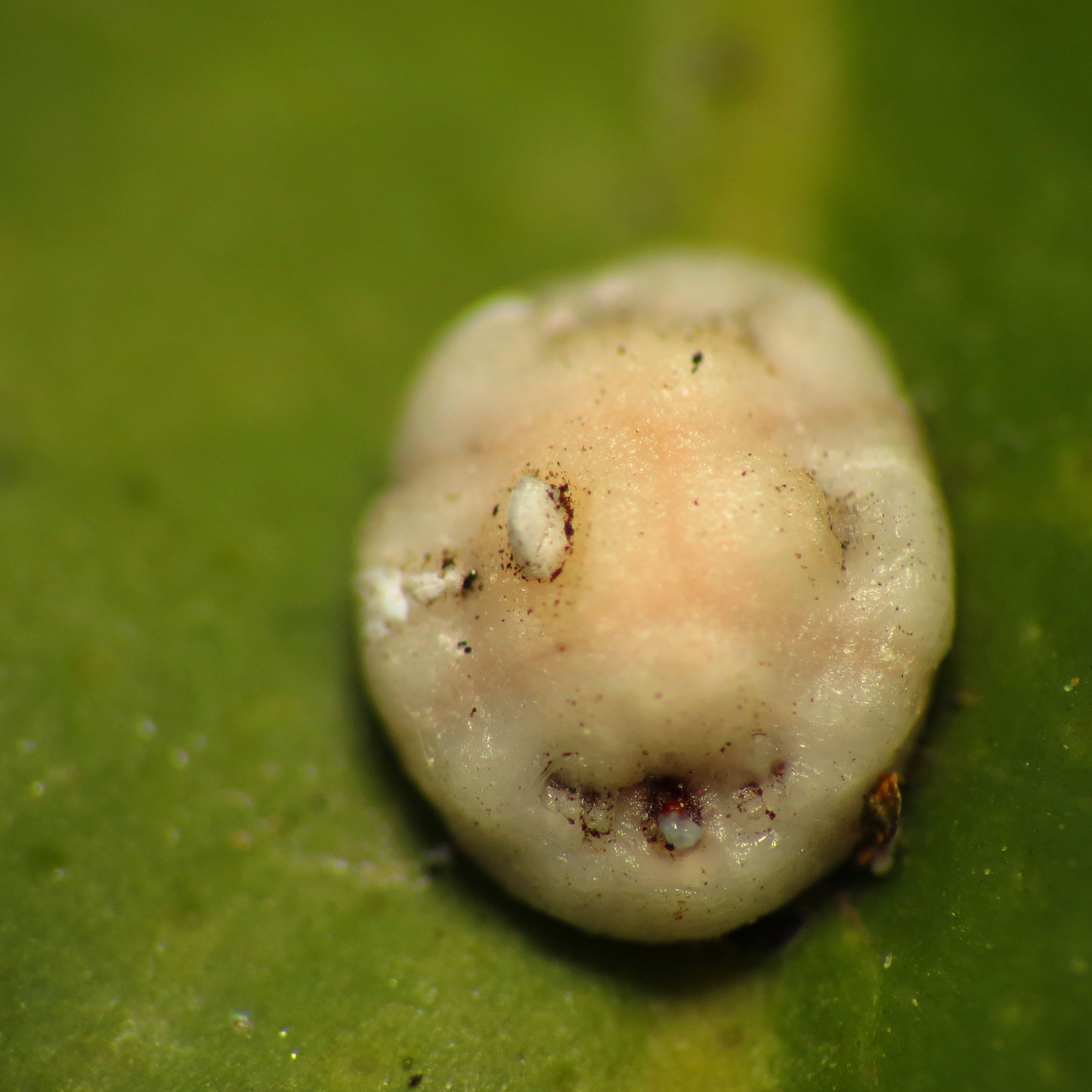

Scientific classification
- Kingdom: Animalia
- Phylum: Arthropoda
- Clade: Pancrustacea
- Class: Insecta
- Order: Hemiptera
- Suborder: Sternorrhyncha
- Family: Coccidae
- Genus: Ceroplastes; Gray, 1828

Diversity
- At least 130 species

= Ceroplastes =

Genus of scale insects

Ceroplastes is a genus of wax scales in the family Coccidae. There are more than 130 described species in Ceroplastes.

== Description ==
Ceroplastes spp. are hemispherical in shape and covered in a thick layer of wax, from which they derive the common name "wax scales". The consistency and thickness of this wax varies among species. Adult females have waxy ridges and white- or dark-coloured speckles or indentations. They range from 1/12 to 1/3 inch long.

Eggs are a pale purple colour, oval in shape and laid under the mother's waxy covering. Eggs hatch into first-instar nymphs, also known as crawlers for their functional legs. These find a location on the host plant to settle, insert their mouthparts and moult into the second instar.

In female individuals, the second and third instars secrete wax to form a covering, and they hardly move from that spot afterwards. Third-instar nymphs moult again into adult females.

In males, the third-instar nymph instead moults into a prepupal instar, then a pupal instar, and finally into the adult. Males are only found in some species of Ceroplastes, with others lacking males.

== Pest status ==
Nymphs and adult females feed on the phloem of their host plants. In severe infestations, they can cause leaf discolouration, leaf drop, branch dieback and even plant death. Infested plants may appear black due to sooty mold, which grows on honeydew secreted by wax scales.

Several species of Ceroplastes are pests that have been introduced widely, including C. ceriferus, C. floridensis, C. japonicus and C. rubens. These feed on a range of plants including apple, citrus, holly (Ilex spp.), kiwifruit (Actinidia spp.), lychee, peach, pear, persimmon, plum, quince and tea.

== See also ==
- List of Ceroplastes species
