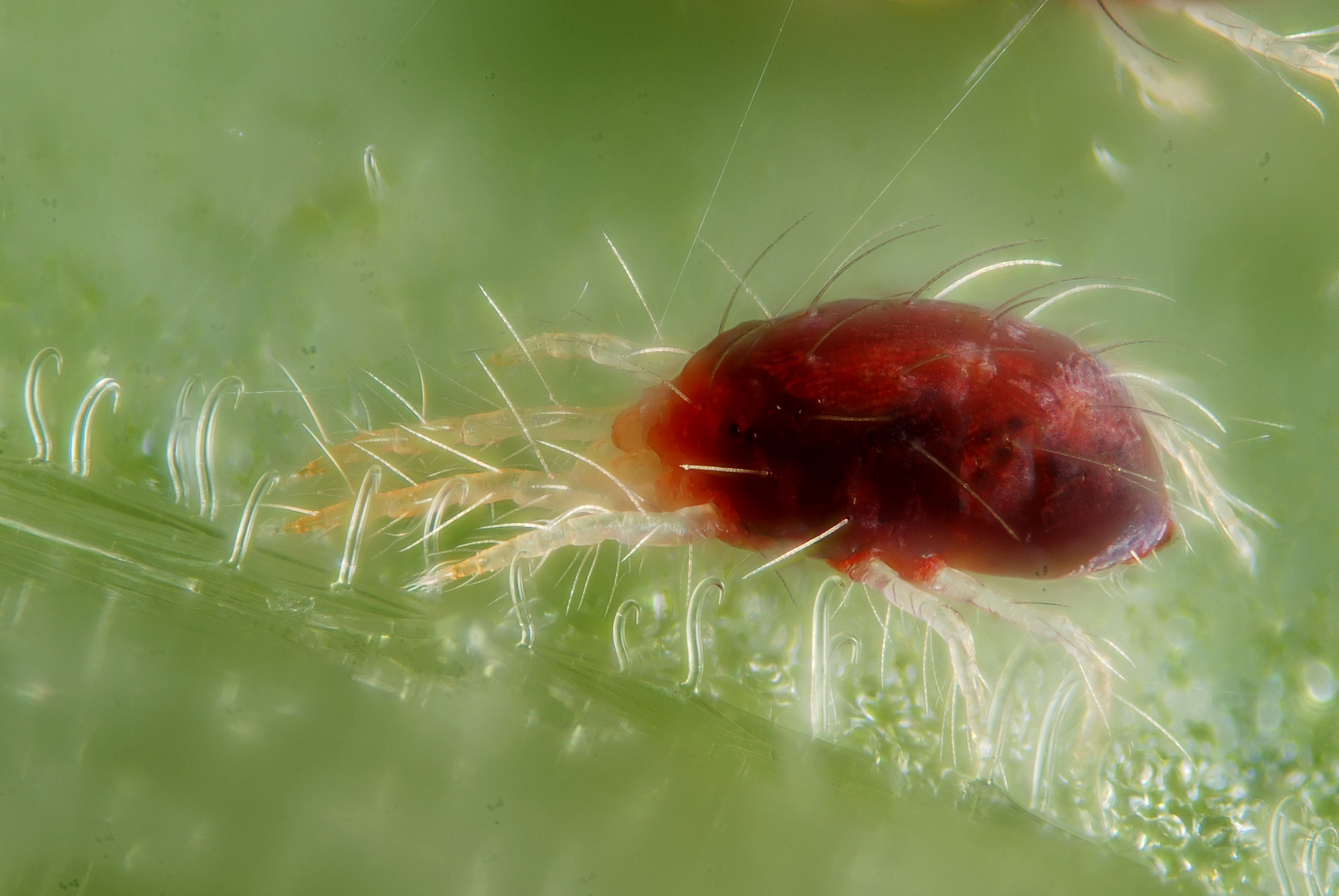
- Tetranychus urticae

Scientific classification
- Kingdom: Animalia
- Phylum: Arthropoda
- Subphylum: Chelicerata
- Class: Arachnida
- Order: Trombidiformes
- Superfamily: Tetranychoidea
- Family: Tetranychidae; Donnadieu, 1875

Subfamilies & tribes
- Bryobinae Berlese: Bryobini Reck; Hystrichonychini Pritchard & Baker; Petrobiini Reck; Tetranychinae Berlese: Tenuipalpoidini Pritchard & Baker; Tetranychini Reck

= Spider mite =

Spider mites Temporal range: Palaeogene–present

Family of arthropods

Spider mites are members of the family Tetranychidae, which includes about 1,200 species. They are part of the subclass Acari (mites). Spider mites generally live on the undersides of leaves of plants, where they may spin protective silk webs, and can cause damage by puncturing the plant cells to feed. Spider mites are known to feed on several hundred species of plants.

== Description ==
Spider mites are less than 1 mm (0.04 in) in size and vary in color. They lay small, spherical, initially transparent eggs and many species spin silk webbing to help protect the colony from predators; they get the "spider" part of their common name from this webbing.

== Life cycle ==
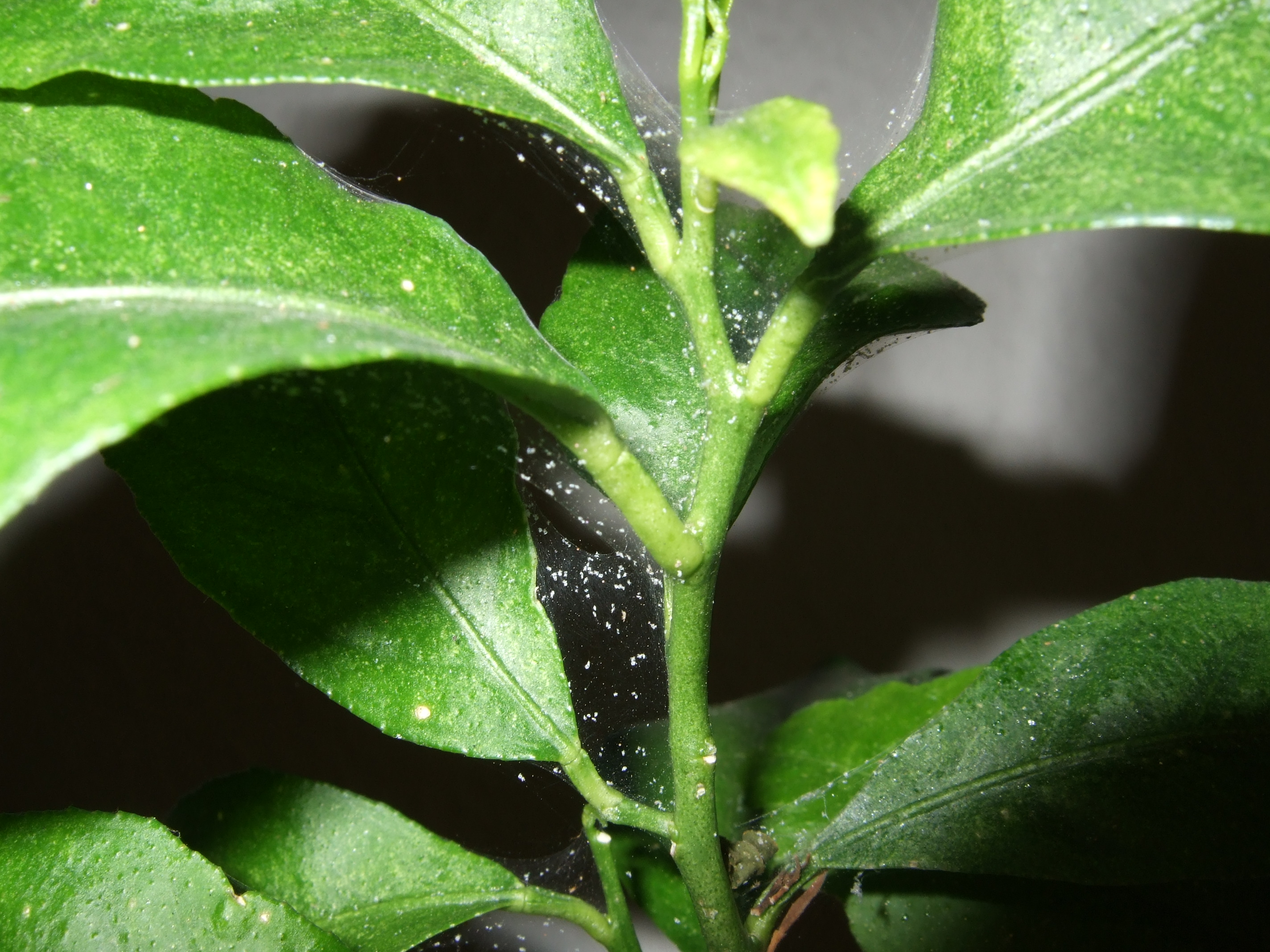
Spider mites on a lemon plant

Hot, dry conditions are often associated with population build-up of spider mites. Under optimal conditions (approximately 27 °C), the two-spotted spider mite can hatch in as little as 3 days, and become sexually mature in as little as 5 days. One female can lay up to 20 eggs per day and can live for 2 to 4 weeks, laying hundreds of eggs. This accelerated reproductive rate allows spider mite populations to adapt quickly to resist pesticides, so chemical control methods can become somewhat ineffectual when the same pesticide is used over a prolonged period.

Spider mites, like hymenopterans and some scale insects, are haplodiploid and therefore arrhenotochous: females are diploid and males are haploid. When mated, females avoid the fecundation of some eggs to produce males. Fertilized eggs produce diploid females. Unmated, unfertilized females still lay eggs that originate exclusively haploid males.

To spread to new locations, they make use of ballooning for aerial dispersal.

Video of multiple spider mites walking on a leaf

== Genera ==
The best known member of the group is Tetranychus urticae, which has a cosmopolitan distribution, and attacks a wide range of plants, including peppers, tomatoes, potatoes, beans, corn, cannabis, and strawberries. Other species which can be important pests of commercial plants include Panonychus ulmi (fruit tree red spider mite) and Panonychus citri (citrus red mite).

The family is divided into these subfamilies, tribes and genera:

Bryobinae Berlese

- Bryobini Reck

- Neoschizonobiella Tseng
- Sinobryobia Ma et al.
- Marainobia Meyer
- Bryobia Koch
- Toronobia Meyer
- Pseudobryobia McGregor
- Strunkobia Livshitz & Mitrofanov
- Mezranobia Athias-Henriot
- Eremobryobia Strunkova & Mitrofanov
- Bryobiella Tuttle & Baker
- Hemibryobia Tuttle & Baker

- Hystrichonychini Pritchard & Baker

- Bryocopsis Meyer
- Tetranychopsis Canestrini
- Notonychus Davis
- Dolichonobia Meyer
- Monoceronychus McGregor
- Mesobryobia Wainstein
- Hystrichonychus McGregor
- Parapetrobia Meyer & Rykev
- Peltanobia Meyer
- Tauriobia Livshitz & Mitrofanov
- Aplonobia Womersley
- Paraplonobia Wainstein
- Beerella Wainstein
- Magdalena Baker & Tuttle
- Porcupinychus Anwarullah
- Afronobia Meyer

- Petrobiini Reck

- Neotrichobia Tuttle & Baker
- Schizonobiella Beer & Lang
- Schizonobia Womersley
- Dasyobia Strunkova
- Lindquistiella Mitrofanov
- Edella Meyer
- Petrobia Murray

Tetranychinae Berlese

- Eurytetranychini Reck

- Atetranychus Tuttle et al.
- Synonychus Miller
- Eurytetranychus Oudemans
- Eurytetranychoides Reck
- Eutetranychus Banks
- Meyernychus Mitrofanov
- Aponychus Rimando
- Paraponychus Gonzalez & Flechtmann
- Sinotetranychus Ma & Yuan
- Anatetranychus Womersley
- Duplanychus Meyer

- Tenuipalpoidini Pritchard & Baker

- Eonychus Gutierrez
- Crotonella Tuttle et al.
- Tenuipalpoides Reck & Bagdasarian
- Tenuipalponychus Channabasavanna & Lakkundi

- Tetranychini Reck

- Brevinychus Meyer
- Sonotetranychus Tuttle et al.
- Mixonychus Meyer & Ryke
- Evertella Meyer
- Panonychus Yokoyama
- Allonychus Pritchard & Baker
- Schizotetranychus Trägårdh
- Yunonychus Ma & Gao
- Yezonychus Ehara
- Neotetranychus Trägårdh
- Acanthonychus Wang
- Mononychellus Wainstein
- Platytetranychus Oudemans
- Eotetranychus Oudemans
- Palmanychus Baker & Tuttle
- Atrichoproctus Flechtmann
- Xinella Ma & Wang
- Oligonychus Berlese
- Hellenychus Gutierrez
- Tetranychus Dufour
- Amphitetranychus Oudemans

== Countermeasures ==
=== Predatory mites ===
Predatory mites of the family Phytoseiidae, including Phytoseiulus persimilis, eat adult mites, their eggs, and all developmental stages between. Predatory mites can consume as many as 5 adult spider mites per day, or 20 eggs per day.

=== Harpin Alpha Beta ===
In some cases, the application of Harpin Alpha Beta protein may help in the treatment and prevention of infestation by stimulating the plant's natural defenses, restoring sap sugar levels and encouraging replacement of damaged tissues. This affects the spider mites' ability to down-regulate the immune response of a plant.

=== Acaricides ===
Acaricides are applied to crops to control spider mites. They can be either systemic or non-systemic in nature and can be persistent by providing residual activity for over a month. Drawbacks include high potential for development of resurgence and resistance in mite populations, as has been observed in previous generations of miticides, and toxicity of some miticides towards fish. Thus proper selection, precautions and application are required to minimize risks.

=== Environmental conditions ===
Temporarily modifying environmental conditions has proven an effective method for insect pest control including spider mites. Generally dramatically decreased oxygen and increased carbon dioxide concentrations at elevated temperatures can lead to mortality at all developmental stages. However mild CO_{2} enrichment has been shown to in fact increase mite reproduction. One study determined a concentration of 0.4% O_{2} and 20% CO_{2} gave a LT_{99} (time to 99% mortality) of 113h at 20 °C and 15.5h at 40 °C. Another study reported 100% mortality of various stages of the two spotted spidermite using 60% CO_{2} and 20% O_{2} at 30 °C for 16h. Advantages would include decreased ability for resistance development compared to miticides and potential ease of application while drawbacks might include sensitivity of the plant to the conditions, feasibility of application, and human safety.

== See also ==
- Pests and diseases of roses
