= List of arachnids of Utah =

This is a list of arachnids observed in the U.S. state of Utah. There are more than 600 species of arachnid in Utah.

== Mites ==
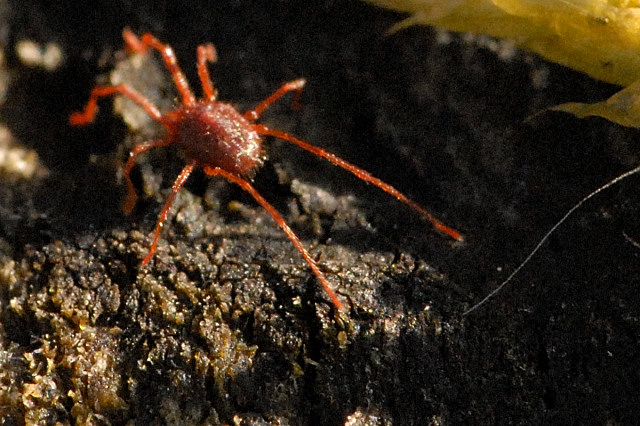
Clover mite

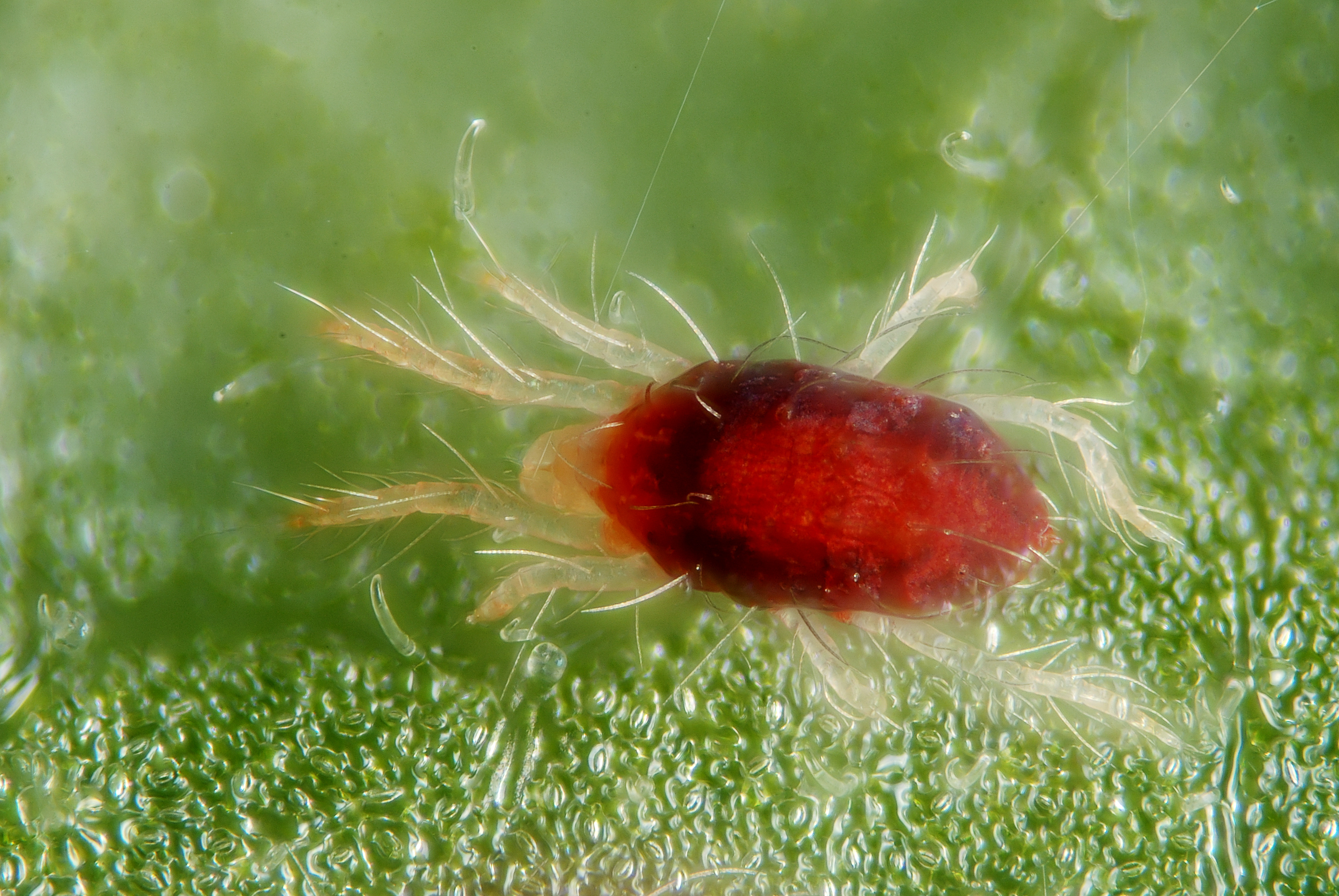
Red spider mite

- Bindweed gall mite (Aceria malherbae)
- Clover mite (Bryobia praetiosa)
- Pearleaf blister mite (Eriophyes pyri)
- Poplar budgall mite (Eriophyes parapopuli)
- Pseudoscorpion (various)
- Red spider mite (Tetranychus urticae) - also called "two-spotted spider mite"
- Red velvet mite (thousands of species)
- Spruce spider mite (Oligonychus ununguis)
- Tomato russet mite (Aculops lycopersici)
- Western predatory mite (Galendromus occidentalis)

== Scorpions ==
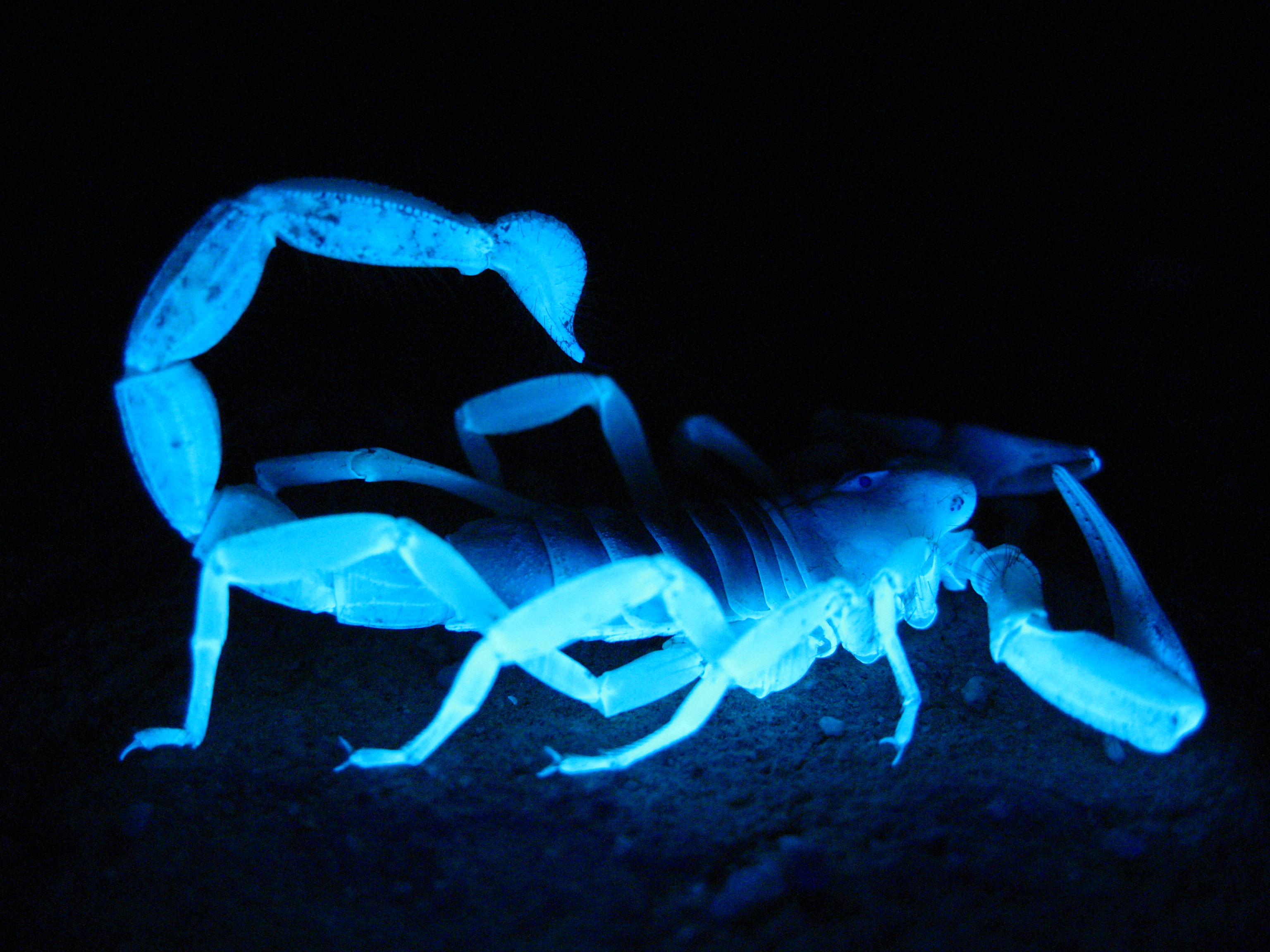
Giant hairy scorpion under UV light

- Arizona bark scorpion (Centruroides exilicauda)
- Beck desert scorpion (Paruroctonus becki)
- Black hairy scorpion (Hadrurus spadix)
- Eastern sand scorpion (Paruroctonus utahensis)
- Giant desert hairy scorpion (Hadrurus arizonensis)
- Northern scorpion (Paruroctonus boreus)
- Sawfinger scorpion (Serradigitus wupatkiensis)
- Wood scorpion (Anuroctonus phaiodactylus)
- Yellow ground scorpion (Vaejovis confusus)

== Spiders ==
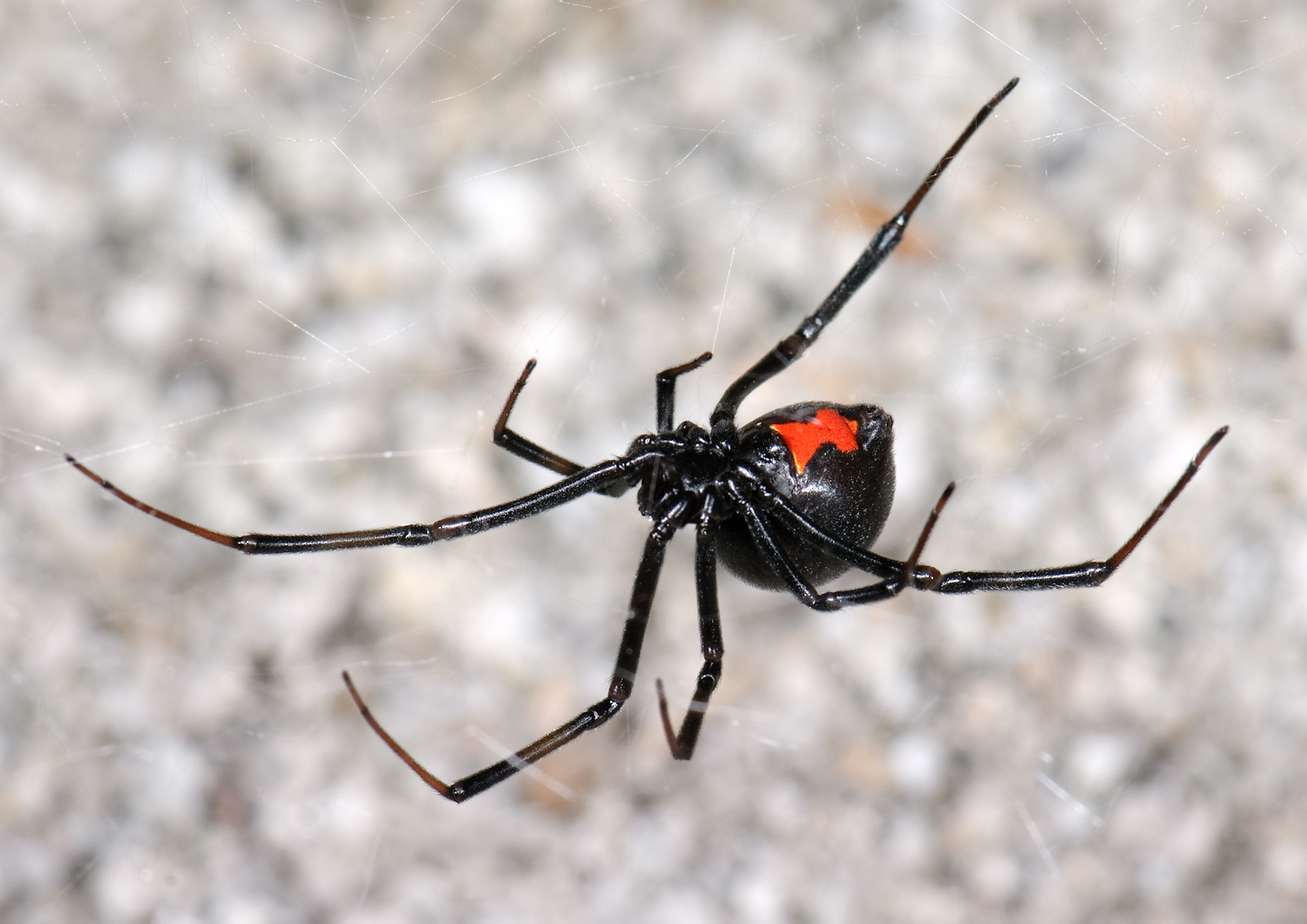
Western black widow spider

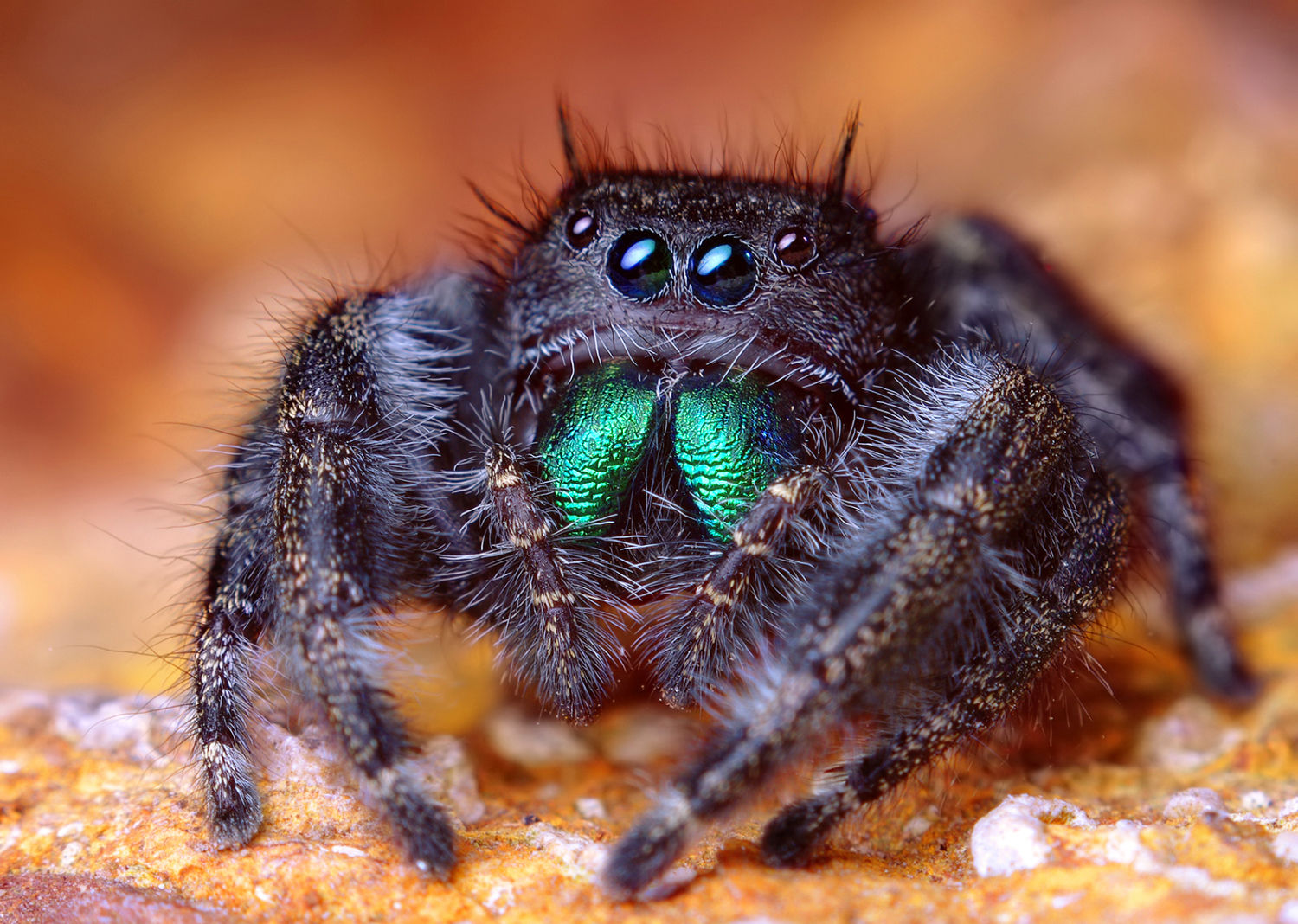
Bold jumping spider

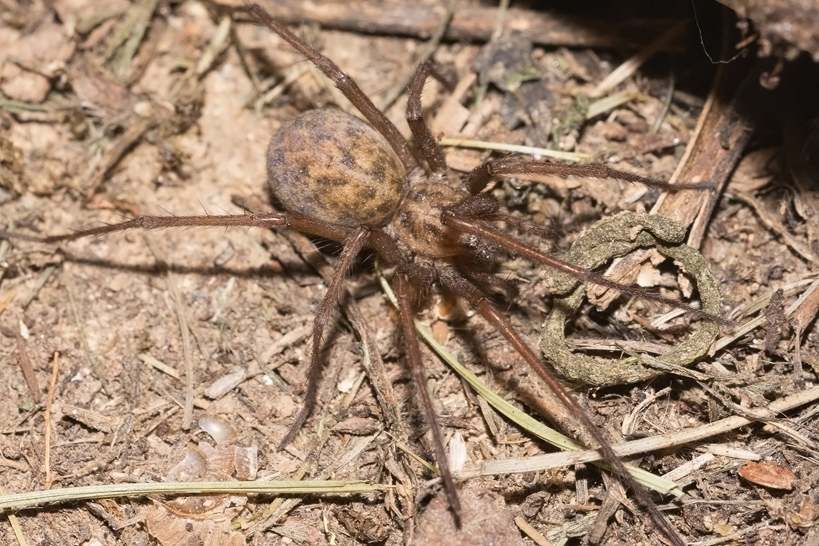
Hobo spider

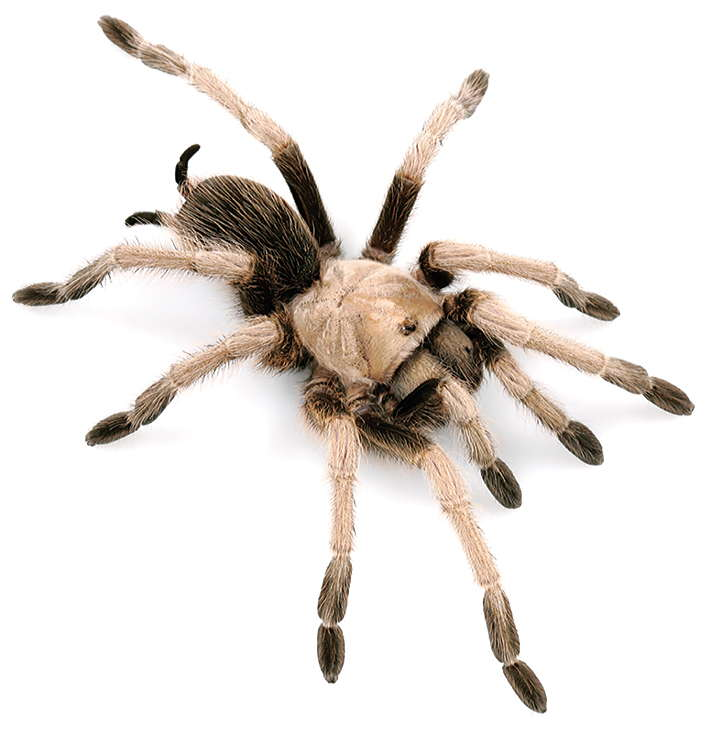
Salt Lake County brown tarantula

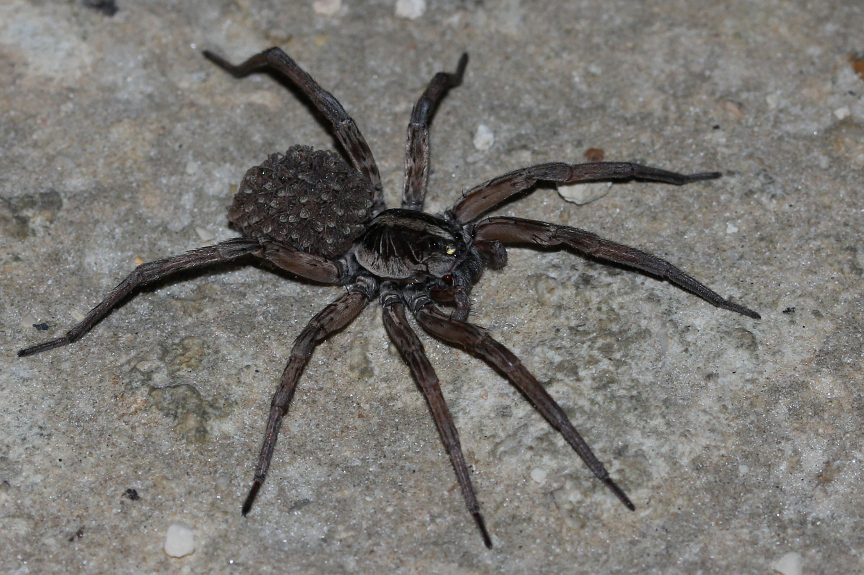
Wolf spider with spiderlings

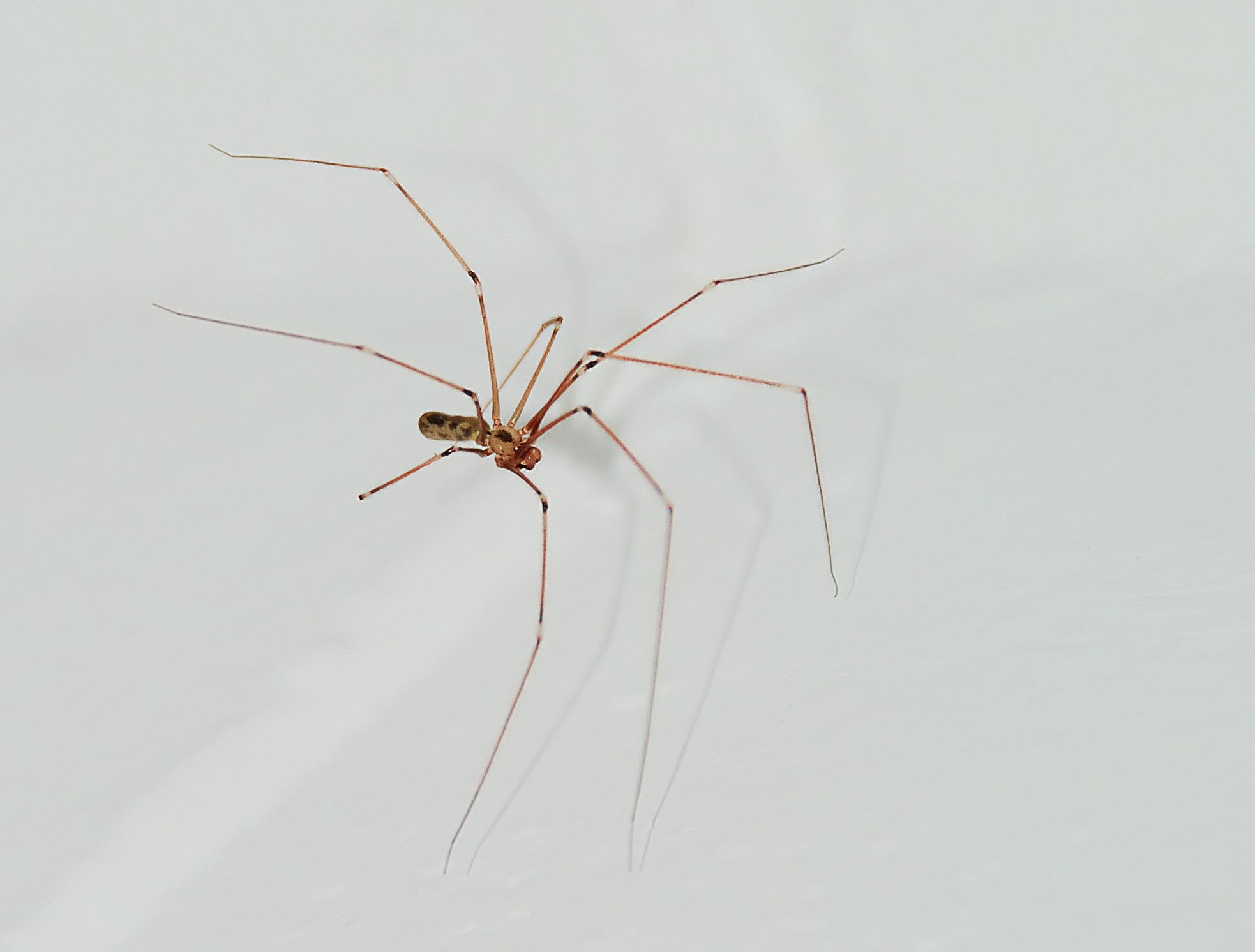
Cellar spider (daddy long-legs)

- American grass spider (Agelenopsis spp.)
- American yellow sac spider (Cheiracanthium inclusum)
- Ant spider (Micaria pasadena)
- Ant spider (Micaria rossica)
- Antmimic spider (Meriola decepta )
- Banded orb weaving spider (Argiope trifasciata)
- Bold jumping spider (Phidippus audax)
- Bull-headed sac spider (Trachelas mexicanus)
- Camel spider (Ammotrechula spp.)
- Camel spider (Eremobates spp.)
- Carolina wolf spider (Hogna carolinensis)
- Cat-faced spider (Araneus gemmoides)
- Cellar spiders (Pholcus phalangioides) - also called "daddy long-legs"
- Crab spider (Bassaniana utahensis)
- Crab spider (Ebo merkeli)
- Crab spider (Ebo pepinensis)
- Crab spider (Mecaphesa spp.)
- Crab spider (Xysticus discursans)
- Crab spider (Xysticus emertoni)
- Crab spider (Xysticus facetus)
- Crab spider (Xysticus paiutus)
- Crab spider (Xysticus pellax )
- Eastern parson spider (Herpyllus ecclesiasticus)
- False black widow (Steatoda grossa)
- Flat-bellied ground spider (Callilepis mumai)
- Flattened crab spider (Philodromus histrio)
- Flattened crab spider (Philodromus imbecillus)
- Flattened crab spider (Philodromus satullus)
- Flattened crab spider (Philodromus spectabilis)
- Ground spider (Cesonia gertschi)
- Ground spider (Drassodes spp.)
- Ground spider (Drassyllus inanus)
- Ground spider (Drassyllus lepidus)
- Ground spider (Drassyllus mexicanus)
- Ground spider (Drassyllus nannellus)
- Ground spider (Gnaphosa californica)
- Ground spider (Gnaphosa clara)
- Ground spider (Gnaphosa dentata)
- Ground spider (Gnaphosa salsa)
- Ground spider (Gnaphosa saxosa)
- Ground spider (Gnaphosa sericata)
- Ground spider (Gnaphosa synthetica)
- Ground spider (Herpyllus cockerelli)
- Ground spider (Herpyllus convallis)
- Ground spider (Micaria nanella)
- Ground spider (Sergiolus lowelli)
- Hobo spider (Tegenaria agrestis)
- Huntsman spider (Olios fasciculatus)
- Huntsman spider (Olios giganteus)
- Jumping spider (Habronattus conjunctus)
- Jumping spider (Habronattus signatus)
- Jumping spider (Habronattus tarsalis)
- Jumping spider (Pelegrina verecunda)
- Jumping spider (Platycryptus arizonensis)
- Jumping spider (Salticus peckhamae)
- Jumping spider (Terralonus unicus)
- Mormon ant spider (Micaria mormon)
- Mormon ground spider (Drassyllus mormon)
- Running crab spider (Titanebo dondalei)
- Running crab spider (Titanebo magnificus)
- Sac spider (Castianeira nanella)
- Sac spider (Drassinella unicolor)
- Sac spider (Phrurotimpus borealis)
- Sac spider (Phrurotimpus nr. woodburyi)
- Salt Lake County brown tarantula (Aphonopelma iodius)
- Slender crab spider (Tibellus chamberlini)
- Slender crab spider (Tibellus duttoni)
- Striped lynx spider (Oxyopes scalaris)
- Texas running crab spider (Titanebo texanus)
- Utah crevice weaver (Kukulcania utahana)
- Utah ground spider (Gnaphosa utahana)
- Western black widow spider (Latrodectus hesperus)
- White-banded crab spider (Misumenoides formosipes)
- Wolf spider (Hogna spp.)
- Woodlouse spider (Dysdera crocata)

== Other ==
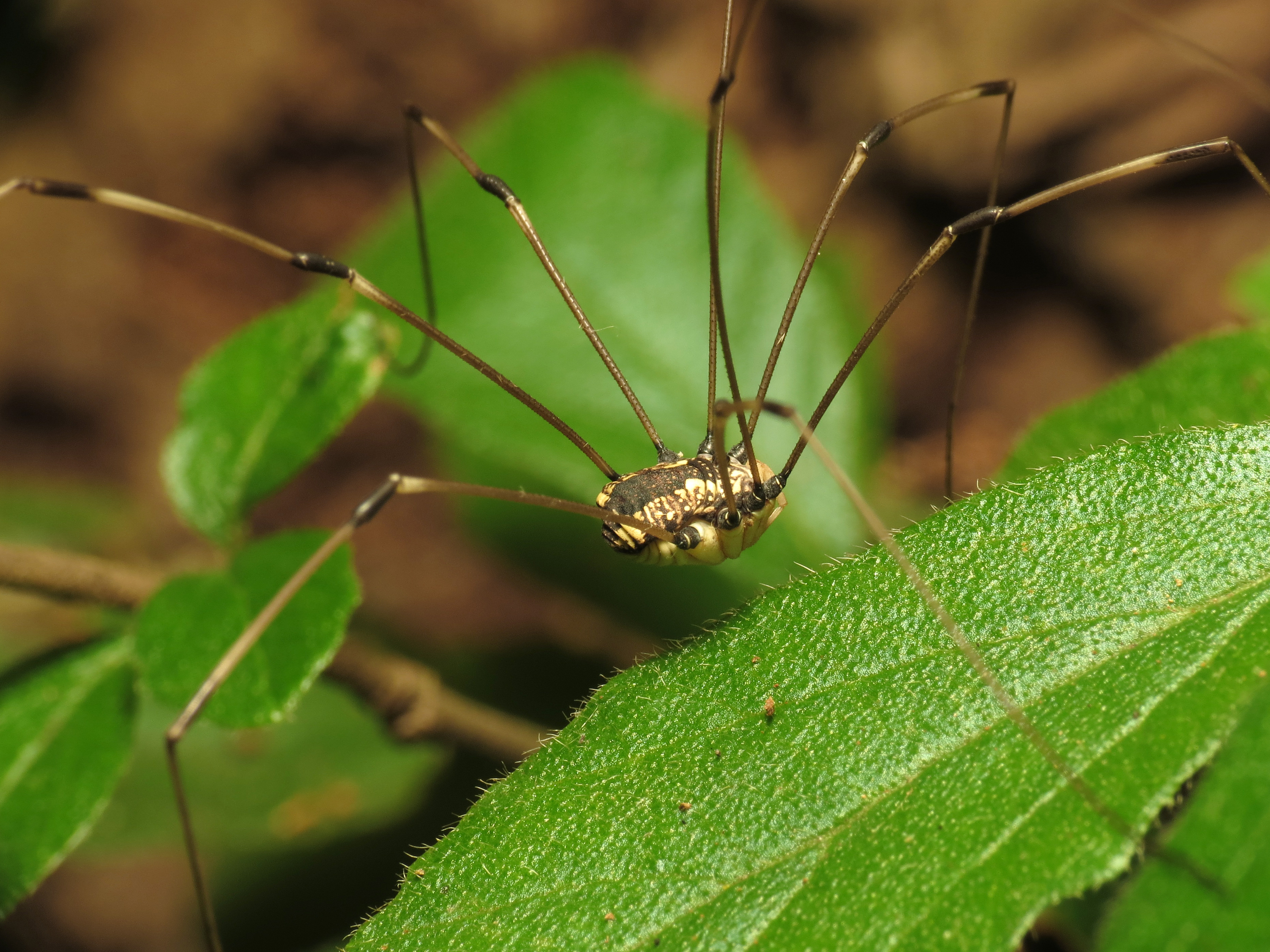
Opiliones, or daddy-long-legs.

- Opiliones (harvestman, "daddy long-legs")
- Rocky Mountain wood tick (Dermacentor andersoni)
- Soft-bodied tick (Ornithodoros spp.)
- Spinose ear tick (Otobius megnini)
