= Parson spider =

Parson spider is the common name for at least two species of ground spiders in the genus Herpyllus:

- Herpyllus ecclesiasticus, the eastern parson spider
- Herpyllus propinquus, the western parson spider
