= Zelotes haplodrassoides =

Niger Dark Ground Spider

Conservation status
- Least Concern (SANBI Red List)

Scientific classification
- Kingdom: Animalia
- Phylum: Arthropoda
- Subphylum: Chelicerata
- Class: Arachnida
- Order: Araneae
- Infraorder: Araneomorphae
- Family: Gnaphosidae
- Genus: Zelotes
- Species: Z. haplodrassoides

Binomial name
- Zelotes haplodrassoides (Denis, 1955)

Synonyms
- Herpyllus haplodrassoides Denis, 1955

Species of spider

Zelotes haplodrassoides is a species of spider in the family Gnaphosidae. It is found in several African countries across the continent and is commonly known as the Niger dark ground spider.

== Distribution ==
Zelotes haplodrassoides occurs in three African countries: Ethiopia, Niger, and South Africa. In South Africa, the species is presently known from a few records across four provinces, Gauteng, Limpopo, Mpumalanga, and Western Cape. It occurs at altitudes ranging from 1,341 to 1,795 m above sea level.

Collection localities include Klipriviersberg Nature Reserve, Lhuvhondo Nature Reserve, Western Soutpansberg, Wakkerstroom, and the Cederberg Wilderness Area.

== Habitat and ecology ==
Zelotes haplodrassoides are free-running spiders found under stones during the day. The species has been sampled from the Fynbos, Grassland, and Savanna biomes.

== Conservation ==
Zelotes haplodrassoides is listed as Least Concern by the South African National Biodiversity Institute due to its wide geographic range. There are no significant threats to the species, and it is protected in the Klipriviersberg Nature Reserve, Lhuvhondo Nature Reserve, and Cederberg Wilderness Area.

== Taxonomy ==
The species was originally described by Denis in 1955 from Niger as Herpyllus haplodrassoides. It was transferred to the genus Zelotes by Levy in 1998. FitzPatrick's 2007 revision provided additional morphological details. The species is known from both sexes.
