= Lipkemera =

Scientific classification
- Domain: Eukaryota
- Kingdom: Animalia
- Phylum: Arthropoda
- Class: Malacostraca
- Order: Decapoda
- Suborder: Pleocyemata
- Infraorder: Brachyura
- Family: Xanthidae
- Subfamily: Liomerinae
- Genus: Lipkemera; Davie, 2010

Genus of crabs

Lipkemera is a genus of crabs in the family Xanthidae. It was originally named Meriola, but this name was preoccupied, having been used for a genus of spiders in 1895. The genus was renamed Lipkemera in 2010. It contains the following species:

- Lipkemera acutidens (Sakai, 1969)
- Lipkemera corallina (Takeda & Marumura, 1997)
- Lipkemera holthuisi Mendoza, 2010
- Lipkemera iejima Naruse & Fujita, 2015
- Lipkemera rufomaculata (Davie, 1993)
