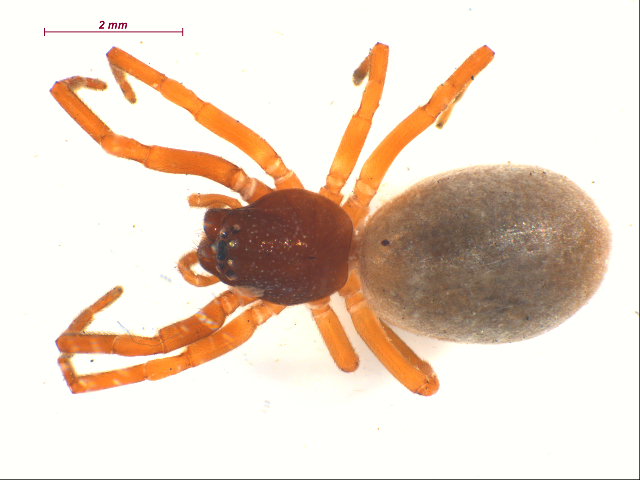

Scientific classification
- Domain: Eukaryota
- Kingdom: Animalia
- Phylum: Arthropoda
- Subphylum: Chelicerata
- Class: Arachnida
- Order: Araneae
- Infraorder: Araneomorphae
- Family: Trachelidae
- Genus: Meriola
- Species: M. californica

Binomial name
- Meriola californica (Banks, 1904)

= Meriola californica =

Species of spider

Meriola californica is a species of true spider in the family Trachelidae. It is found in the United States and Mexico.
