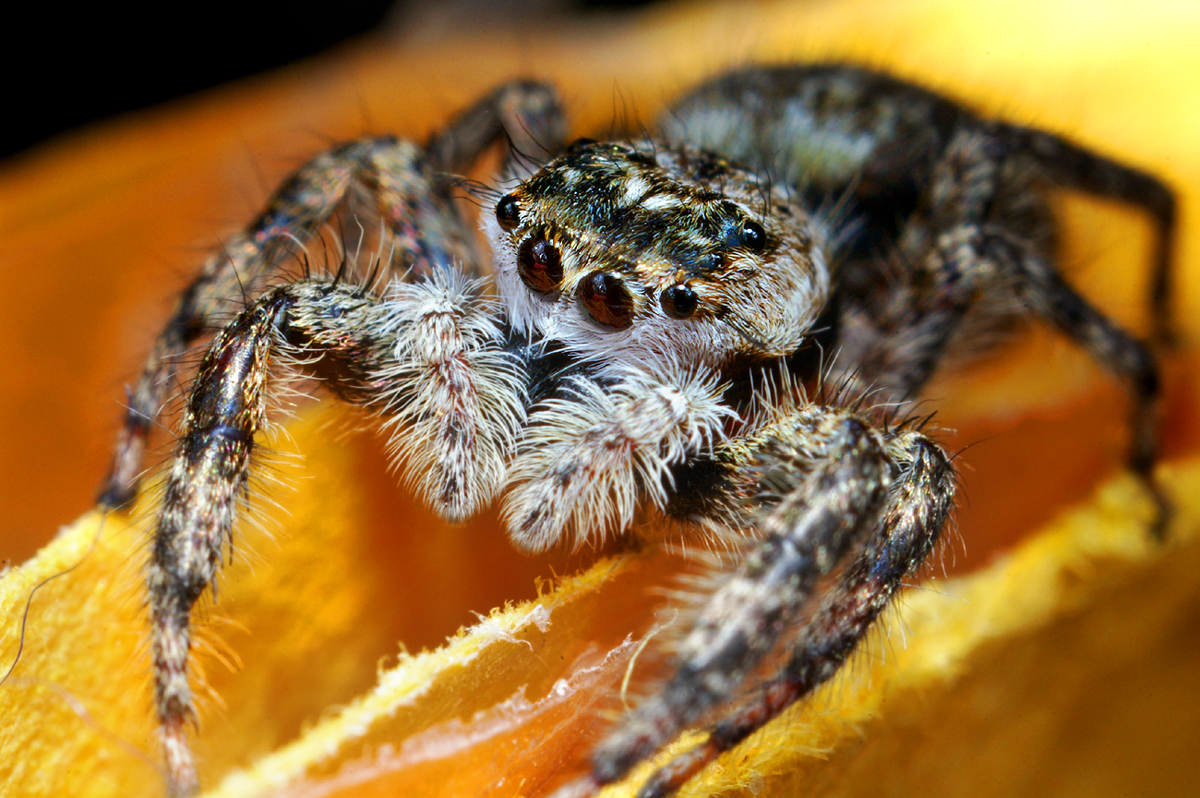
- Platycryptus undatus

Scientific classification
- Kingdom: Animalia
- Phylum: Arthropoda
- Subphylum: Chelicerata
- Class: Arachnida
- Order: Araneae
- Infraorder: Araneomorphae
- Family: Salticidae
- Subfamily: Salticinae
- Genus: Platycryptus; Hill, 1979

Type species
- P. undatus (De Geer, 1778)

Species
- 4, see text

= Platycryptus =

Genus of spiders

Platycryptus is a genus of jumping spiders that was first described by D. E. Hill in 1979. The name comes from the Greek platy meaning flat and crypt meaning hidden, as these spiders are squat and will frequently hide in crevices. They have hairy bodies with a cryptic gray and brown color pattern. They live on or under the bark of trees, and can be found on man-made wooden structures.

== Species ==
As of August 2019 it contains four species, found only in North America, Central America, and Brazil:

- Platycryptus arizonensis (Barnes, 1958) – USA
- Platycryptus californicus (Peckham & Peckham, 1888) – North, Central America
- Platycryptus magnus (Peckham & Peckham, 1894) – Mexico to Brazil
- Platycryptus undatus (De Geer, 1778) (type) – North America
