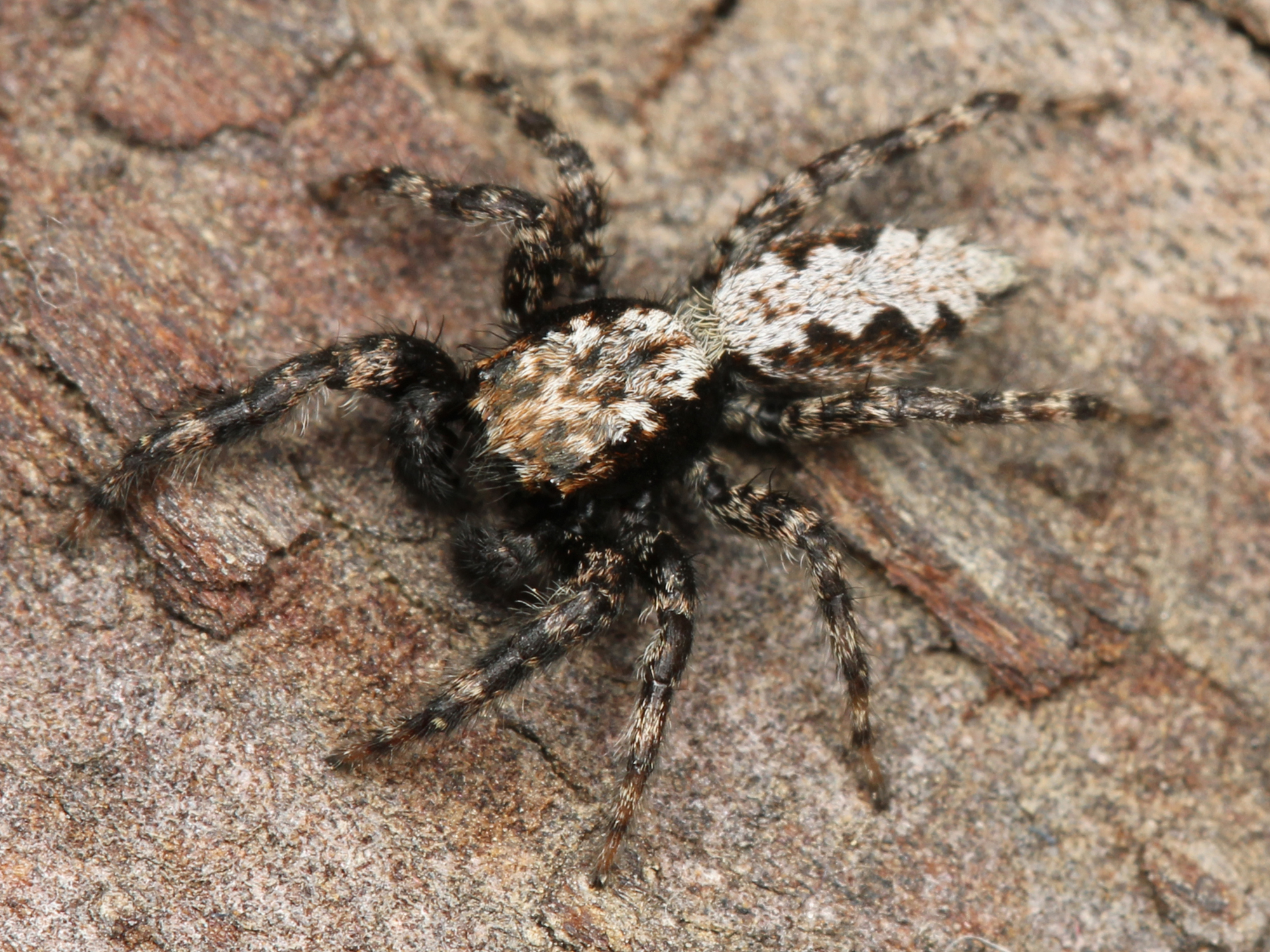

Scientific classification
- Kingdom: Animalia
- Phylum: Arthropoda
- Subphylum: Chelicerata
- Class: Arachnida
- Order: Araneae
- Infraorder: Araneomorphae
- Family: Salticidae
- Genus: Platycryptus
- Species: P. californicus

Binomial name
- Platycryptus californicus (Peckham & Peckham, 1888)

= Platycryptus californicus =

Species of spider

Platycryptus californicus is a species of jumping spider in the family Salticidae. It is found in North and Central America.

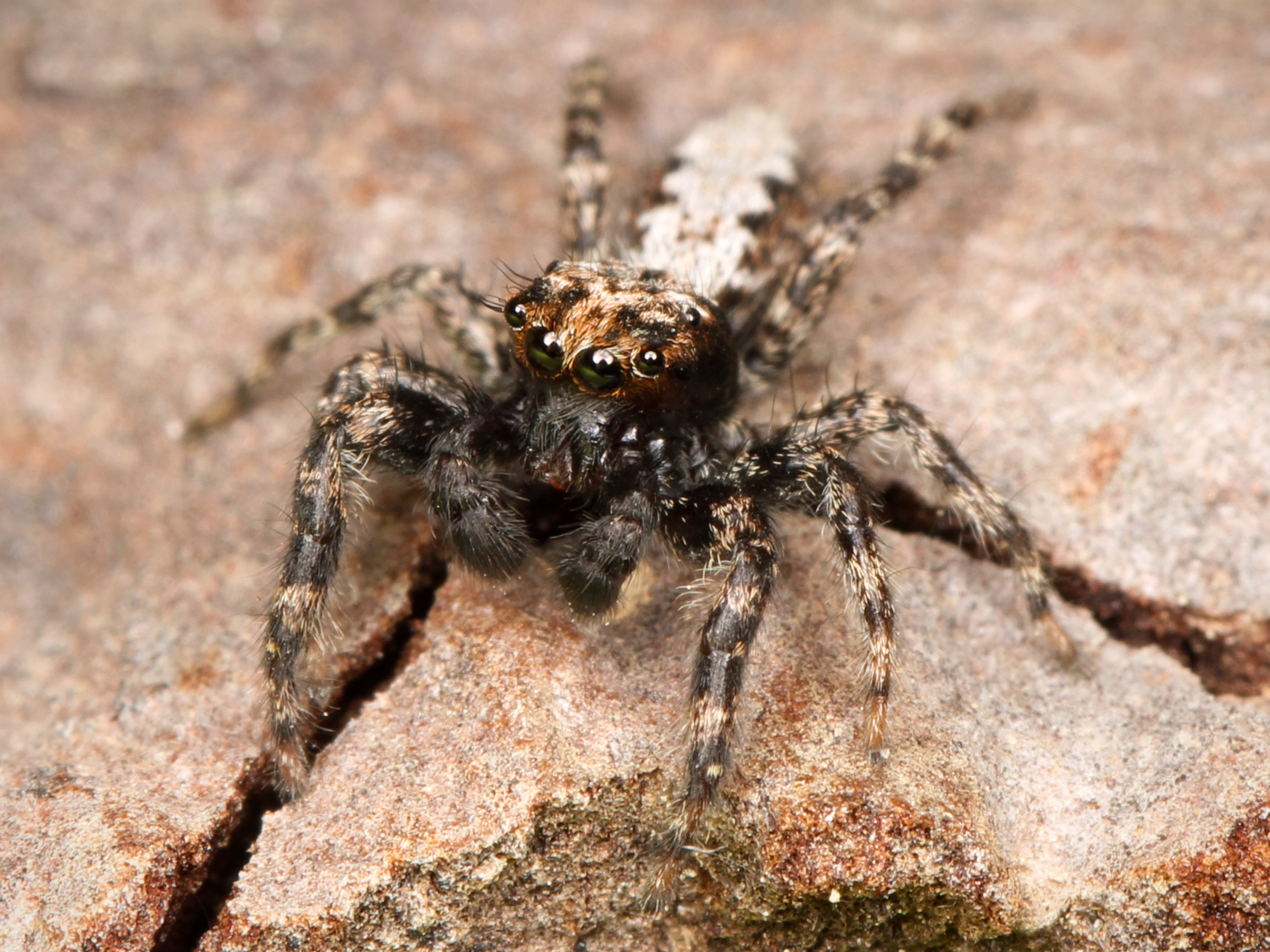
