= Platycryptus magnus =

Scientific classification
- Kingdom: Animalia
- Phylum: Arthropoda
- Subphylum: Chelicerata
- Class: Arachnida
- Order: Araneae
- Infraorder: Araneomorphae
- Family: Salticidae
- Genus: Platycryptus
- Species: P. magnus

Binomial name
- Platycryptus magnus (Peckham & Peckham, 1958)

Species of arachnid

Platycryptus magnus is a species of jumping spider in the family Salticidae. It is found in Central America, has a large hairy body and is mostly gray. They are very similar to other platycryptus, but differ from other members of their genus by having a moderate retrolateral tibial apophysis, a small bump on their pedipalp. Previously, Marpissa broadwayi was mischaracterized as a separate species but they are synonymous.
