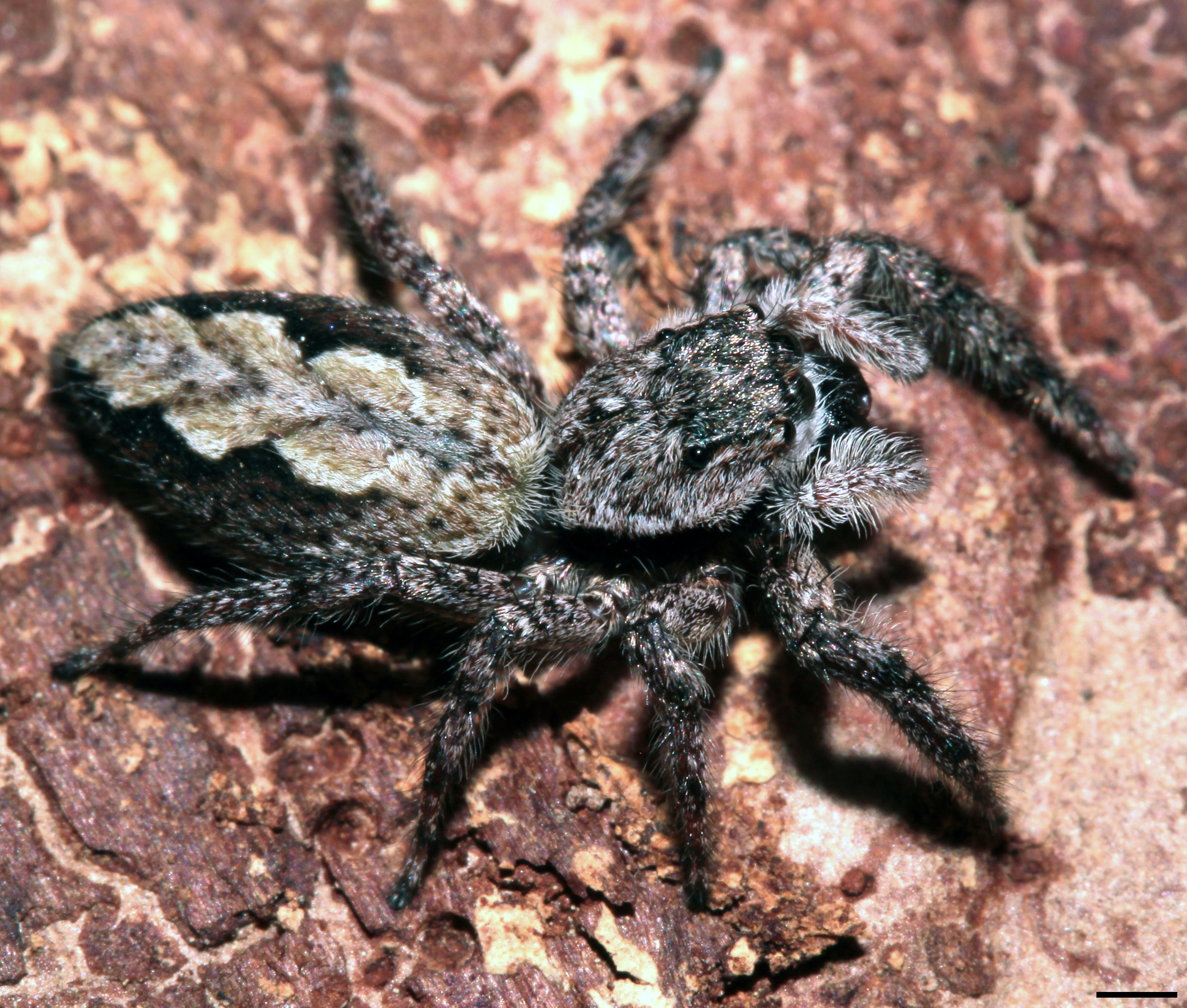
- Female
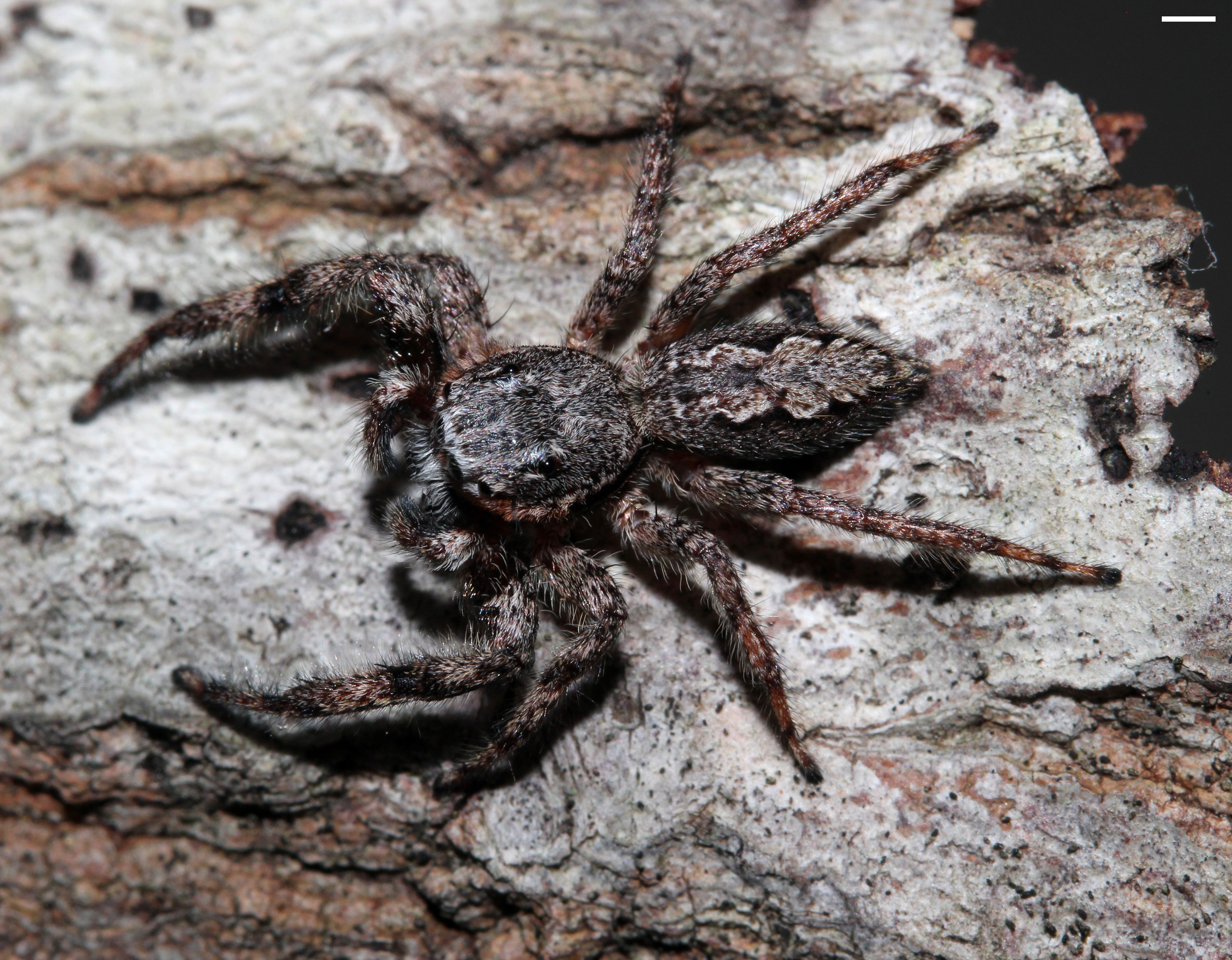
- Male

Scientific classification
- Kingdom: Animalia
- Phylum: Arthropoda
- Subphylum: Chelicerata
- Class: Arachnida
- Order: Araneae
- Infraorder: Araneomorphae
- Family: Salticidae
- Genus: Platycryptus
- Species: P. undatus

Binomial name
- Platycryptus undatus (de Geer, 1778)

Synonyms
- List: Aranea lurida Olivier, 1789; Aranea undata De Geer, 1778; Attus cunctator Walckenaer, 1837; Attus familiaris Hentz, 1846; Attus lentus Walckenaer, 1837; Attus milberti Walckenaer, 1837; Attus rupicola Hentz, 1846; Attus undatus (De Geer, 1778); Dendryphantes conspersa (C. L. Koch, 1846); Dendryphantes undatus (De Geer, 1778); Dendryphantes varia (C. L. Koch, 1846); Marpissa conspersa C. L. Koch, 1846; Marpissa familiaris (Hentz, 1846); Marpissa rupicola (Hentz, 1846); Marpissa undata (De Geer, 1778); Marpissa varia C. L. Koch, 1846; Marptusa familiaris (Hentz, 1846); Marptusa rupicola (Hentz, 1846); Metacyrba undata (De Geer, 1778); Platycryptus undata (De Geer, 1778); Platycryptus undatus (De Geer, 1778); Salticus sundevalli Blackwall, 1846

= Platycryptus undatus =

Species of spider

Platycryptus undatus, also called the tan or familiar jumping spider, is a species of jumping spider (family Salticidae), native to North America.

== Description ==
Tan jumping spiders can be identified by their mottled tan coloration, thin bodies and chevron patterning on their abdomens. The tan jumping spider's thin body allows them to hide themselves under the loosened bark of trees and in other tight places. The prominent chevron-like pattern on their abdomens serves to break up their visual profile and make them more difficult to distinguish on mottled surfaces.

Females of this species are between 10 and 13 mm in body length, and males range from 8.5 to 9.5 mm.

Tan jumping spiders, like many jumping spider species, prefer to hunt on vertical surfaces and can frequently be found on the trunks of trees or on the walls of buildings. These spiders are not inclined to bite, though they can deliver a defensive bite if they are pinched or squeezed.

Eggs are laid and hatch during the summer, and adults and other stages overwinter in their individual silken shelters. Although the shelters are built separately and keep the spiders out of direct contact with each other, Kaston reports that as many as fifty spiders may crowd their shelters for hibernation together, so tightly that they form a continuous blanket under the loose bark of a standing tree.

== Distribution ==
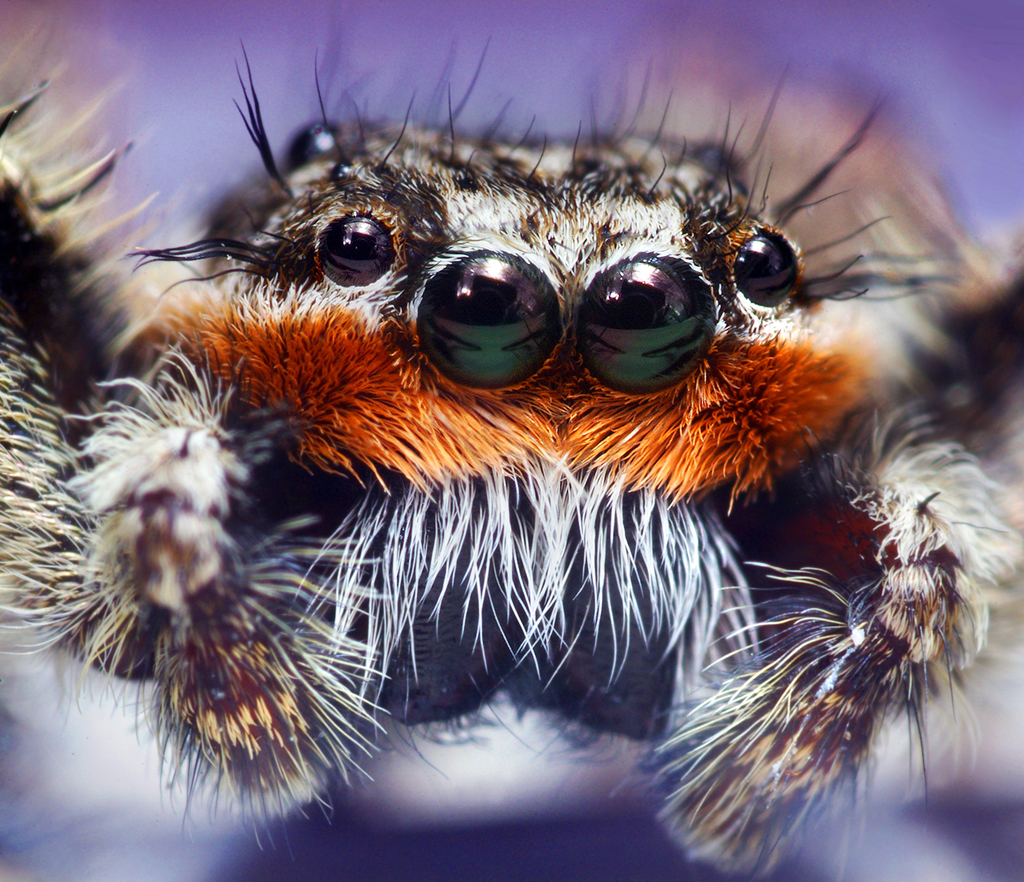
Adult male

Platycryptus undatus can be found in North and Central America. The distribution of this species ranges from the Eastern States and adjacent Canada, to Texas and Wisconsin. This species is also found in northern Mexico.
