= Meriola arcifera =

Scientific classification
- Kingdom: Animalia
- Phylum: Arthropoda
- Subphylum: Chelicerata
- Class: Arachnida
- Order: Araneae
- Infraorder: Araneomorphae
- Family: Trachelidae
- Genus: Meriola
- Species: M. arcifera

Binomial name
- Meriola arcifera (Simon, 1886)

Species of spider

Meriola arcifera is a species of true spider in the family Trachelidae. It is found in Chile, Bolivia, Argentina, has been introduced into the United States (California, and Hawaii).
