= Herpyllus cockerelli =

Scientific classification
- Domain: Eukaryota
- Kingdom: Animalia
- Phylum: Arthropoda
- Subphylum: Chelicerata
- Class: Arachnida
- Order: Araneae
- Infraorder: Araneomorphae
- Family: Gnaphosidae
- Genus: Herpyllus
- Species: H. cockerelli

Binomial name
- Herpyllus cockerelli (Banks, 1901)

Species of spider

Herpyllus cockerelli is a species of ground spider in the family Gnaphosidae. It is found in the United States and Mexico.
