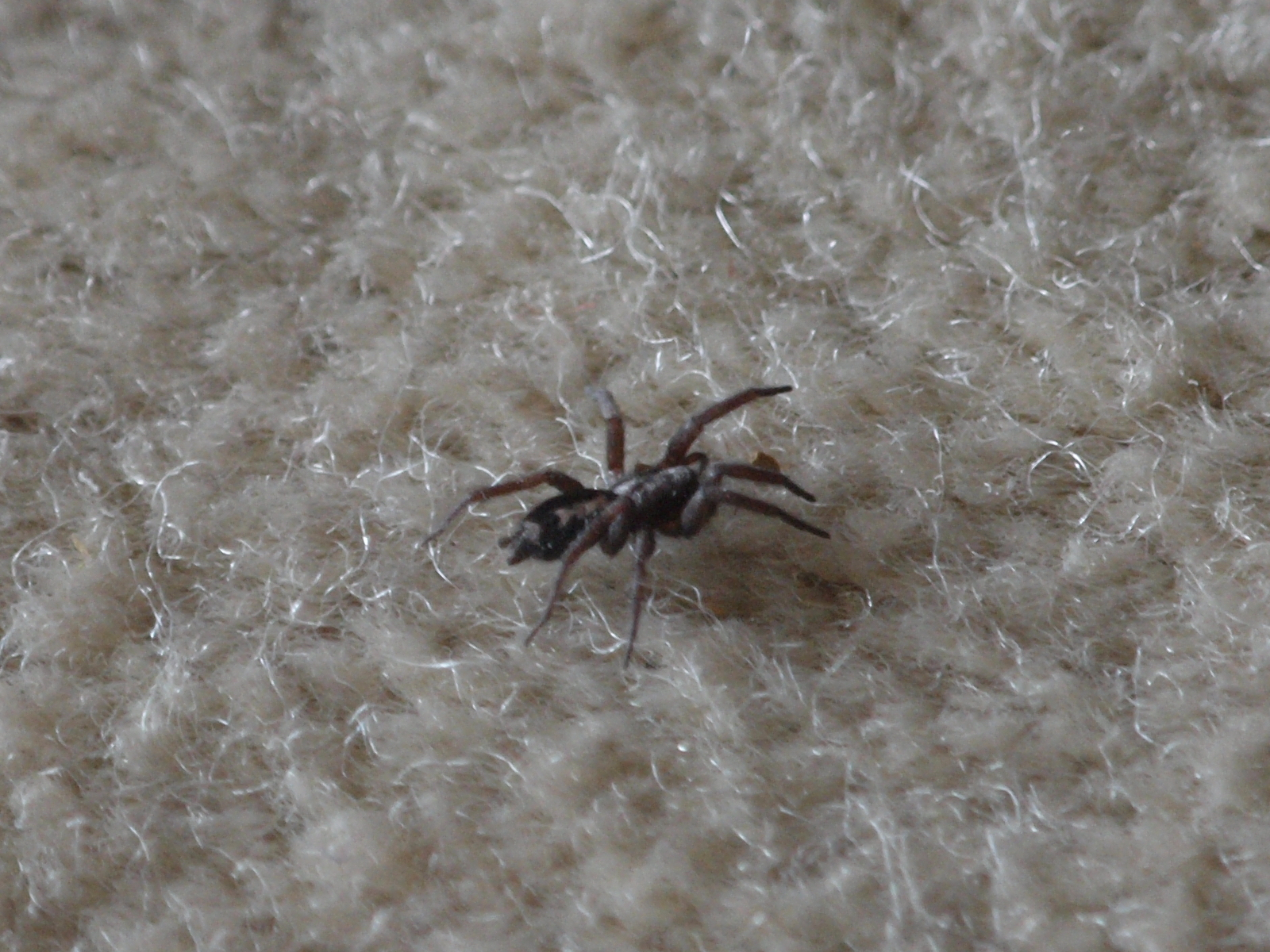

Scientific classification
- Domain: Eukaryota
- Kingdom: Animalia
- Phylum: Arthropoda
- Subphylum: Chelicerata
- Class: Arachnida
- Order: Araneae
- Infraorder: Araneomorphae
- Family: Gnaphosidae
- Genus: Herpyllus
- Species: H. propinquus

Binomial name
- Herpyllus propinquus (Keyserling, 1887)

Synonyms
- Herpyllus californicus Banks, 1904; Prosthesima propinqua Keyserling, 1887

= Herpyllus propinquus =

Species of spider

Herpyllus propinquus, the western parson spider, is a species of ground spider in the family Gnaphosidae that occurs in North America.

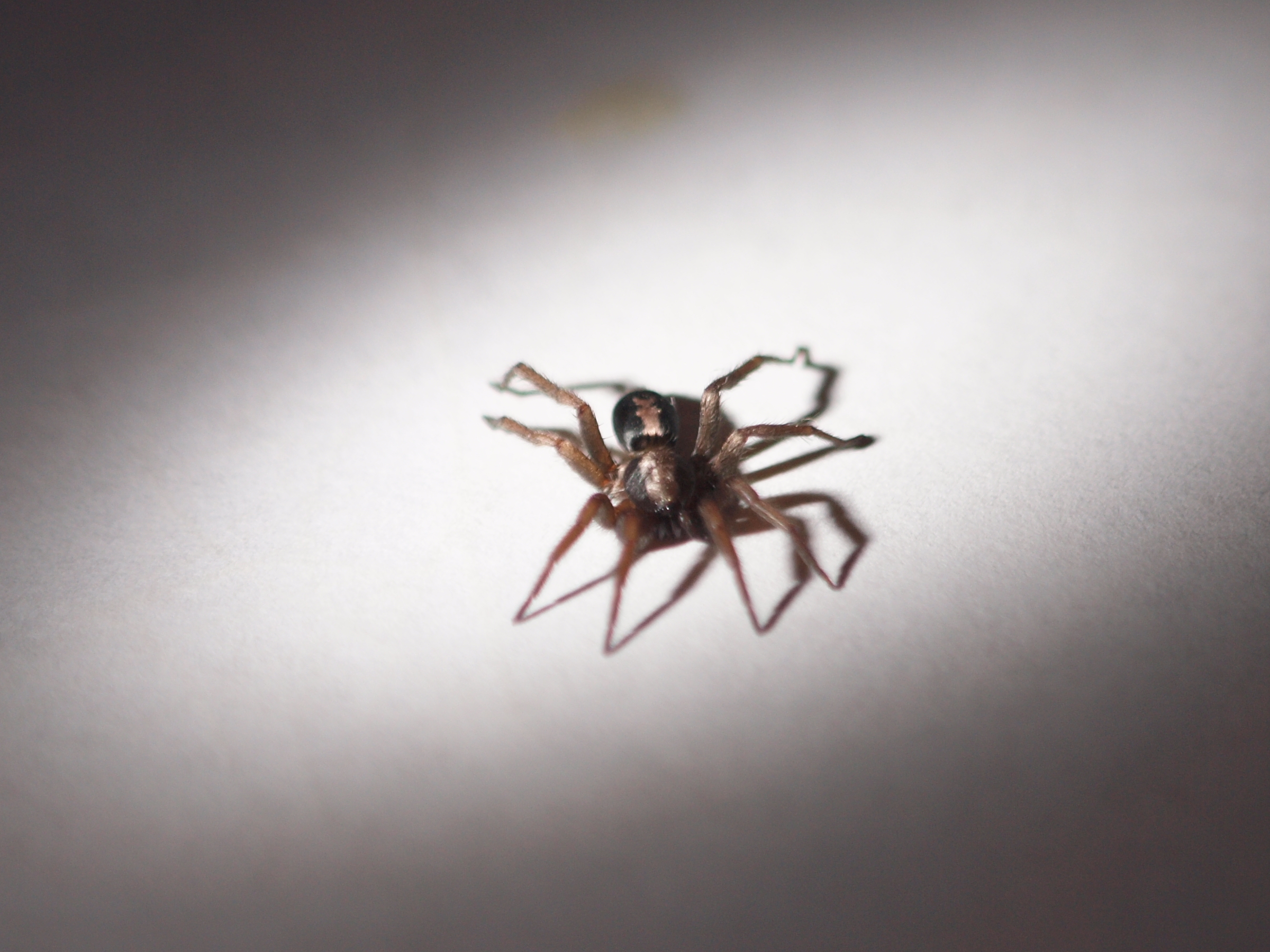
Western parson spider, Herpyllus propinquus
