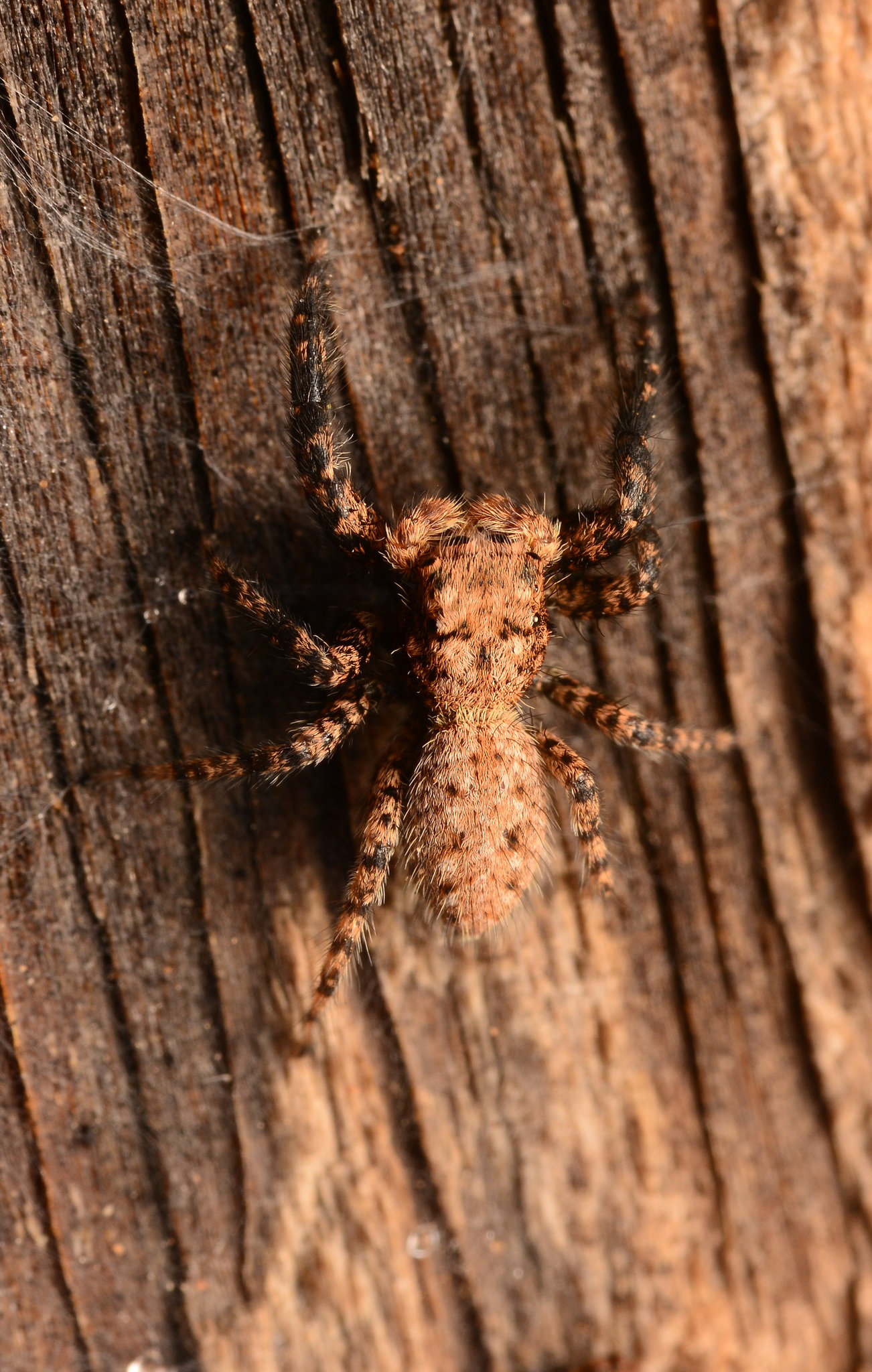
- Adult male dorsal

Scientific classification
- Kingdom: Animalia
- Phylum: Arthropoda
- Subphylum: Chelicerata
- Class: Arachnida
- Order: Araneae
- Infraorder: Araneomorphae
- Family: Salticidae
- Genus: Platycryptus
- Species: P. arizonensis

Binomial name
- Platycryptus arizonensis (Barnes, 1958)

= Platycryptus arizonensis =

Species of arachnid

Platycryptus arizonensis is a species of jumping spider in the family Salticidae. It is found in the United States.

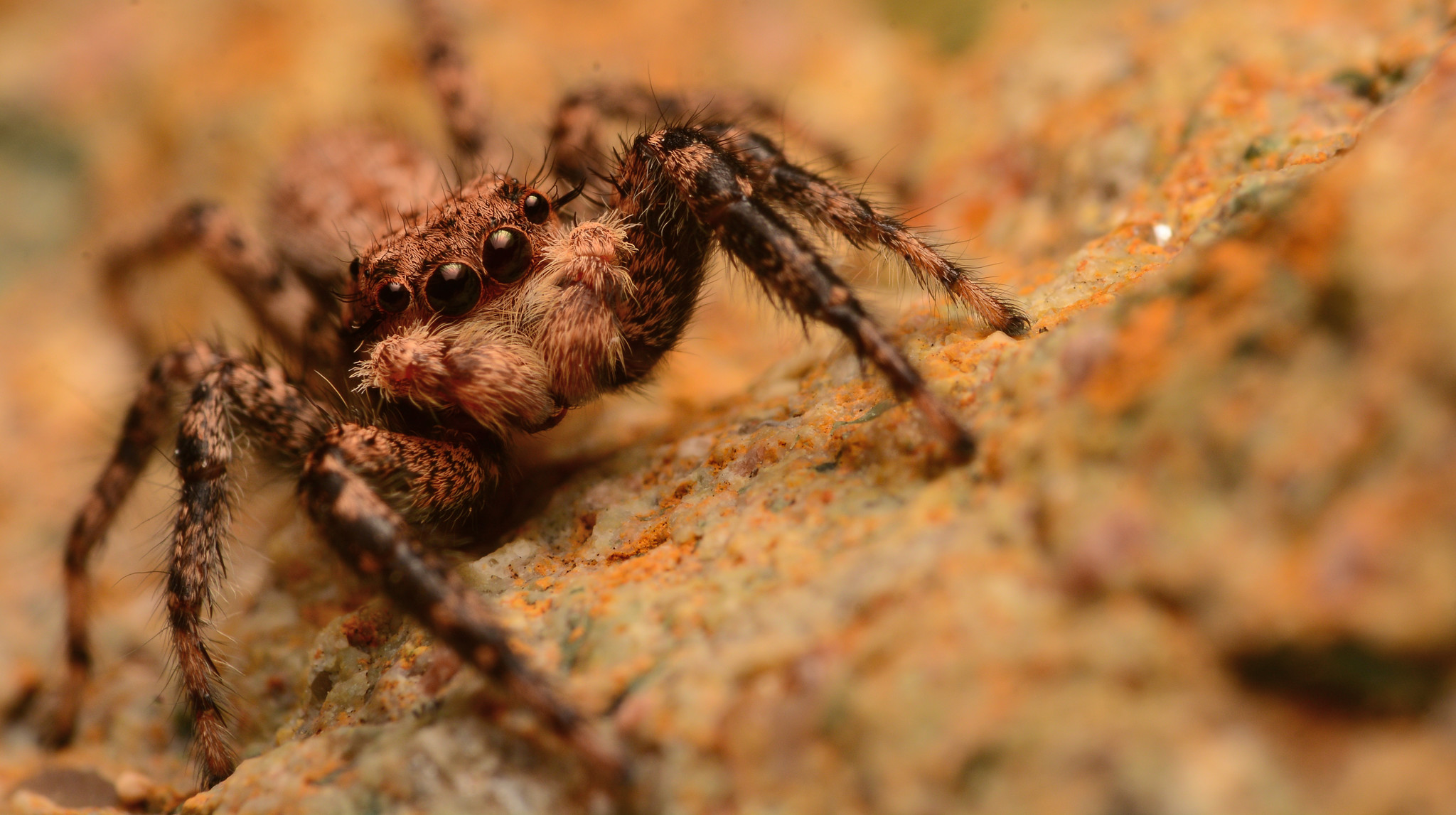
Adult male face

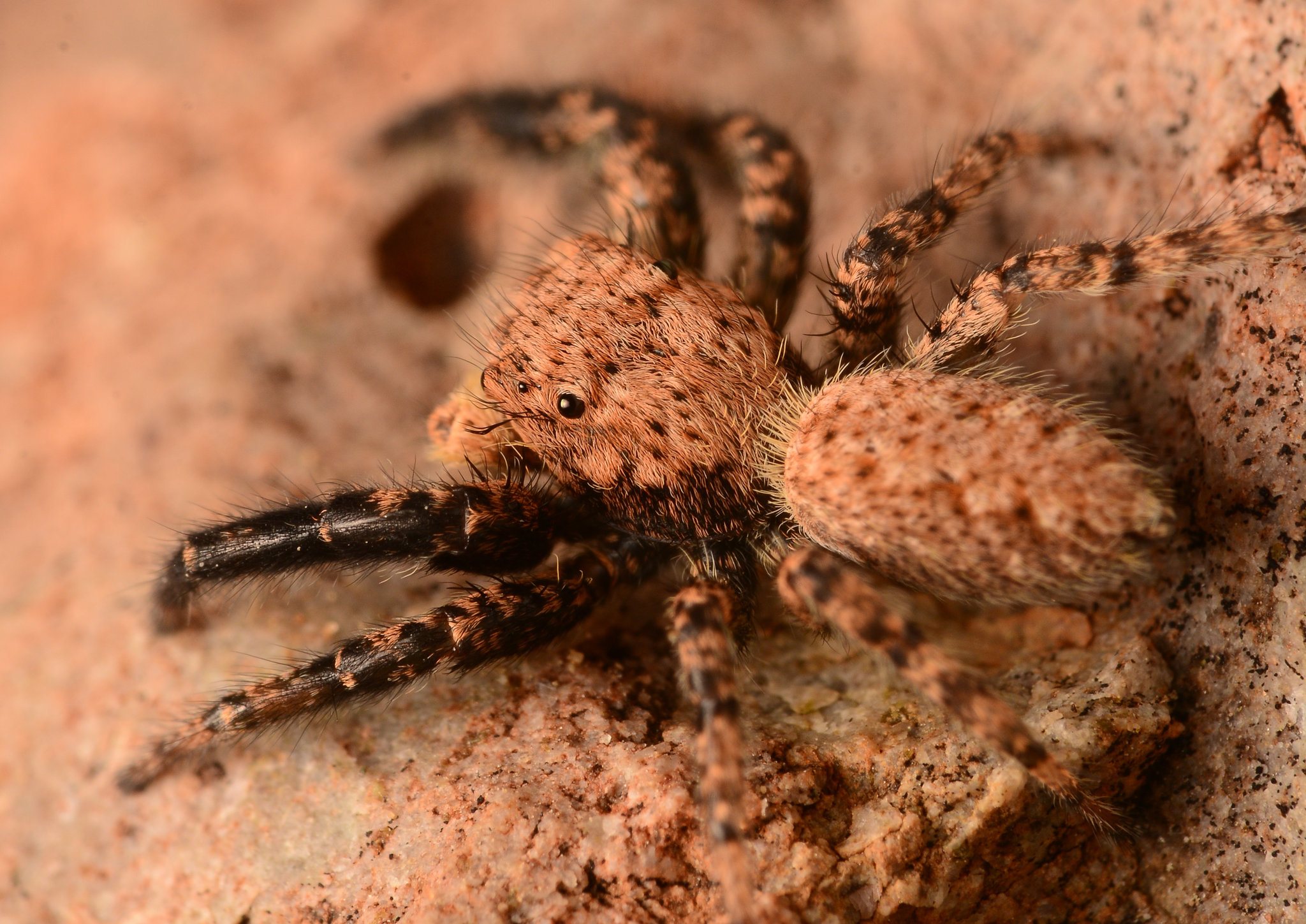
Adult male side
