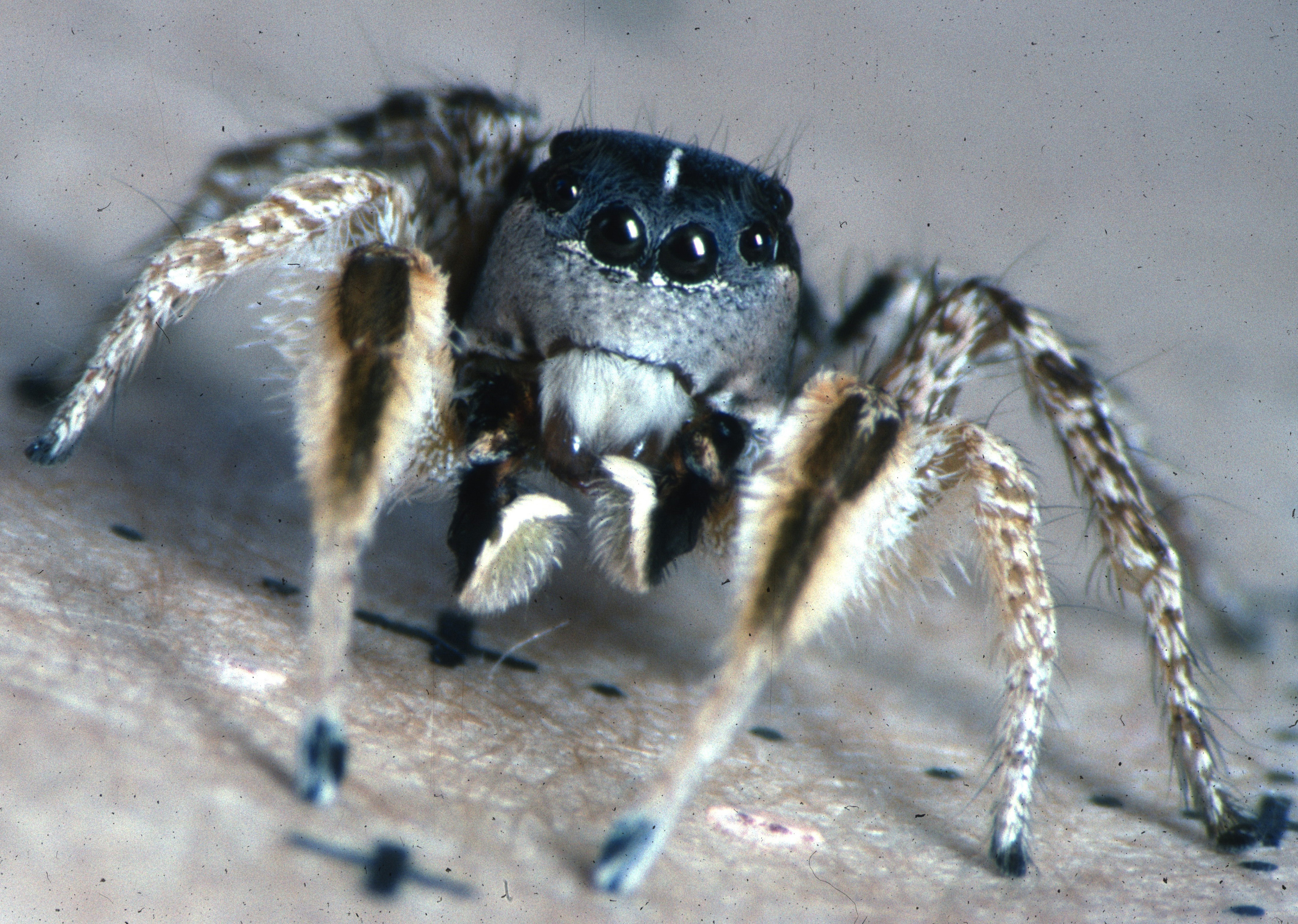
- Male from Bishop, California

Scientific classification
- Kingdom: Animalia
- Phylum: Arthropoda
- Subphylum: Chelicerata
- Class: Arachnida
- Order: Araneae
- Infraorder: Araneomorphae
- Family: Salticidae
- Genus: Habronattus
- Species: H. tarsalis

Binomial name
- Habronattus tarsalis (Banks, 1904)

= Habronattus tarsalis =

Species of spider

Habronattus tarsalis, known as the lagoon spider, is a species of jumping spider in the family Salticidae. It is found in the United States and has been introduced into Hawaii.
