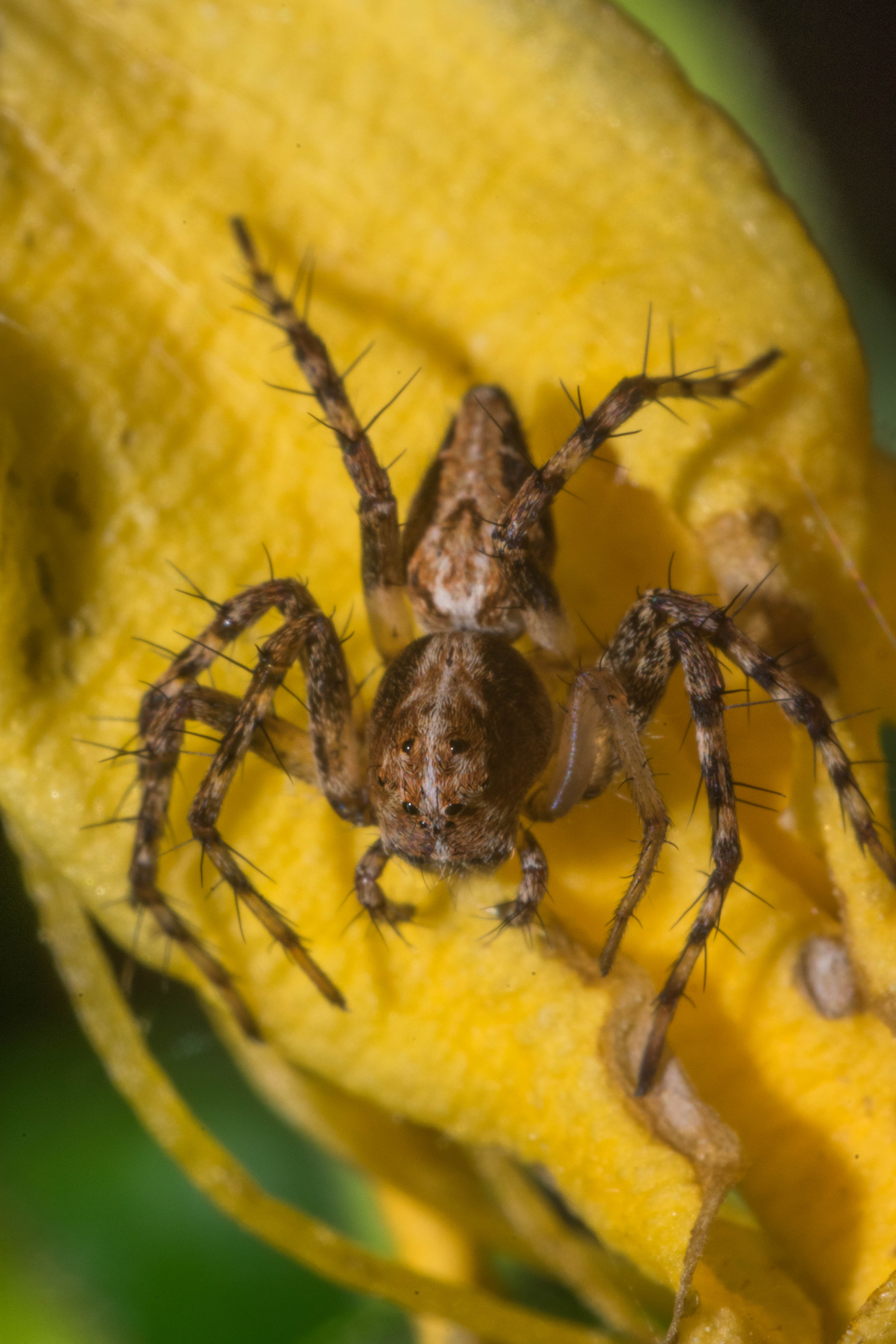

Scientific classification
- Kingdom: Animalia
- Phylum: Arthropoda
- Subphylum: Chelicerata
- Class: Arachnida
- Order: Araneae
- Infraorder: Araneomorphae
- Family: Oxyopidae
- Genus: Oxyopes
- Species: O. scalaris

Binomial name
- Oxyopes scalaris Hentz, 1845

= Oxyopes scalaris =

Species of spider

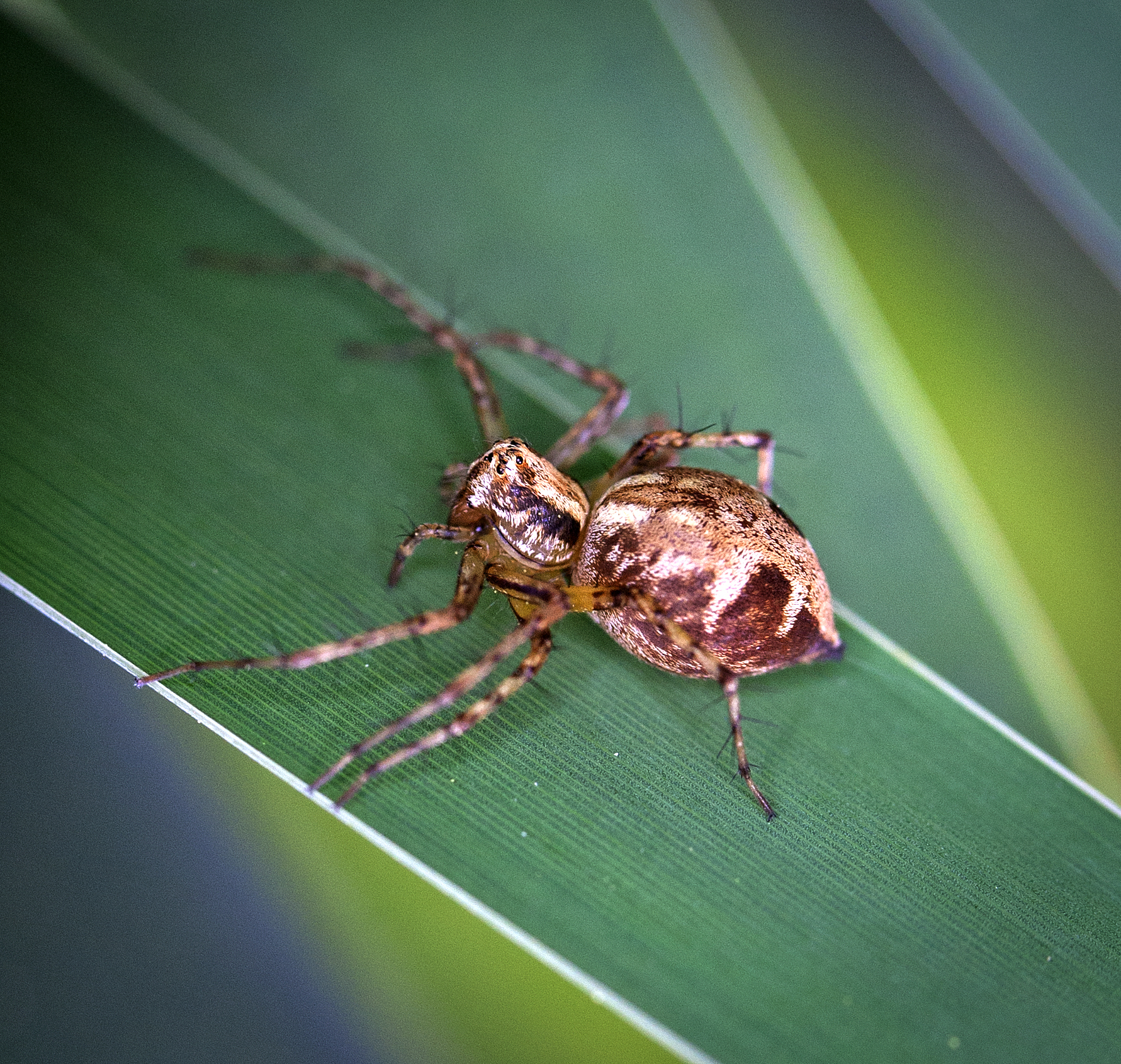
Gravid female

Male and female western lynx spiders. Female (6.5 millimeter body length) on leaf. Male on clover and approached by a Halictid bee. This species is in the lynx spider family.

Female western lynx spider with ichneumon wasp prey. This species is in the lynx spider family.

Western lynx spider jumping. At least one jump was triggered by a fast flying insect approaching. Jumps are replayed in slow motion, This species is in the lynx spider family.

Oxyopes scalaris, the western lynx spider, is a species of lynx spider in the family Oxyopidae. It is found in North America. A study based in Washington found that this species reaches adulthood and is most active in spring and early summer. They are considered beneficial in orchards.

== Behavior ==
Similar to wolf spiders and jumping spiders, western lynx spiders are active hunters that are fast runners and leapers with good vision. Rather than hunting on the ground, they often lie in wait to capture prey on plants, trees, and bushes. Their long, spiny bristles form a “basket-like” cage that may assist in capturing prey and providing the spider with some protection.

They don’t spin webs, but use silk for other purposes including safety lines and their egg sacks.
