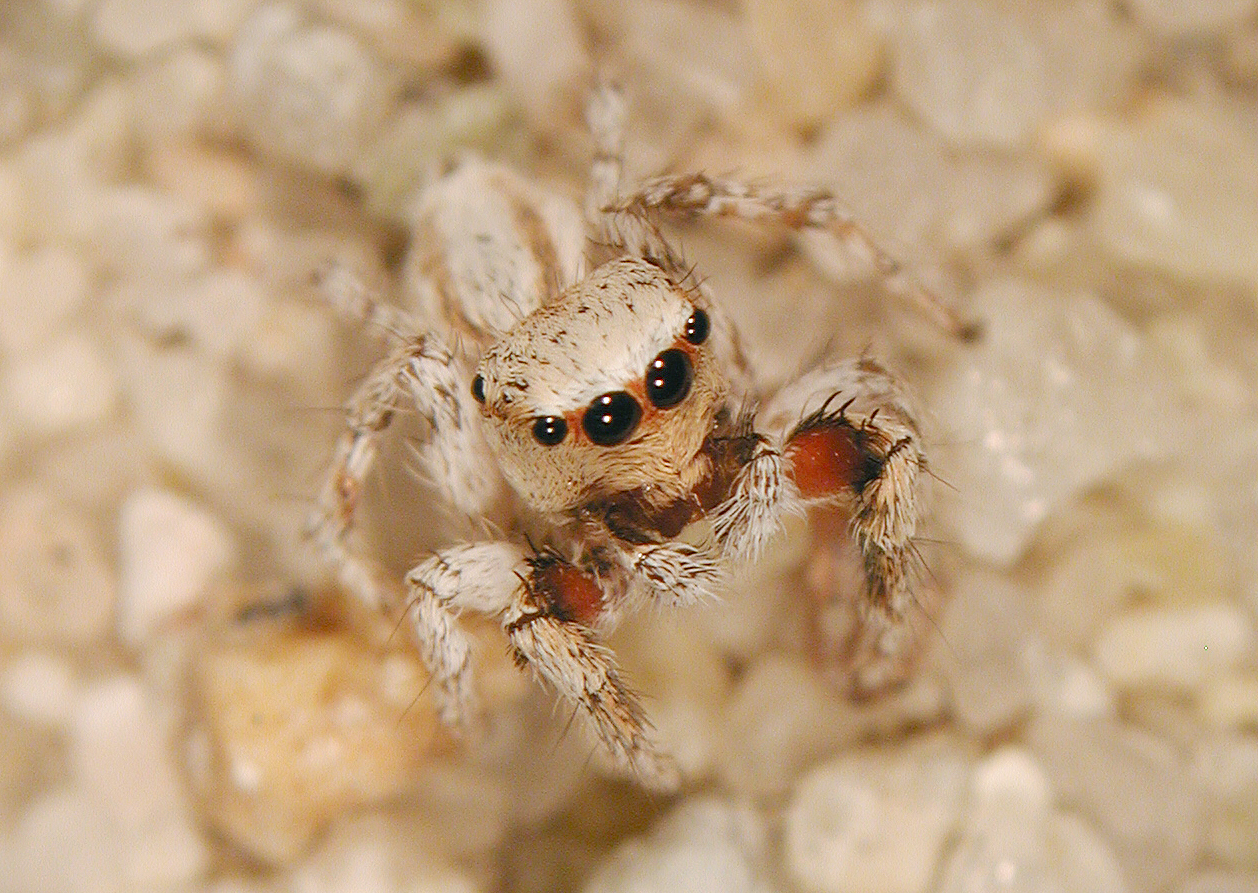

Scientific classification
- Kingdom: Animalia
- Phylum: Arthropoda
- Subphylum: Chelicerata
- Class: Arachnida
- Order: Araneae
- Infraorder: Araneomorphae
- Family: Salticidae
- Genus: Habronattus
- Species: H. signatus

Binomial name
- Habronattus signatus (Banks, 1900)

= Habronattus signatus =

Species of spider

Habronattus signatus is a species of jumping spider in the family Salticidae. It is found in the United States and Mexico.
