= Meriola decepta =

Scientific classification
- Domain: Eukaryota
- Kingdom: Animalia
- Phylum: Arthropoda
- Subphylum: Chelicerata
- Class: Arachnida
- Order: Araneae
- Infraorder: Araneomorphae
- Family: Trachelidae
- Genus: Meriola
- Species: M. decepta

Binomial name
- Meriola decepta Banks, 1895

Species of spider

Meriola decepta is a species of true spider in the family Trachelidae. It is found in a range from the United States to Guatemala, Colombia, Ecuador, Peru, and Brazil.
