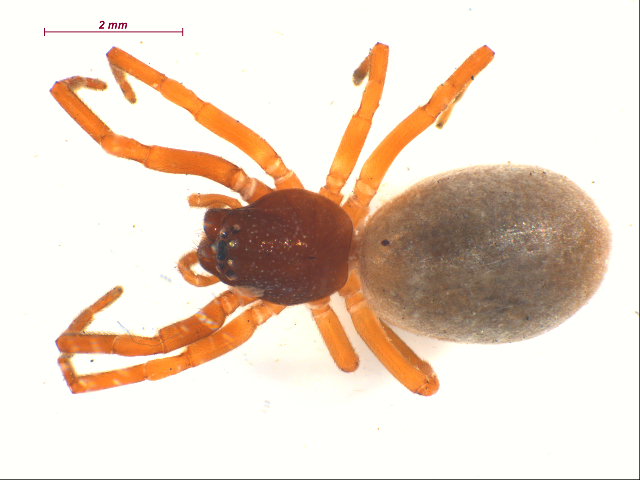
- Meriola californica

Scientific classification
- Domain: Eukaryota
- Kingdom: Animalia
- Phylum: Arthropoda
- Subphylum: Chelicerata
- Class: Arachnida
- Order: Araneae
- Infraorder: Araneomorphae
- Family: Trachelidae
- Genus: Meriola; Banks, 1895

Type species
- M. decepta Banks, 1895

Species
- 24, see text

= Meriola =

Genus of spiders

Meriola is a genus of araneomorph spiders in the family Trachelidae, first described by Nathan Banks in 1895.

== Species ==
As of April 2019 it contains twenty-four species, three from the United States and Canada:

- Meriola arcifera (Simon, 1886) – Chile, Bolivia, Argentina. Introduced to USA (California, Hawaii)
- Meriola balcarce Platnick & Ewing, 1995 – Argentina
- Meriola barrosi (Mello-Leitão, 1951) – Chile, Argentina
- Meriola californica (Banks, 1904) – USA (Pacific Coast and Baja California), Mexico
- Meriola cetiformis (Strand, 1908) – Peru, Brazil, Bolivia, Chile, Argentina
- Meriola davidi Grismado, 2004 – Argentina
- Meriola decepta Banks, 1895 (type) – Eastern to Midwest United States & south to Guatemala, Colombia, Ecuador, Peru, Brazil
- Meriola fasciata (Mello-Leitão, 1941) – Brazil, Argentina
- Meriola foraminosa (Keyserling, 1891) – Venezuela to Chile
- Meriola gallina Platnick & Ewing, 1995 – Chile
- Meriola goloboffi Platnick & Ewing, 1995 – Argentina
- Meriola hyltonae (Mello-Leitão, 1940) – Brazil, Argentina
- Meriola longitarsis (Simon, 1904) – Chile, Argentina
- Meriola manuel Platnick & Ewing, 1995 – Chile
- Meriola mauryi Platnick & Ewing, 1995 – Argentina
- Meriola nague Platnick & Ewing, 1995 – Chile
- Meriola penai Platnick & Ewing, 1995 – Chile, Argentina
- Meriola puyehue Platnick & Ewing, 1995 – Chile, Argentina
- Meriola quilicura Platnick & Ewing, 1995 – Chile
- Meriola rahue Platnick & Ewing, 1995 – Argentina
- Meriola ramirezi Platnick & Ewing, 1995 – Argentina
- Meriola tablas Platnick & Ewing, 1995 – Chile, Argentina
- Meriola teresita Platnick & Ewing, 1995 – Argentina
- Meriola virgata (Simon, 1904) – Chile
