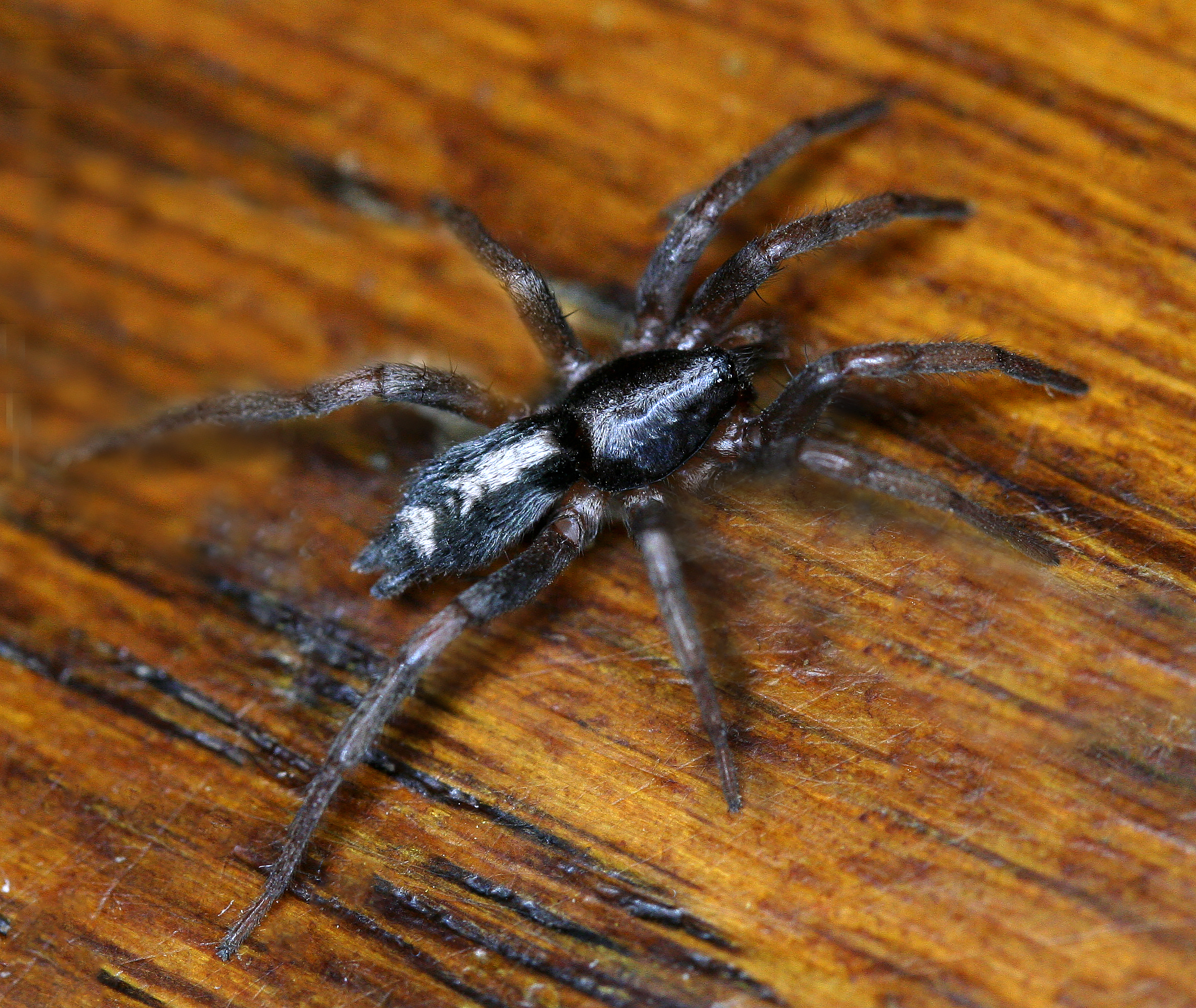
- Herpyllus ecclesiasticus

Scientific classification
- Kingdom: Animalia
- Phylum: Arthropoda
- Subphylum: Chelicerata
- Class: Arachnida
- Order: Araneae
- Infraorder: Araneomorphae
- Family: Gnaphosidae
- Genus: Herpyllus; Hentz, 1832

Type species
- H. ecclesiasticus Hentz, 1832

Species
- 33, see text

Synonyms
- Bonna O. Pickard-Cambridge, 1898

= Herpyllus =

Genus of spiders

Herpyllus is a genus of ground spiders first described by Nicholas Marcellus Hentz in 1832.

== Species ==
As of May 2019 it contains thirty-three species, including thirteen from North America:

- Herpyllus australis (Holmberg, 1881) – Argentina
- Herpyllus bensonae Fox, 1938 – Mexico
- Herpyllus brachet Platnick & Shadab, 1977 – Mexico
- Herpyllus bubulcus Chamberlin, 1922 – USA, Mexico
- Herpyllus calcuttaensis Biswas, 1984 – India
- Herpyllus coahuilanus Gertsch & Davis, 1940 – Mexico
- Herpyllus cockerelli (Banks, 1901) – USA, Mexico
- Herpyllus convallis Chamberlin, 1936 – USA, Mexico
- Herpyllus coreanus Paik, 1992 – Korea
- Herpyllus ecclesiasticus Hentz, 1832 (type) – North America
- Herpyllus emertoni Bryant, 1935 – USA
- Herpyllus excelsus Fox, 1938 – USA, Mexico
- Herpyllus fidelis (O. Pickard-Cambridge, 1898) – Mexico
- Herpyllus frio Platnick & Shadab, 1977 – Mexico
- Herpyllus gertschi Platnick & Shadab, 1977 – USA, Mexico
- Herpyllus giganteus Platnick & Shadab, 1977 – Mexico
- Herpyllus goaensis Tikader, 1982 – India
- Herpyllus hesperolus Chamberlin, 1928 – North America
- Herpyllus iguala Platnick & Shadab, 1977 – Mexico
- Herpyllus lativulvus Denis, 1958 – Afghanistan
- Herpyllus malkini Platnick & Shadab, 1977 – Mexico
- Herpyllus paropanisadensis Denis, 1958 – Afghanistan
- Herpyllus perditus (Banks, 1898) – Mexico
- Herpyllus perote Platnick & Shadab, 1977 – Mexico
- Herpyllus pictus (F. O. Pickard-Cambridge, 1899) – Mexico
- Herpyllus propinquus (Keyserling, 1887) – North America
- Herpyllus proximus Denis, 1958 – Turkmenistan, Afghanistan
- Herpyllus regnans Chamberlin, 1936 – USA
- Herpyllus reservatus Chamberlin, 1936 – USA, Mexico
- Herpyllus scholasticus Chamberlin, 1922 – USA
- Herpyllus schwarzi (Banks, 1901) – USA
- Herpyllus sherus Platnick & Shadab, 1977 – Mexico
- Herpyllus vicinus Denis, 1958 – Afghanistan

== See also ==
- Cesonia
