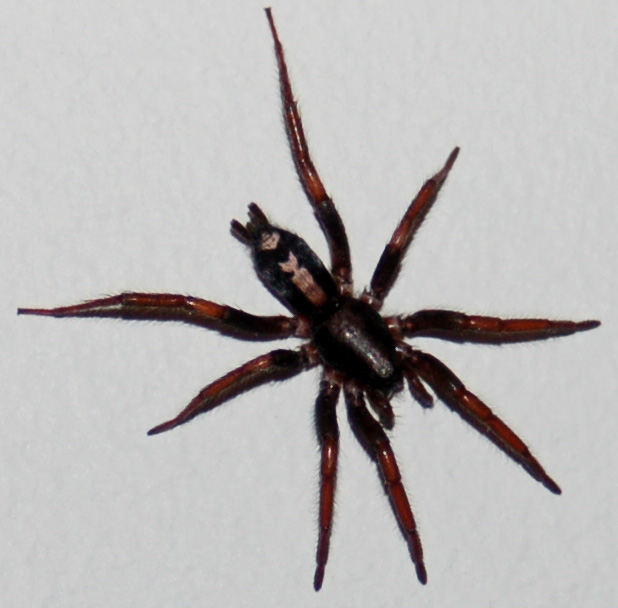
- Herpyllus ecclesiasticus

Scientific classification
- Kingdom: Animalia
- Phylum: Arthropoda
- Subphylum: Chelicerata
- Class: Arachnida
- Order: Araneae
- Infraorder: Araneomorphae
- Family: Gnaphosidae
- Genus: Herpyllus
- Species: H. ecclesiasticus

Binomial name
- Herpyllus ecclesiasticus Hentz, 1832

Synonyms
- Drassus vasifer Prosthesima bimaculata Prosthesima ecclesiastica Melanophora bimaculata Herpyllus vasifer Herpyllus cratus Zelotes bryanti

= Herpyllus ecclesiasticus =

Eastern parson spider

Species of spider

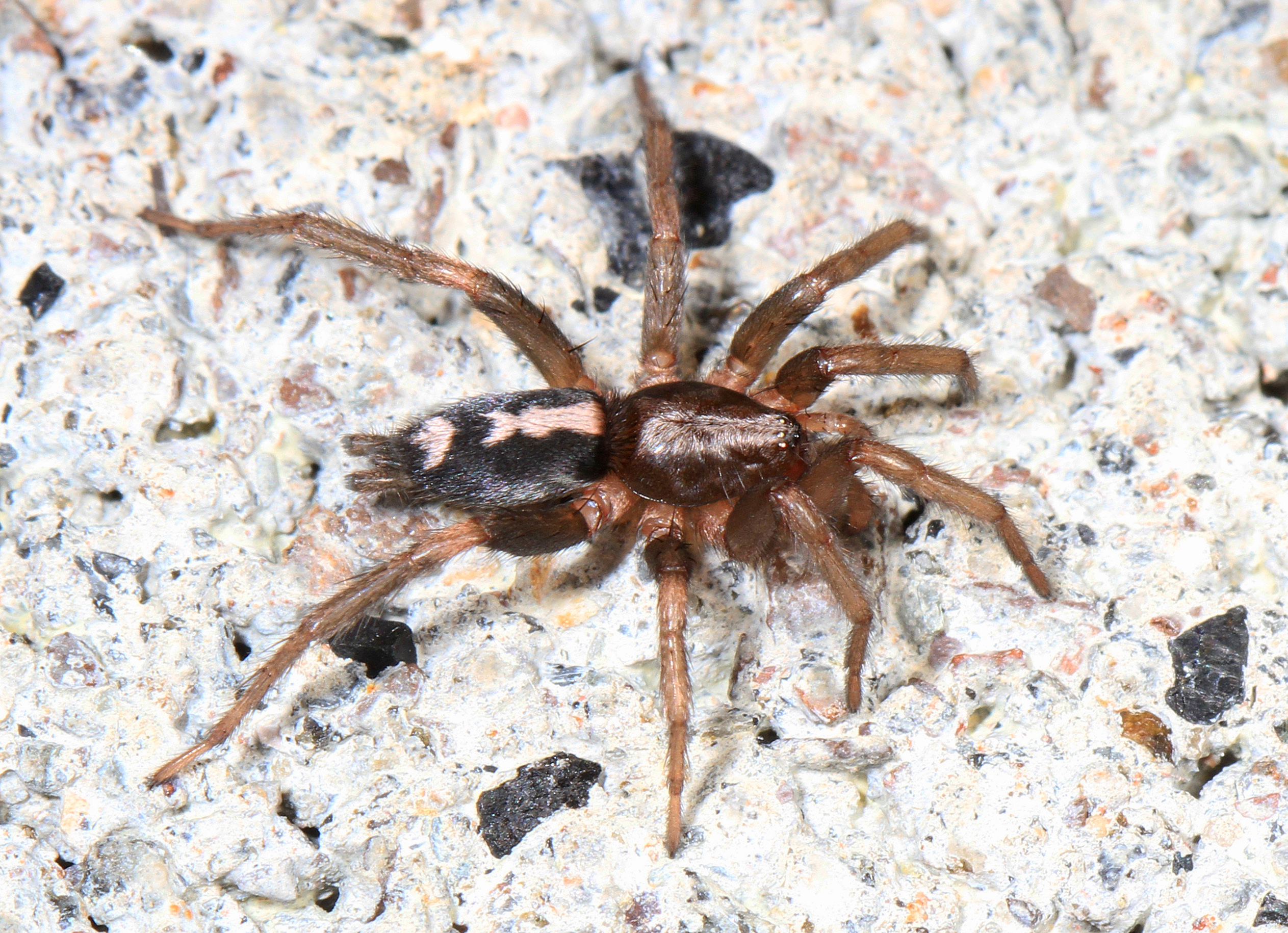
In Woodbridge, Virginia

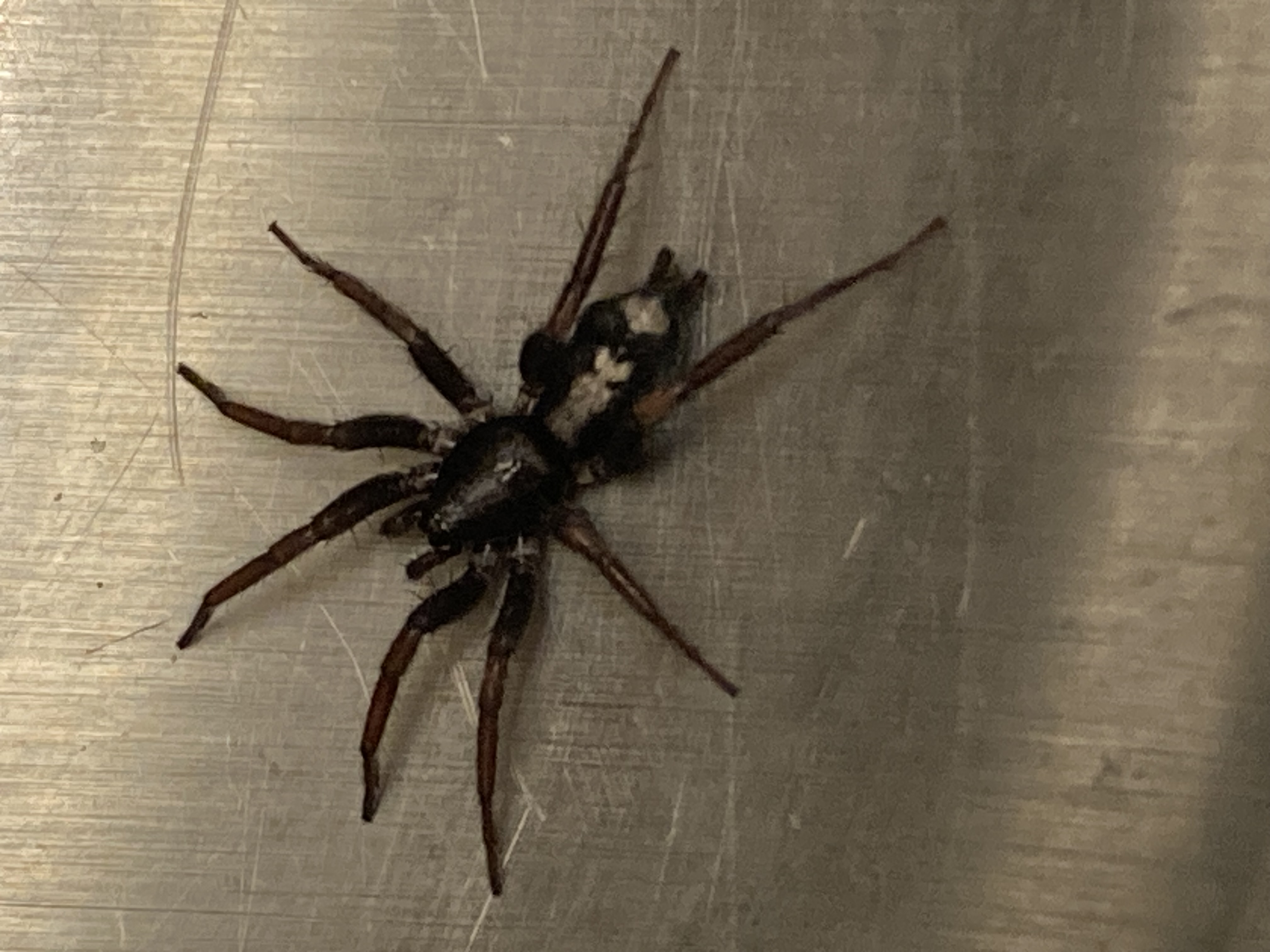
In Hardy County, West Virginia

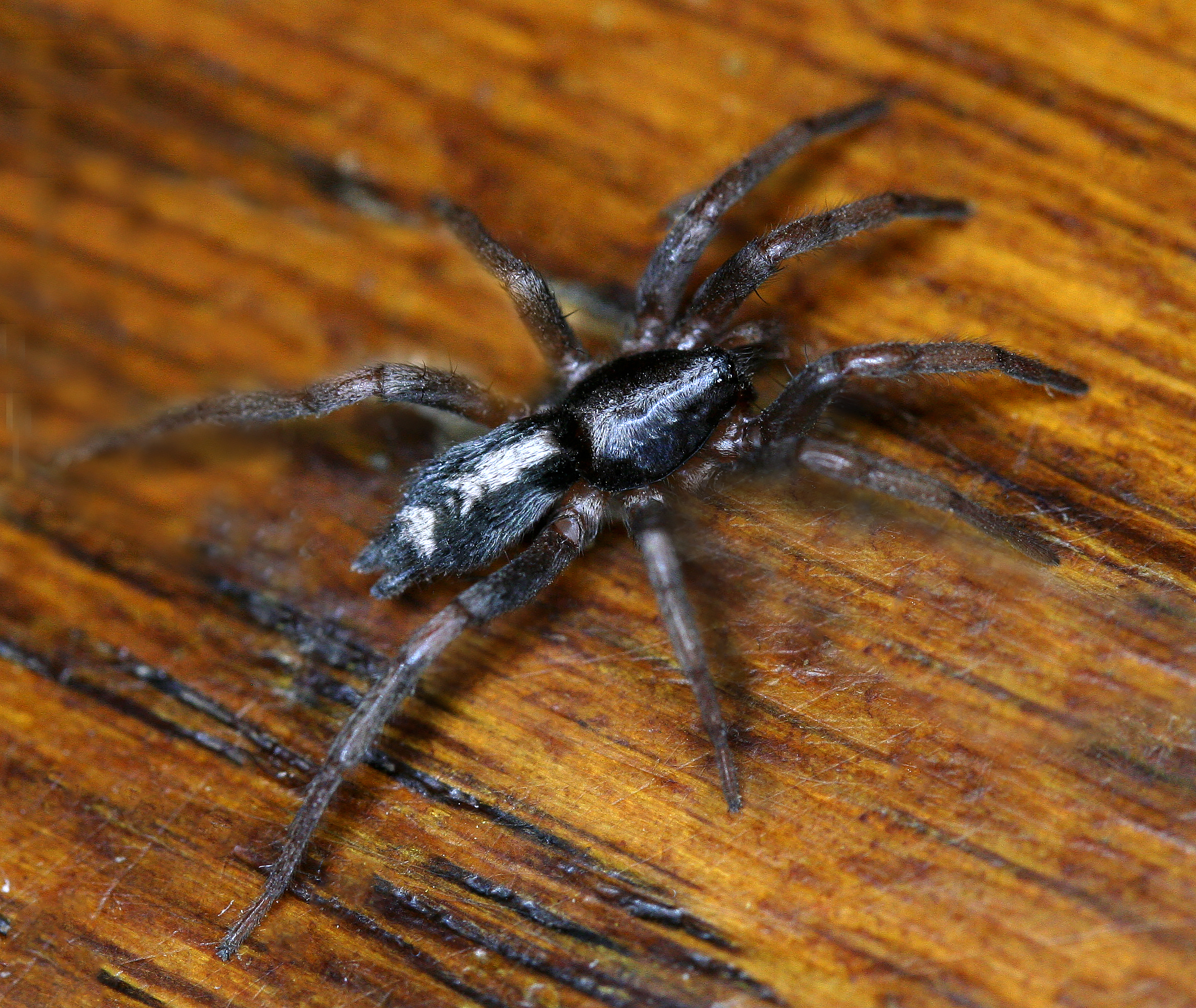

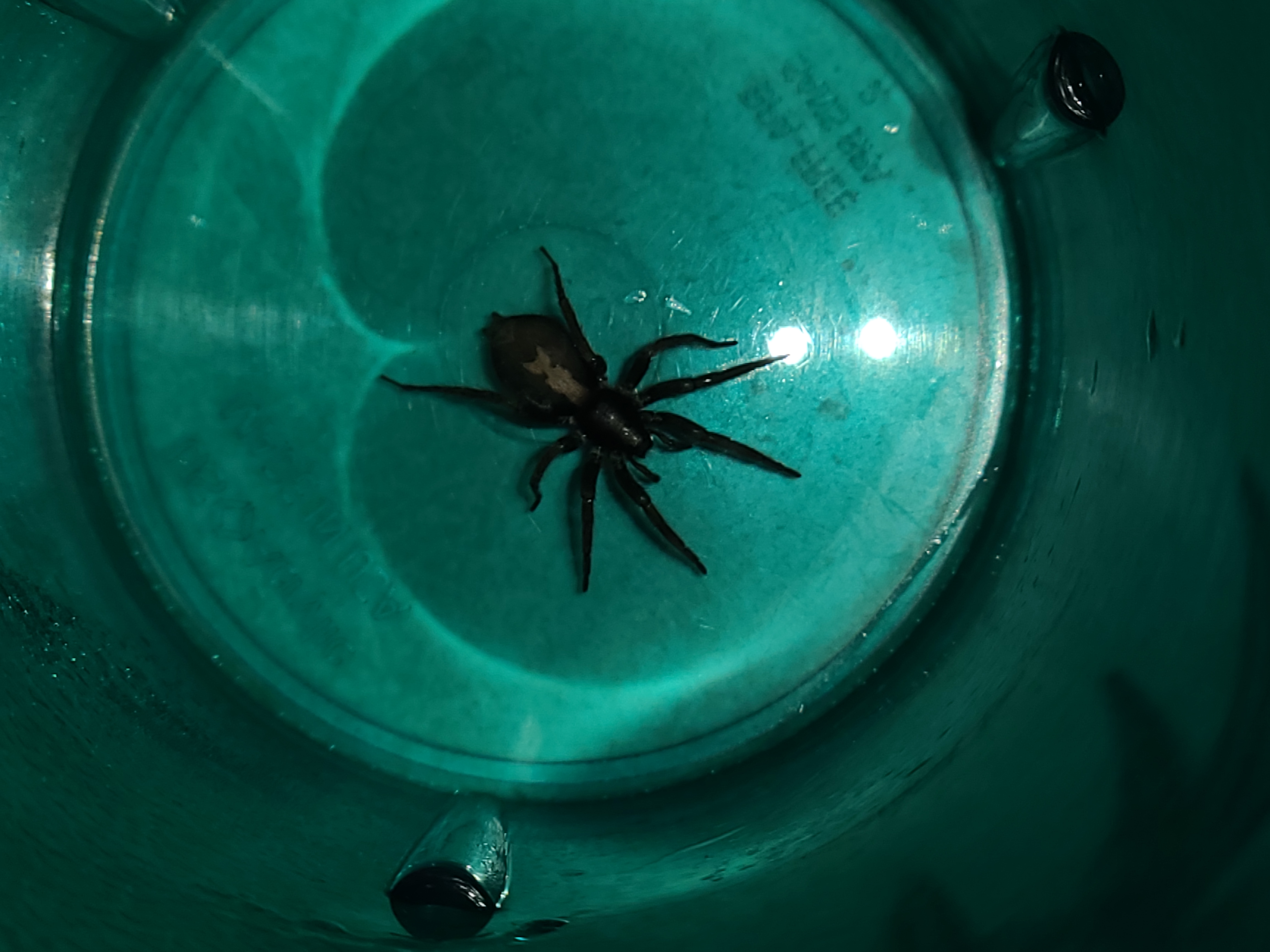
In Peotone, Illinois

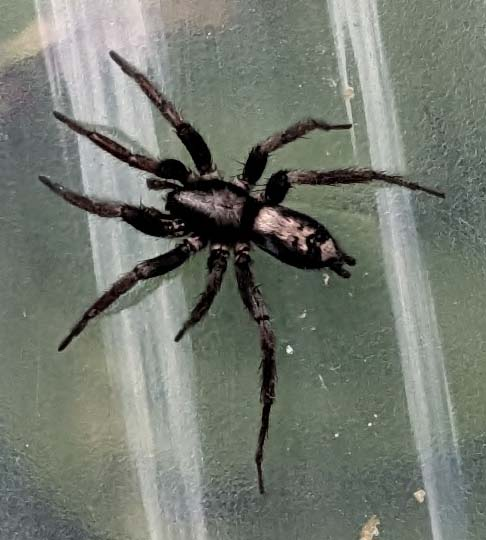
In Kerhonkson, New York

Herpyllus ecclesiasticus, commonly called the eastern parson spider, is a species of spider named after the abdominal markings resembling an old-style cravat worn by clergy in the 18th century. It is mainly found in North America east of the Rocky Mountains, from Alberta east to Nova Scotia in Canada, and south through the United States to Tamaulipas, Mexico, and Florida. Individuals can be found throughout the year, both in homes and under rocks or logs in deciduous forests.

== Description ==
Individuals are covered with black hairs on the cephalothorax and gray hairs on the abdomen. On the back is the distinctive white mark that gives the species its common name; there is a small white spot above the spinnerets.

== Behavior ==
During the day, individuals reside in silken retreats. They emerge to hunt at night, actively chasing prey rather than lying in wait. They do not spin webs. They enter houses more often than other spiders while wandering for prey, and, as ground spiders, are usually spotted on the floor or low walls. They flee danger very swiftly.

== Bite ==
Bites are painful, and some individuals may experience an allergic reaction.
