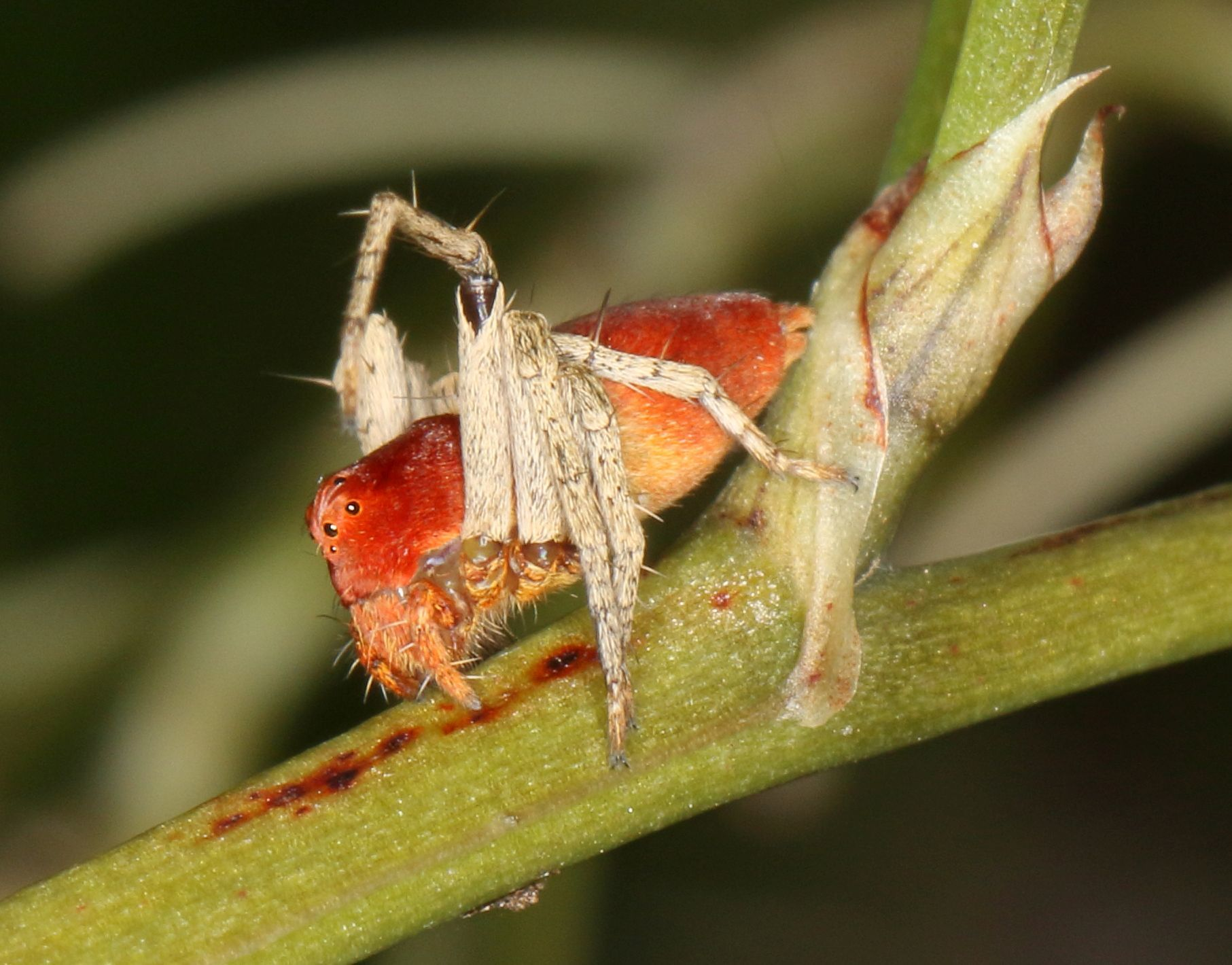

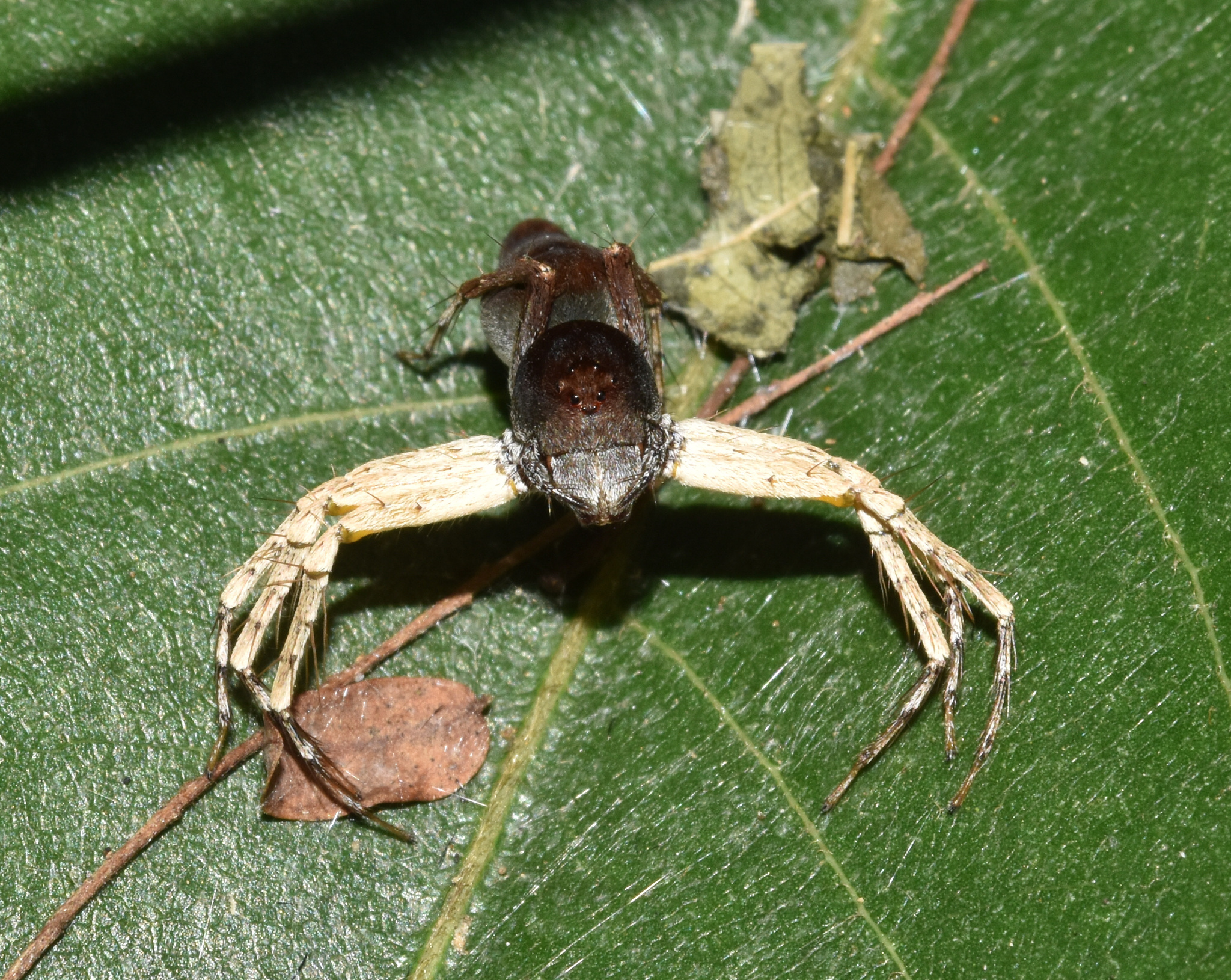

Scientific classification
- Kingdom: Animalia
- Phylum: Arthropoda
- Subphylum: Chelicerata
- Class: Arachnida
- Order: Araneae
- Infraorder: Araneomorphae
- Family: Oxyopidae
- Genus: Oxyopes
- Species: O. flavipalpis

Binomial name
- Oxyopes flavipalpis (Lucas, 1858)

Synonyms
- Sphasus flavipalpis Lucas, 1858; Oxyopes dorsualis Thorell, 1899

= Oxyopes flavipalpis =

Velvet Lynx Spider

Species of spider

Oxyopes flavipalpis is a species of spider in the family Oxyopidae. It is commonly known as the velvet lynx spider.

== Distribution ==
Oxyopes flavipalpis occurs in Ethiopia, Somalia, Cameroon, Democratic Republic of the Congo, Guinea, Tanzania, Zimbabwe, South Africa, and Eswatini. In South Africa, the species has been recorded from multiple provinces at altitudes ranging from 52 to 1,694 m above sea level.

== Habitat and ecology ==
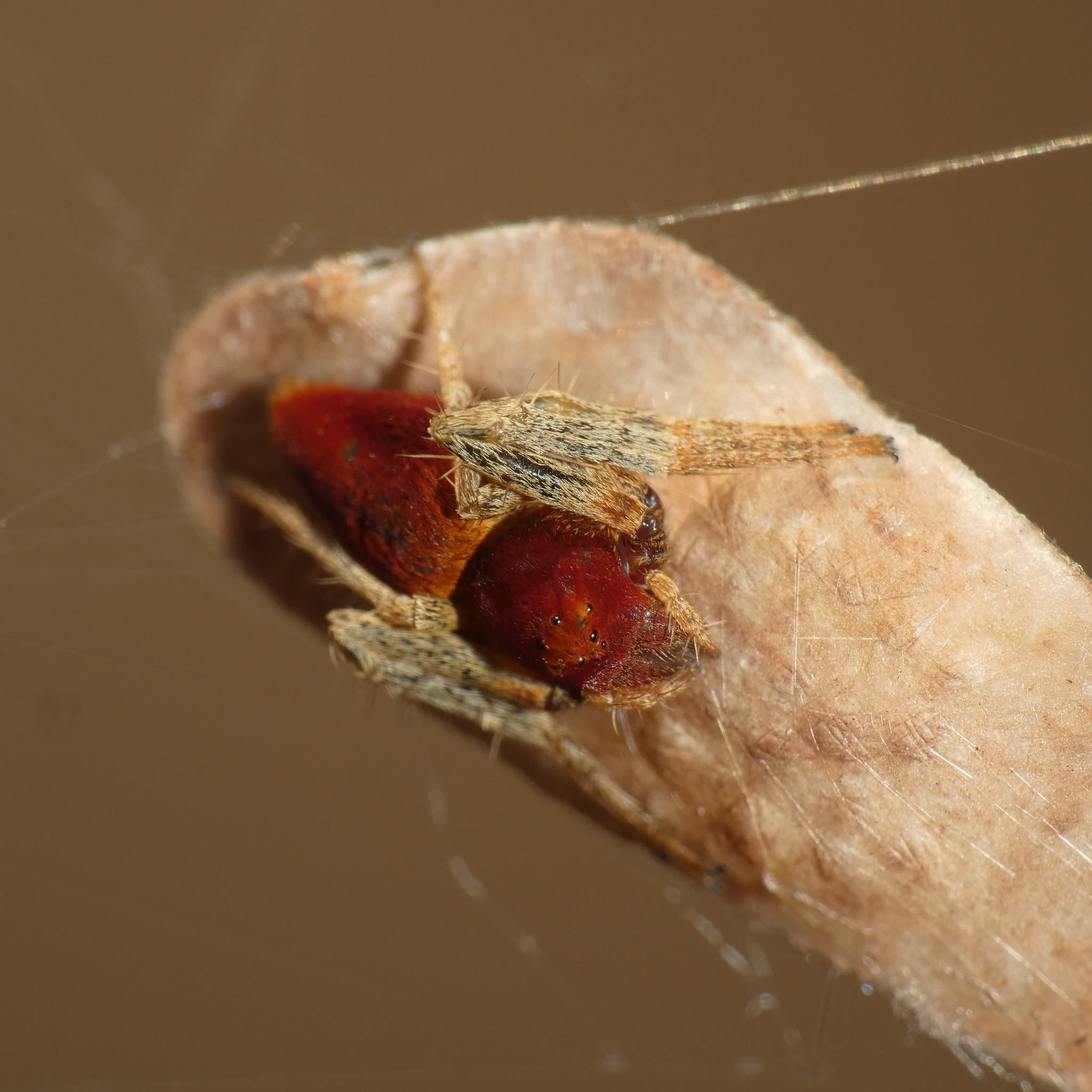

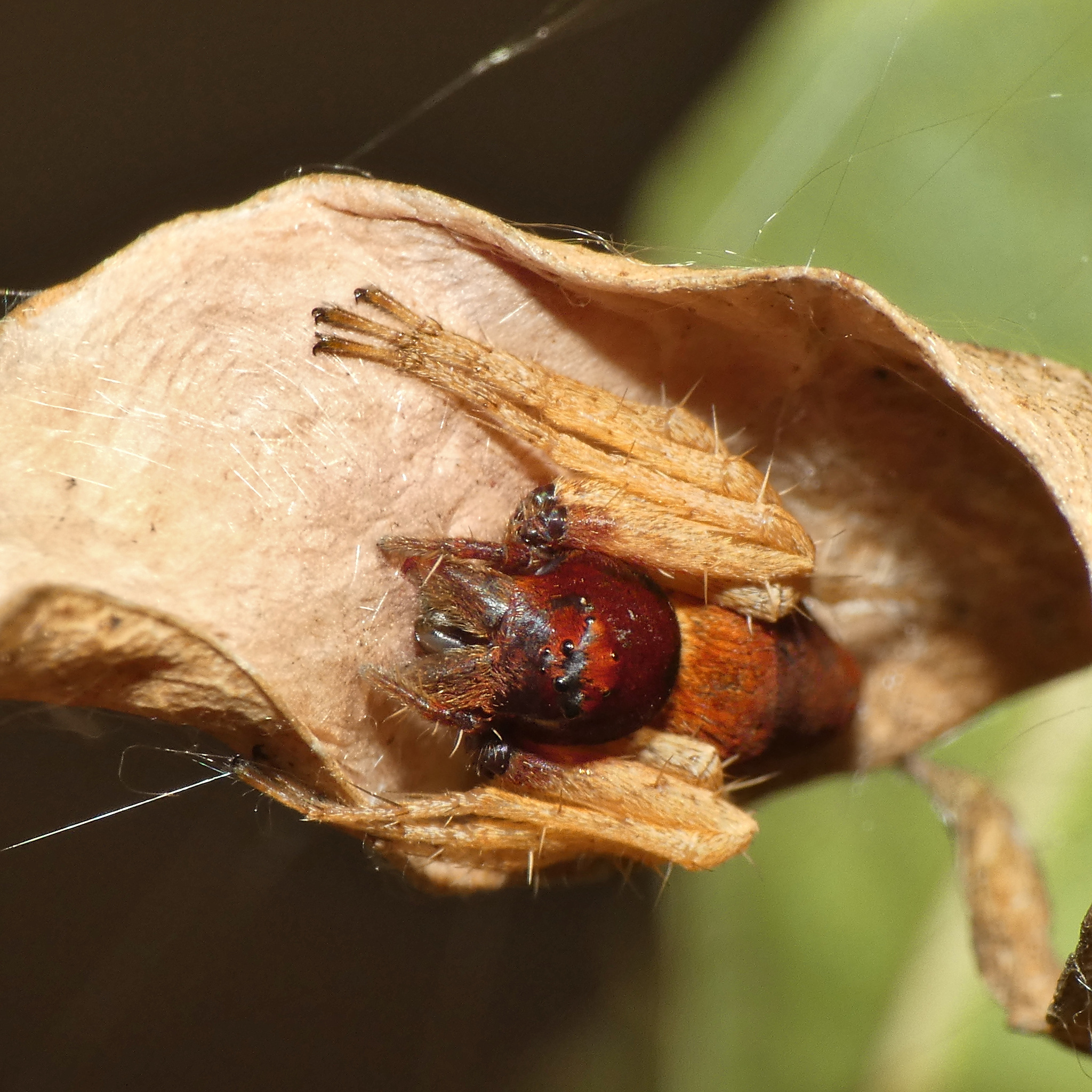

The species has been found on grasses and trees across multiple biomes including Forest, Fynbos, Grassland, Savanna, and Thicket biomes. The species creates irregular pinkish egg sacs on leaf surfaces and has also been found in sugar cane fields, demonstrating its adaptability to agricultural environments.

== Description ==
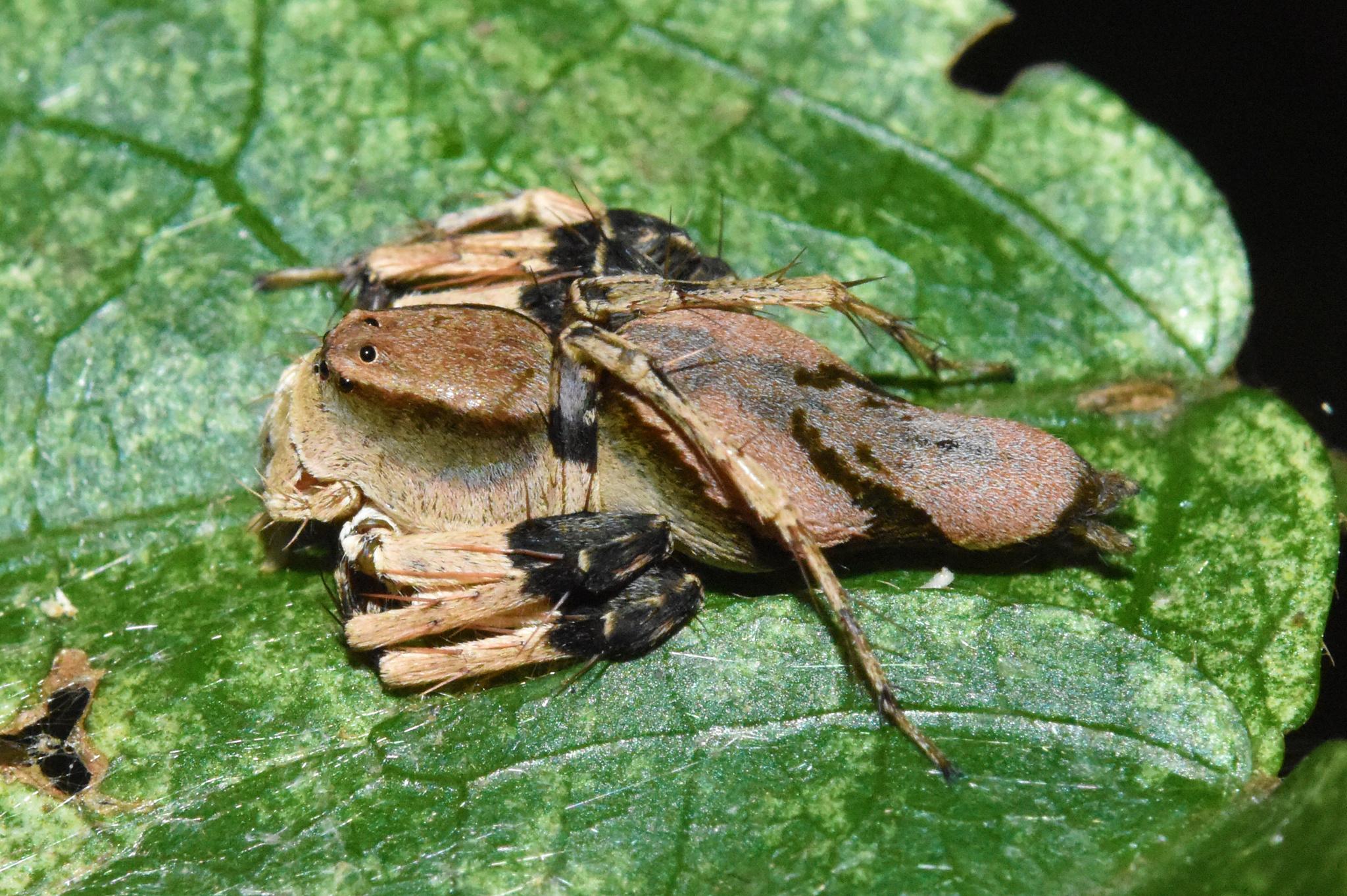

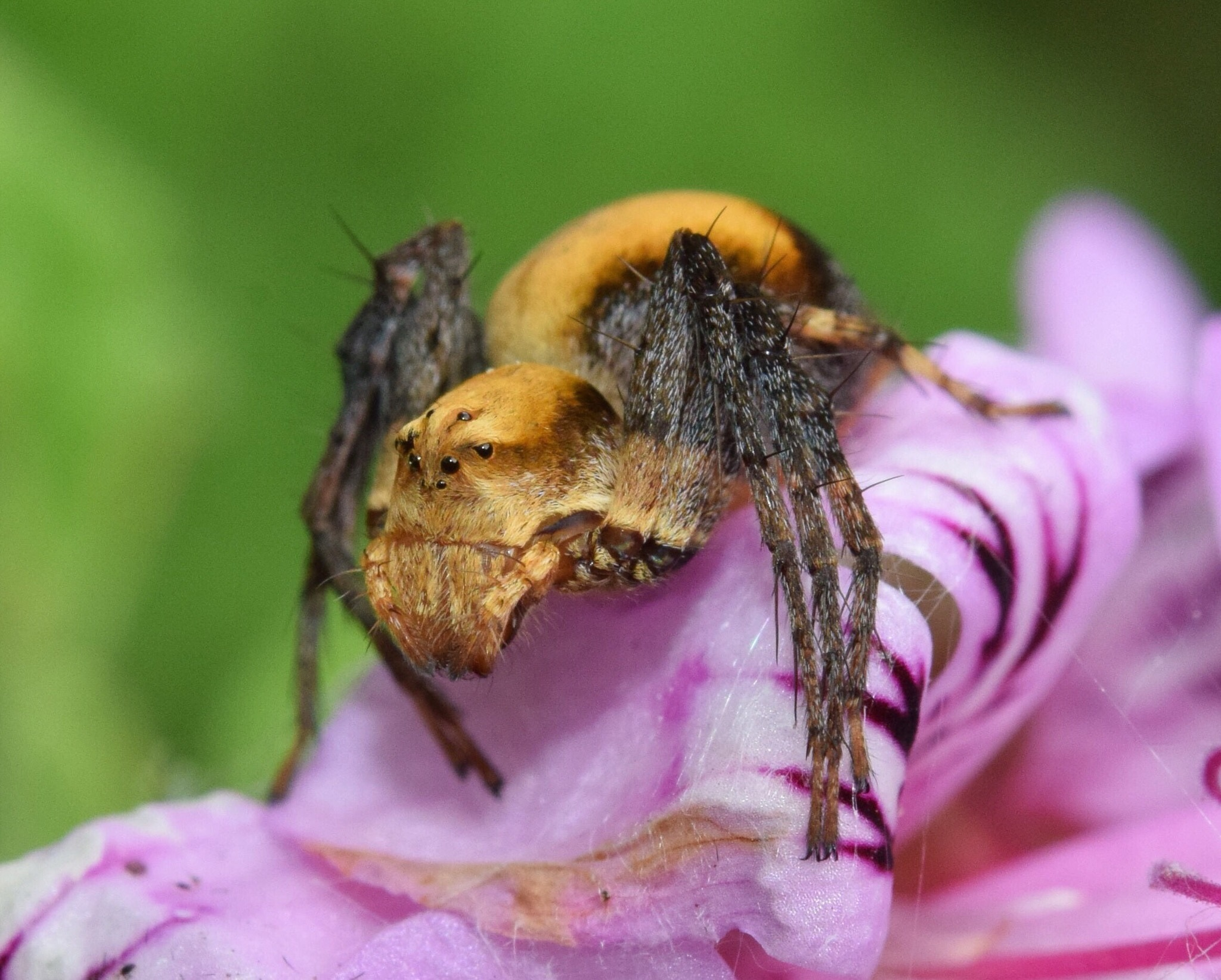

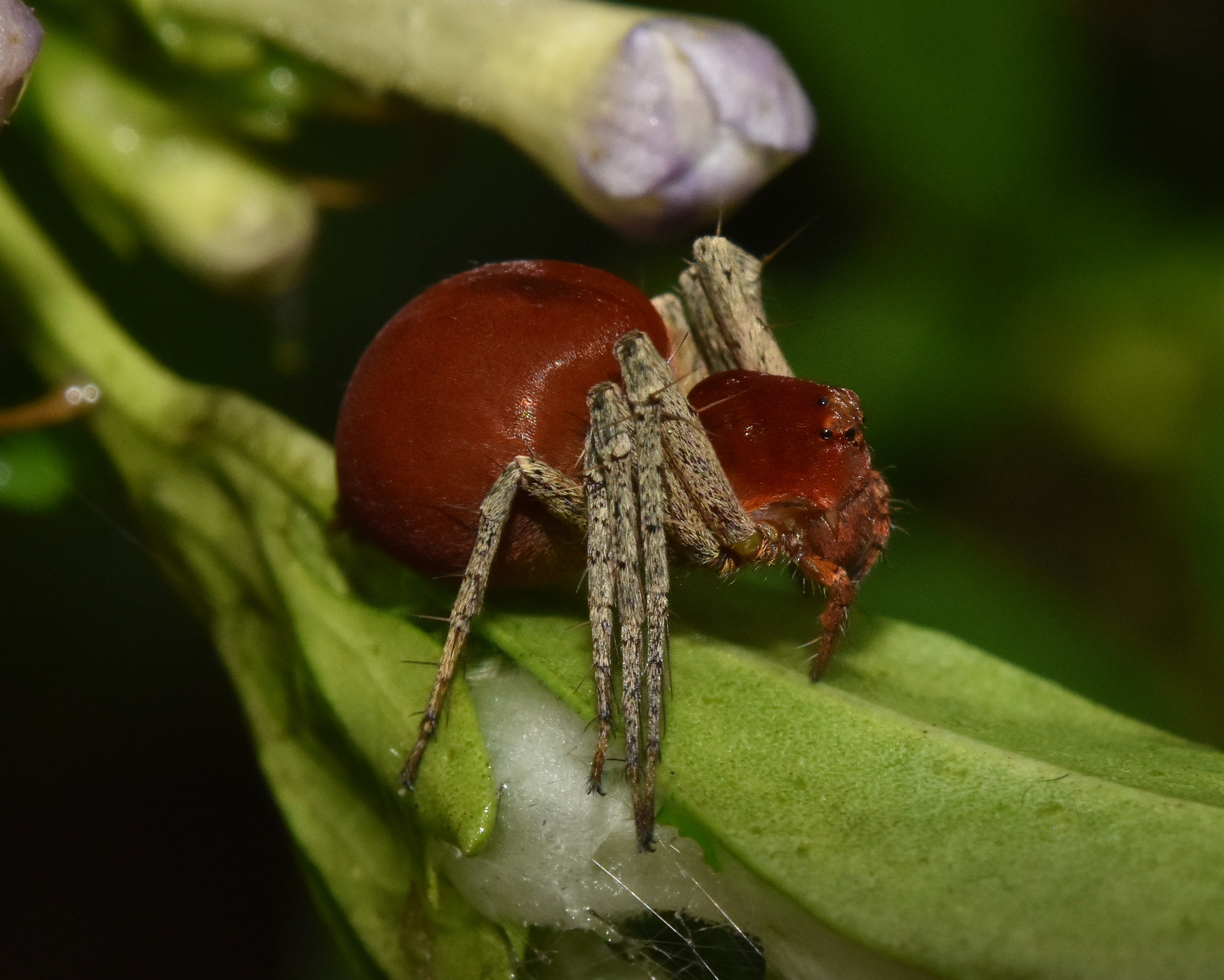

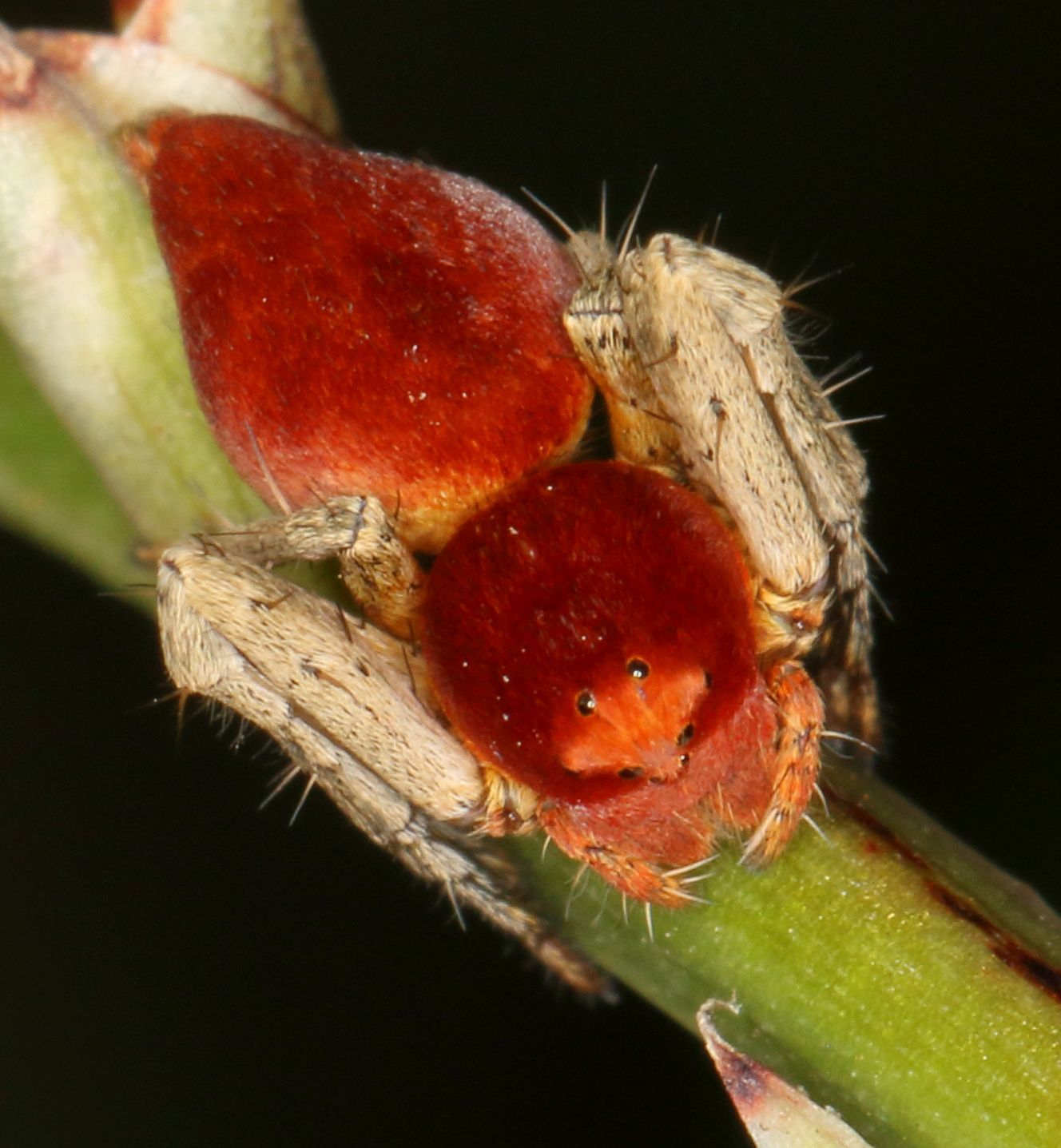

Oxyopes flavipalpis is known from both sexes. The color appears to vary between specimens while maintaining the same epigyne shape in females, though this variation requires confirmation through taxonomic revision.

== Conservation ==
Oxyopes flavipalpis is listed as Least Concern by the South African National Biodiversity Institute due to its wide distribution across multiple African countries. The species is protected in more than eight protected areas and faces no significant threats.
