= Oxyopes cornifrons =

Conservation status
- Least Concern (SANBI Red List)

Scientific classification
- Kingdom: Animalia
- Phylum: Arthropoda
- Subphylum: Chelicerata
- Class: Arachnida
- Order: Araneae
- Infraorder: Araneomorphae
- Family: Oxyopidae
- Genus: Oxyopes
- Species: O. cornifrons

Binomial name
- Oxyopes cornifrons (Thorell, 1899)

Species of spider

Oxyopes cornifrons is a species of spider originally described by Thorell in 1899. It is found in Cameroon and Guinea-Bissau.

== Subspecies ==
The subspecies Oxyopes cornifrons avakubensis was described by Lessert in 1927.

=== Distribution ===
The subspecies occurs in Cameroon, Guinea-Bissau, and South Africa. In South Africa, it is known only from Kei River Mouth in the Eastern Cape at 52 m above sea level.

=== Habitat and ecology ===
The subspecies has been found in the coastal environment of the Eastern Cape, specifically in areas within the Indian Ocean Coastal Belt biome.

=== Description ===
Oxyopes cornifrons avakubensis is known from both males and females, while the nominate species O. cornifrons is known only from females. The subspecies exhibits typical lynx spider morphology with long, slender legs bearing prominent spines.

=== Conservation ===
Oxyopes cornifrons avakubensis is listed as Least Concern by the South African National Biodiversity Institute despite being known from a limited range, due to the wide geographical distribution of the species complex. The subspecies appears to be under-sampled in South Africa.
