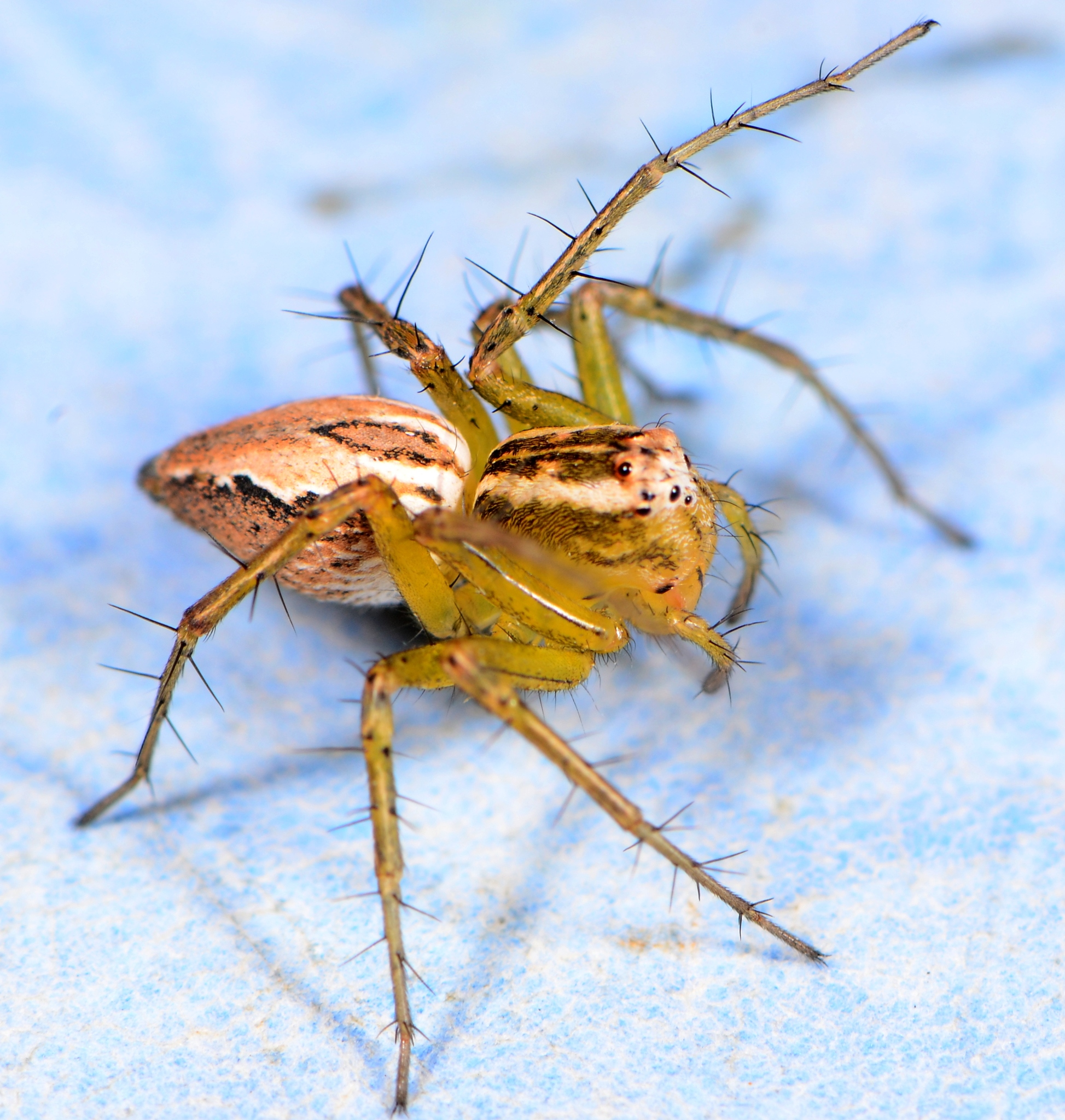
- female
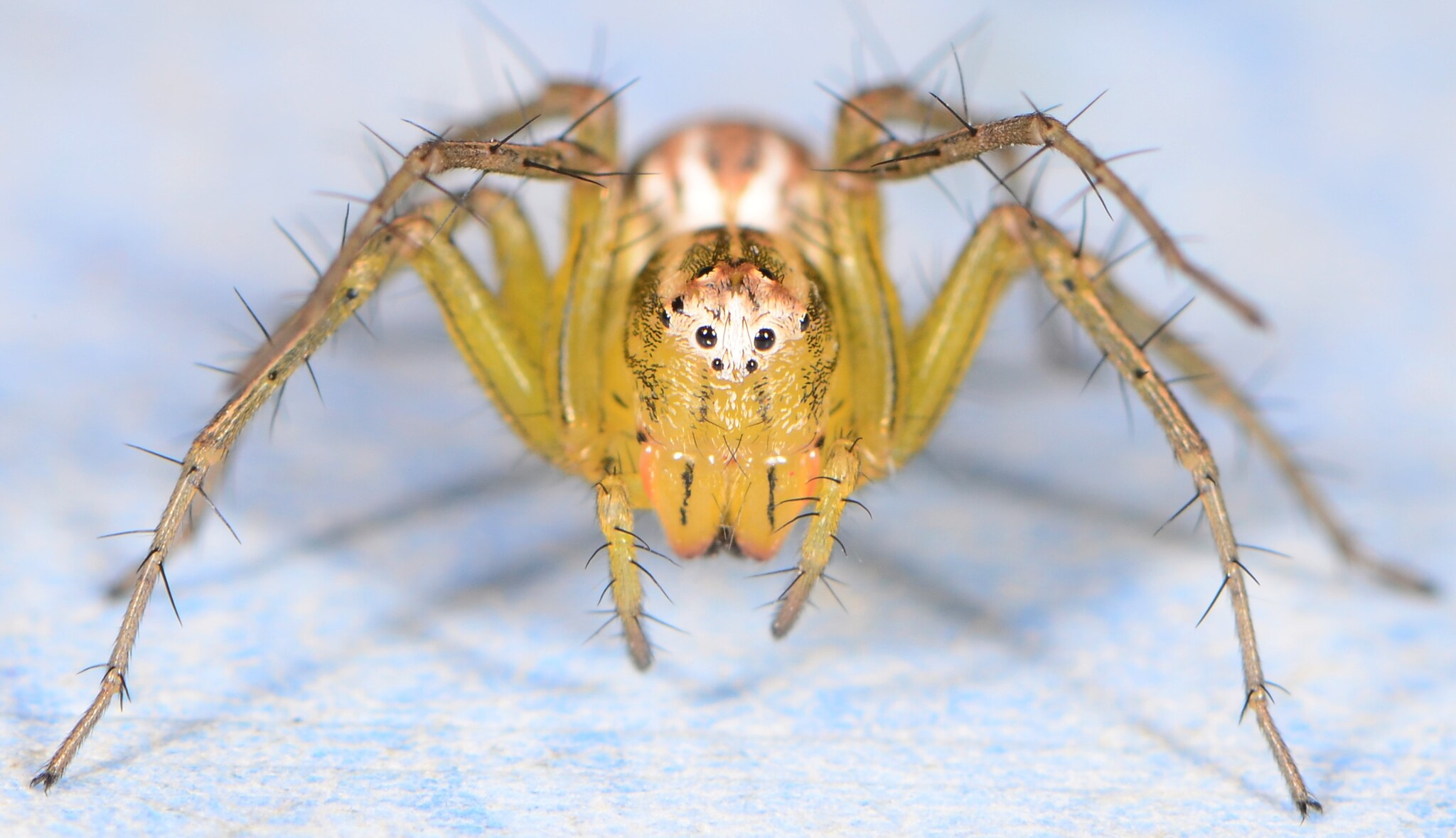
- female

Scientific classification
- Kingdom: Animalia
- Phylum: Arthropoda
- Subphylum: Chelicerata
- Class: Arachnida
- Order: Araneae
- Infraorder: Araneomorphae
- Family: Oxyopidae
- Genus: Oxyopes
- Species: O. subabebae

Binomial name
- Oxyopes subabebae Caporiacco, 1941

= Oxyopes subabebae =

Species of spider

Oxyopes subabebae is a species of spider in the family Oxyopidae. It is commonly known as a lynx spider.

== Distribution ==
Oxyopes subabebae occurs in Ethiopia and South Africa. In South Africa, the species is known only from KwaZulu-Natal.

== Habitat and ecology ==
The species has been found on grasses in the Savanna biome at 1,498 m above sea level. It appears to be under-sampled and is expected to occur in additional African countries beyond its currently known range.

== Conservation ==
Oxyopes subabebae is listed as Least Concern by the South African National Biodiversity Institute due to its wide geographic range across Africa, despite being under-collected. The large distance between collection areas suggests the species may be more widespread than current records indicate.
