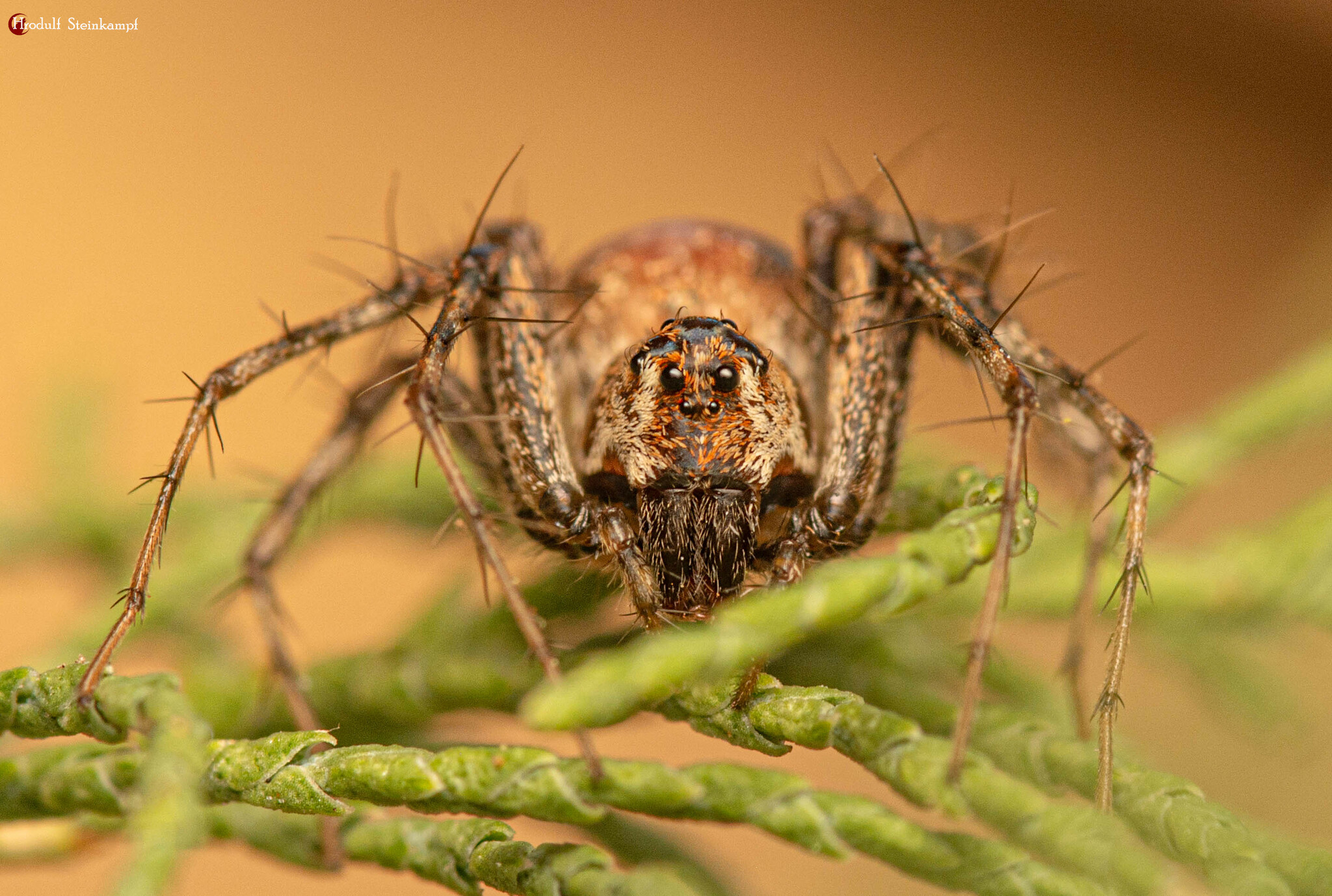

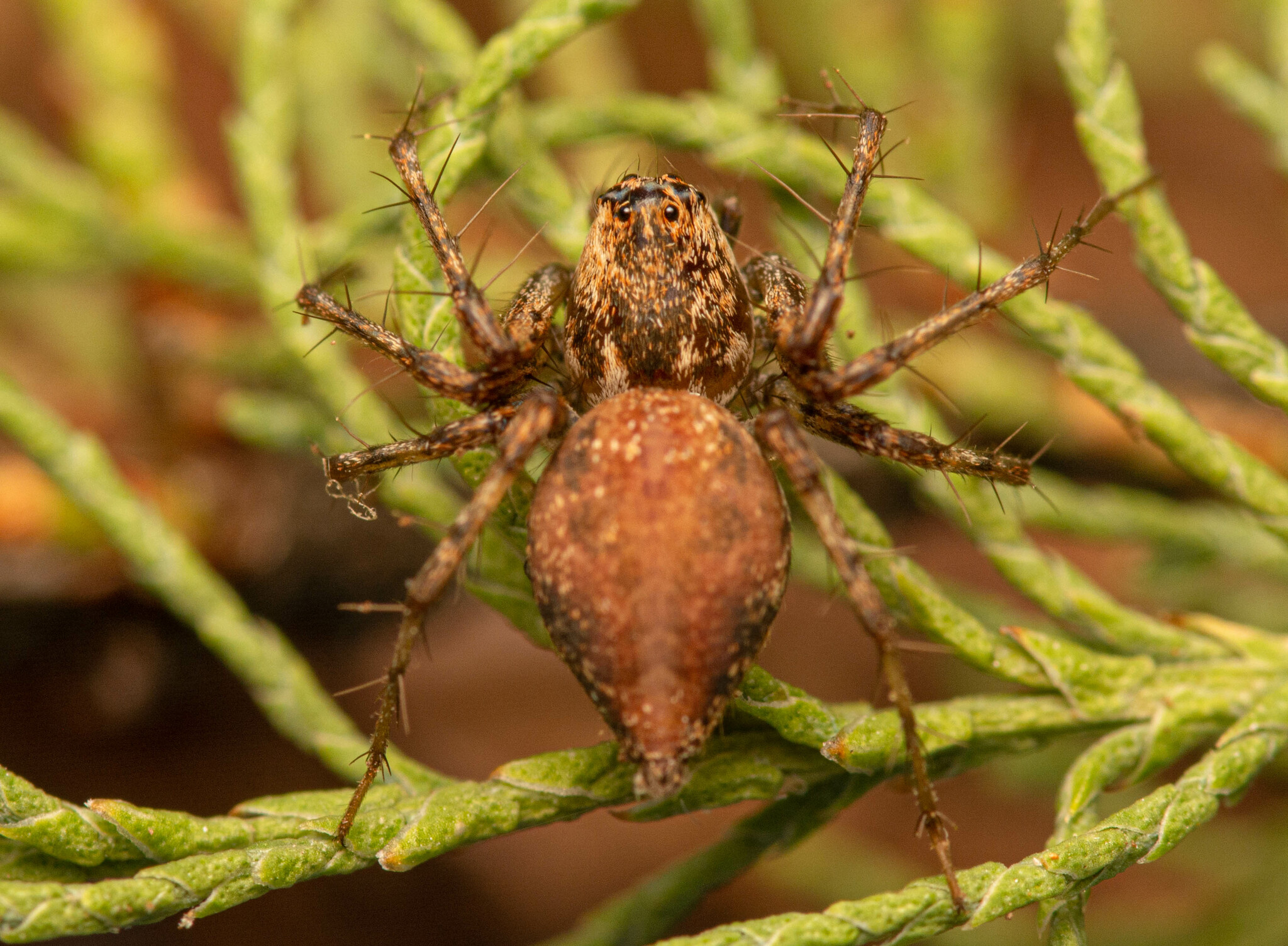

Scientific classification
- Kingdom: Animalia
- Phylum: Arthropoda
- Subphylum: Chelicerata
- Class: Arachnida
- Order: Araneae
- Infraorder: Araneomorphae
- Family: Oxyopidae
- Genus: Oxyopes
- Species: O. russoi

Binomial name
- Oxyopes russoi Caporiacco, 1940

= Oxyopes russoi =

Rusty Lynx Spider

Species of spider

Oxyopes russoi is a species of spider in the family Oxyopidae. It is commonly known as the rusty lynx spider.

== Distribution ==
Oxyopes russoi occurs in Somalia, Eswatini, and South Africa. In South Africa, the species has been recorded from five provinces at altitudes ranging from 15 to 1,334 m above sea level.

== Habitat and ecology ==
The species is commonly found on grasses across multiple biomes including Fynbos, Grassland, and Savanna biomes. It appears to be well-adapted to the grassland environments typical of these biome types.

== Description ==
Oxyopes russoi is known only from females.

== Conservation ==
Oxyopes russoi is listed as Least Concern by the South African National Biodiversity Institute despite being known only from one sex, due to its wide geographical range. The species is protected in more than ten protected areas and faces no significant threats.
