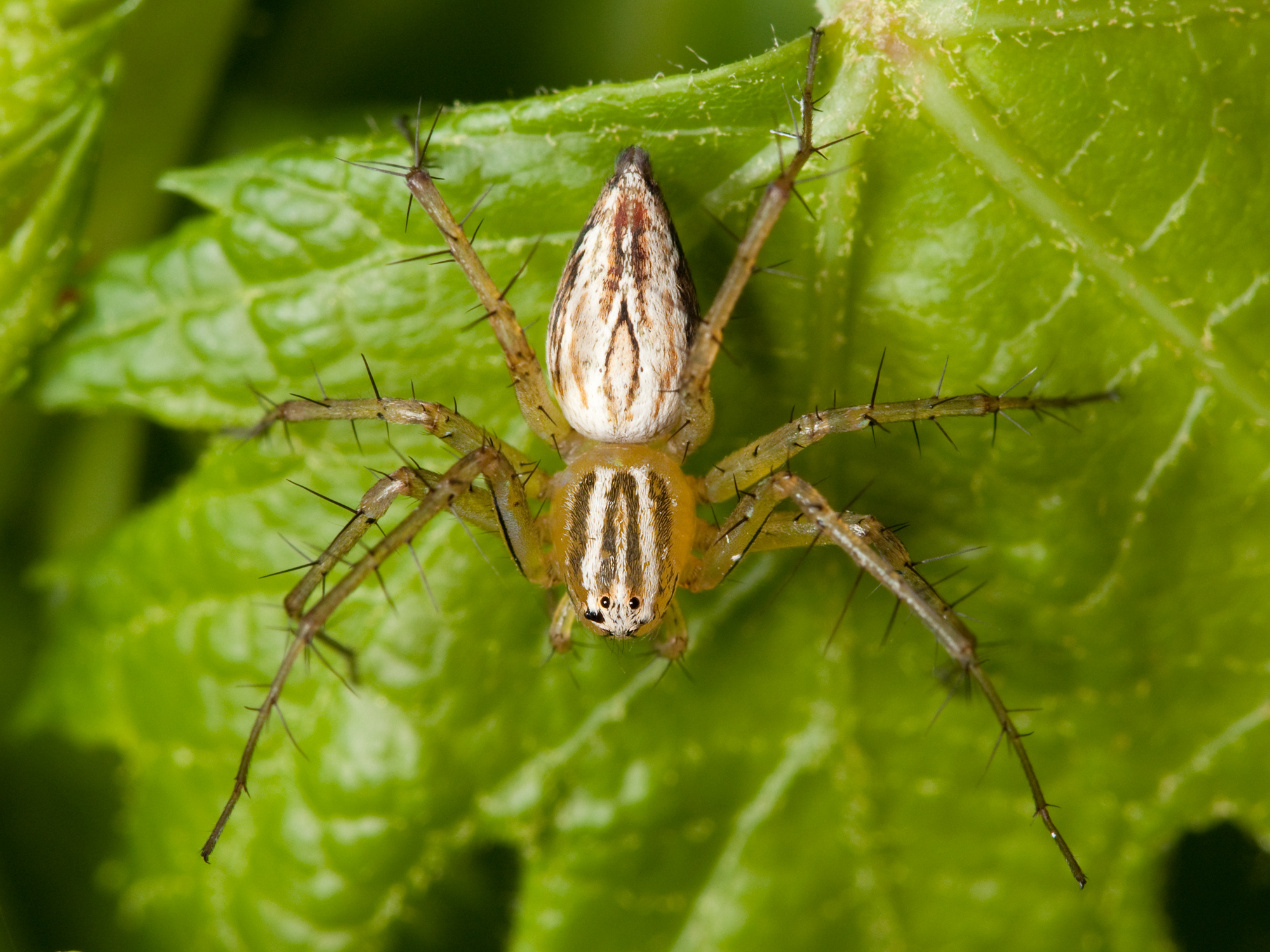
- Oxyopes salticus
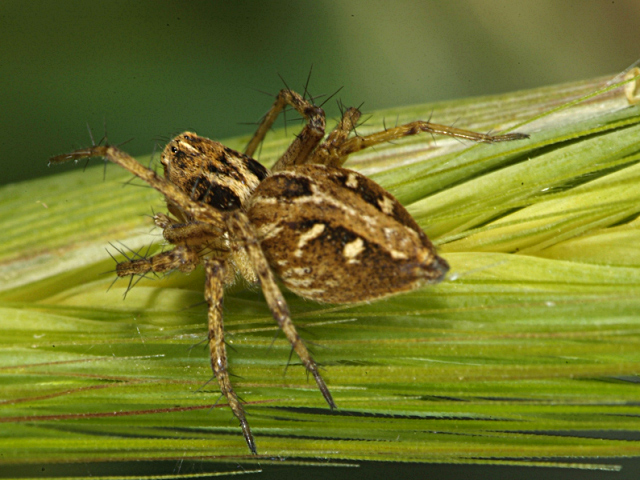
- Oxyopes heterophthalmus

Scientific classification
- Kingdom: Animalia
- Phylum: Arthropoda
- Subphylum: Chelicerata
- Class: Arachnida
- Order: Araneae
- Infraorder: Araneomorphae
- Family: Oxyopidae
- Genus: Oxyopes; Latreille, 1804

Type species
- Aranea heterophthalma Latreille, 1804a

Species
- See text

Diversity
- ~300 species

= Oxyopes =

Oxyopes Temporal range: Palaeogene–present

Genus of spiders

Oxyopes is a genus of lynx spiders found worldwide. It includes arounds 300 species and is classified under the lynx spider family Oxyopidae.

Like other lynx spiders, they are easily recognizable by the six larger eyes arranged hexagonally on top of the head (prosoma), with the remaining smaller two eyes in front. They are also characterized by long spine-like bristles (setae) on their legs. They are ambush predators, actively hunting prey by sight. Though they produce and use silk, they do not build webs to capture prey.

The genus was first established in 1804 by the French zoologist Pierre André Latreille. The generic name means "keen-eyed", from Ancient Greek ὀξύς (oxús, "sharp") and ὤψ (ṓps, "eye").

== Species ==
As of October 2025, this genus includes 279 species and five subspecies.

Species with an article on Wikipedia:

- Oxyopes acleistus Chamberlin, 1929 – United States, Mexico
- Oxyopes affinis Lessert, 1915 – DR Congo, Tanzania, Mozambique, South Africa
- Oxyopes aglossus Chamberlin, 1929 – United States
- Oxyopes apollo Brady, 1964 – United States, Mexico
- Oxyopes bedoti Lessert, 1915 – Tanzania, South Africa
- Oxyopes bonneti Lessert, 1933 – Angola, South Africa
- Oxyopes bothai Lessert, 1915 – Ethiopia, Tanzania, South Africa
- Oxyopes castaneus Lawrence, 1927 – Namibia, South Africa
- Oxyopes ceylonicus Karsch, 1892 – Sri Lanka
- Oxyopes chapini Lessert, 1927 – DR Congo, Namibia, South Africa
- Oxyopes cornifrons (Thorell, 1899) – Cameroon, Guinea-Bissau
- Oxyopes cornutus F. O. Pickard-Cambridge, 1902 – Mexico
- Oxyopes daksina Sherriffs, 1955 – Sri Lanka, China
- Oxyopes dumonti (Vinson, 1863) – Ethiopia, Zimbabwe, South Africa, Seychelles, Madagascar, Réunion, Mauritius
- Oxyopes elegans L. Koch, 1878 – Australia (New South Wales, Northern Territory?, Queensland?, Victoria?)
- Oxyopes falconeri Lessert, 1915 – Tanzania, Namibia, Botswana, Zimbabwe, South Africa
- Oxyopes flavipalpis (Lucas, 1858) – Ethiopia, Somalia, Cameroon, DR Congo, Guinea, Tanzania, Zimbabwe, South Africa, Eswatini
- Oxyopes galla Caporiacco, 1941 – Ethiopia, Namibia, South Africa
- Oxyopes gracilipes (White, 1849) – Australia (New South Wales, Queensland), New Zealand
- Oxyopes heterophthalmus (Latreille, 1804) – Europe, North Africa to Middle East, Turkey, Caucasus, Kazakhstan, China (type species)
- Oxyopes hindostanicus Pocock, 1901 – Pakistan, Maldives, India, Sri Lanka, Bangladesh
- Oxyopes hoggi Lessert, 1915 – Tanzania, Angola, Zimbabwe, South Africa
- Oxyopes jacksoni Lessert, 1915 – Tanzania, Malawi, Botswana, Zimbabwe, South Africa
- Oxyopes javanus Thorell, 1887 – India, Nepal, Bangladesh, Thailand, Indonesia (Java), Philippines, China
- Oxyopes lepidus (Blackwall, 1864) – India
- Oxyopes lineatus Latreille, 1806 – Europe, Turkey, Caucasus, Russia (Europe to Central Asia), Middle East, Central Asia, Nepal
- Oxyopes longispinosus Lawrence, 1938 – Tanzania, Botswana, South Africa
- Oxyopes macilentus L. Koch, 1878 – Pakistan, China, Japan, Taiwan, Philippines, Indonesia, Australia
- Oxyopes occidens Brady, 1964 – United States, Mexico
- Oxyopes pallidecoloratus Strand, 1906 – Ethiopia, Congo, Southern Africa, Madagascar
- Oxyopes personatus Simon, 1897 – South Africa
- Oxyopes rufisternis Pocock, 1901 – Pakistan, India, Sri Lanka
- Oxyopes russoi Caporiacco, 1940 – Somalia, South Africa, Eswatini
- Oxyopes salticus Hentz, 1845 – USA to Argentina and Chile. Introduced to St. Helena
- Oxyopes scalaris Hentz, 1845 – North America
- Oxyopes schenkeli Lessert, 1927 – DR Congo, Uganda, Botswana, Zimbabwe, South Africa
- Oxyopes sertatus L. Koch, 1878 – India, Nepal, China, Taiwan, Korea, Japan
- Oxyopes shweta Tikader, 1970 – Pakistan, India, China
- Oxyopes singularis Lessert, 1927 – DR Congo, Namibia, Zimbabwe, South Africa
- Oxyopes sjostedti Lessert, 1915 – Ethiopia, Tanzania, South Africa
- Oxyopes subabebae Caporiacco, 1941 – Ethiopia, South Africa
- Oxyopes takobius Andreeva & Tystshenko, 1969 – Iran, Kazakhstan, Central Asia, China
- Oxyopes tridens Brady, 1964 – United States, Mexico
- Oxyopes tuberculatus Lessert, 1915 – Tanzania, South Africa, Eswatini
- Oxyopes uncinatus Lessert, 1915 – Tanzania, South Africa
- Oxyopes vanderysti Lessert, 1946 – DR Congo, South Africa
- Oxyopes vogelsangeri Lessert, 1946 – DR Congo, South Africa

Complete species list as of October 2025
- Oxyopes acleistus Chamberlin, 1929 – United States, Mexico
- Oxyopes aculeatus Bösenberg & Lenz, 1895 – East Africa
- Oxyopes affinis Lessert, 1915 – DR Congo, Tanzania, Mozambique, South Africa
- Oxyopes aglossus Chamberlin, 1929 – United States
- Oxyopes albertianus Strand, 1913 – DR Congo, Uganda
- Oxyopes algerianus (Walckenaer, 1841) – Morocco, Algeria
- Oxyopes allectus Simon, 1909 – Gabon, Guinea-Bissau
- Oxyopes altifrons Mello-Leitão, 1941 – Brazil
- Oxyopes amoenus L. Koch, 1878 – Australia (Queensland, New South Wales, South Australia?, Northern Territory?)
- Oxyopes angulitarsis Lessert, 1915 – Uganda, South Africa
- Oxyopes annularis Yin, Zhang & Bao, 2003 – China
- Oxyopes annulipes Thorell, 1890 – Indonesia (Sumatra)
- Oxyopes apollo Brady, 1964 – United States, Mexico
- Oxyopes arcuatus Yin, Zhang & Bao, 2003 – China
- Oxyopes argentosus Simon, 1909 – Guinea-Bissau
- Oxyopes argyrotrichius Mello-Leitão, 1929 – Brazil
- Oxyopes armatipalpis Strand, 1912 – India
- Oxyopes artemis Brady, 1970 – United States
- Oxyopes arushae Caporiacco, 1947 – Tanzania
- Oxyopes ashae Gajbe, 1999 – India
- Oxyopes aspirasi Barrion & Litsinger, 1995 – Philippines
- Oxyopes assamensis Tikader, 1969 – India
- Oxyopes asterion Simon, 1909 – Guinea-Bissau
- Oxyopes attenuatus L. Koch, 1878 – Australia (Queensland)
- Oxyopes auratus Thorell, 1890 – Singapore, Indonesia (Sumatra)
- Oxyopes aureolus Thorell, 1899 – Cameroon
- Oxyopes auriculatus Lawrence, 1927 – Namibia
- Oxyopes azhari Butt & Beg, 2001 – Pakistan
- Oxyopes baccatus Simon, 1897 – Ethiopia
- Oxyopes badhyzicus Mikhailov & Fet, 1986 – Georgia, Israel, Iran, Kazakhstan, Turkmenistan
- Oxyopes balteiformis Yin, Zhang & Bao, 2003 – China
- Oxyopes bantaengi Merian, 1911 – Indonesia (Sulawesi)
- Oxyopes bedoti Lessert, 1915 – Tanzania, South Africa
- Oxyopes berlandorum Lessert, 1915 – Tanzania
- Oxyopes bharatae Gajbe, 1999 – Pakistan, India
- Oxyopes bicorneus Zhang & Zhu, 2005 – China
- Oxyopes bidentata Mukhtar, 2017 – Pakistan
- Oxyopes bifidus F. O. Pickard-Cambridge, 1902 – Mexico to Panama
- Oxyopes bifissus F. O. Pickard-Cambridge, 1902 – Mexico to Costa Rica
- Oxyopes biharensis Gajbe, 1999 – India
- Oxyopes birabeni Mello-Leitão, 1941 – Argentina
- Oxyopes birmanicus Thorell, 1887 – India, China to Indonesia (Sumatra)
- Oxyopes bolivianus Tullgren, 1905 – Bolivia
- Oxyopes bonneti Lessert, 1933 – Angola, South Africa
- Oxyopes boriensis Bodkhe & Vankhede, 2012 – India
- Oxyopes bothai Lessert, 1915 – Ethiopia, Tanzania, South Africa
- Oxyopes bouvieri Berland, 1922 – Ethiopia
- Oxyopes brachiatus Simon, 1909 – Equatorial Guinea (Bioko), Congo
- Oxyopes brevis Thorell, 1881 – Indonesia (Aru Is.)
- Oxyopes caboverdensis Schmidt & Krause, 1994 – Cape Verde
- Oxyopes calcaratus Schenkel, 1944 – Timor
- Oxyopes campestratus Simon, 1909 – Guinea-Bissau, Equatorial Guinea (Bioko), São Tomé and Príncipe
- Oxyopes campii Mushtaq & Qadar, 1999 – Pakistan
- Oxyopes camponis Strand, 1915 – Cameroon
- Oxyopes candidoi Garcia-Neto, 1995 – Brazil
- Oxyopes caporiaccoi Roewer, 1951 – Ethiopia
- Oxyopes carvalhoi Mello-Leitão, 1947 – Brazil
- Oxyopes castaneus Lawrence, 1927 – Namibia, South Africa
- Oxyopes ceylonicus Karsch, 1892 – Sri Lanka
- Oxyopes chapini Lessert, 1927 – DR Congo, Namibia, South Africa
- Oxyopes chenabensis Mukhtar, 2017 – Pakistan
- Oxyopes chiapas Brady, 1975 – Mexico
- Oxyopes chittrae Tikader, 1965 – India
- Oxyopes coccineoventris Lessert, 1946 – Congo
- Oxyopes cochinchinensis (Walckenaer, 1837) – Vietnam
- Oxyopes complicatus Tang & Li, 2012 – China
- Oxyopes concolor Simon, 1877 – Philippines
- Oxyopes concoloratus Roewer, 1951 – Ethiopia
- Oxyopes constrictus Keyserling, 1891 – Brazil, Guyana
- Oxyopes cornifrons (Thorell, 1899) – Cameroon, Guinea-Bissau
  - O. c. avakubensis Lessert, 1927 – Cameroon, Guinea-Bissau, DR Congo, South Africa
- Oxyopes cornutus F. O. Pickard-Cambridge, 1902 – Mexico
- Oxyopes cougar Brady, 1970 – United States
- Oxyopes crassus Schmidt & Krause, 1995 – Cape Verde
- Oxyopes crewi Bryant, 1948 – Bahamas, Cuba, Jamaica, Hispaniola, St. Kitts and Nevis
- Oxyopes daksina Sherriffs, 1955 – Sri Lanka, China
- Oxyopes delesserti Caporiacco, 1947 – Ethiopia, East Africa
- Oxyopes delmonteensis Barrion & Litsinger, 1995 – Philippines
- Oxyopes dinendrai Sen & Sureshan, 2021 – India
- Oxyopes dingo Strand, 1913 – Central Australia
- Oxyopes dubourgi Simon, 1904 – Sudan, Congo
- Oxyopes dumonti (Vinson, 1863) – Ethiopia, Zimbabwe, South Africa, Seychelles, Madagascar, Réunion, Mauritius
- Oxyopes elegans L. Koch, 1878 – Australia (New South Wales, Northern Territory?, Queensland?, Victoria?)
- Oxyopes elifaz Levy, 2007 – Israel, Jordan
- Oxyopes elongatus Biswas, Kundu, Kundu, Saha & Raychaudhuri, 1996 – India
- Oxyopes extensipes (Butler, 1876) – Mauritius (Rodriguez)
- Oxyopes fabae Dhali, Saha & Raychaudhuri, 2015 – India
- Oxyopes falcatus Zhang, Yang & Zhu, 2005 – China
- Oxyopes falconeri Lessert, 1915 – Tanzania, Namibia, Botswana, Zimbabwe, South Africa
- Oxyopes fallax Denis, 1955 – Niger
- Oxyopes felinus Brady, 1964 – United States, Mexico
- Oxyopes flavipalpis (Lucas, 1858) – Ethiopia, Somalia, Cameroon, DR Congo, Guinea, Tanzania, Zimbabwe, South Africa, Eswatini
- Oxyopes flavus Banks, 1898 – Mexico to Costa Rica
- Oxyopes fluminensis Mello-Leitão, 1929 – Brazil
- Oxyopes forcipiformis Xie & Kim, 1996 – China
- Oxyopes fujianicus Song & Zhu, 1993 – China, Taiwan
- Oxyopes galla Caporiacco, 1941 – Ethiopia, Namibia, South Africa
- Oxyopes gaofengensis J. X. Zhang, Y. Q. Zhang & Kim, 2005 – China
- Oxyopes gemellus Thorell, 1891 – Malaysia
- Oxyopes globifer Simon, 1876 – Mediterranean to Central Asia, Iraq, Iran
- Oxyopes godeffroyi Baehr, Harms, Dupérré & Raven, 2017 – Australia (Queensland)
- Oxyopes gorumaraensis Sen, Saha & Raychaudhuri, 2011 – India
- Oxyopes gossypae Mushtaq & Qadar, 1999 – Pakistan
- Oxyopes gracilipes (White, 1849) – Australia (New South Wales, Queensland), New Zealand
- Oxyopes gratus L. Koch, 1878 – Australia (Queensland, ?Victoria, ?Northern Territory,?Western Australia)
- Oxyopes gujaratensis Gajbe, 1999 – India
- Oxyopes gyirongensis Hu & Li, 1987 – India, China
- Oxyopes haryanaensis Goyal & Malik, 2020 – India
- Oxyopes hasta Lo, Cheng & Lin, 2021 – Taiwan
- Oxyopes hastifer Simon, 1909 – Guinea-Bissau
- Oxyopes hemorrhous Mello-Leitão, 1929 – Brazil
- Oxyopes heterophthalmus (Latreille, 1804) – Europe, North Africa to Middle East, Turkey, Caucasus, Kazakhstan, China (type species)
- Oxyopes hilaris Thorell, 1881 – Timor
- Oxyopes hindostanicus Pocock, 1901 – Pakistan, Maldives, India, Sri Lanka, Bangladesh
- Oxyopes hoggi Lessert, 1915 – Tanzania, Angola, Zimbabwe, South Africa
- Oxyopes holmbergi Soares & Camargo, 1948 – Brazil
- Oxyopes hotingchiehi Schenkel, 1963 – China, India
- Oxyopes hupingensis Bao & Yin, 2002 – China
- Oxyopes idoneus Simon, 1909 – Guinea-Bissau
- Oxyopes imbellis Thorell, 1890 – Malaysia
- Oxyopes incantatus Santos, 2017 – Ecuador (Galapagos)
- Oxyopes incertus Mello-Leitão, 1929 – Peru, Brazil
- Oxyopes indiculus Thorell, 1897 – Myanmar
- Oxyopes indicus (Walckenaer, 1805) – India
- Oxyopes inversus Mello-Leitão, 1949 – Brazil
- Oxyopes iranicus Esyunin, Rad & Kamoneh, 2011 – Iran
- Oxyopes jabalpurensis Gajbe & Gajbe, 1999 – India
- Oxyopes jacksoni Lessert, 1915 – Tanzania, Malawi, Botswana, Zimbabwe, South Africa
- Oxyopes javanus Thorell, 1887 – India, Nepal, Bangladesh, Thailand, Indonesia (Java), Philippines, China
- Oxyopes jianfeng Song, 1991 – China
- Oxyopes jubilans O. Pickard-Cambridge, 1885 – Pakistan, India
- Oxyopes ketani Gajbe & Gajbe, 1999 – India
- Oxyopes keyserlingi Thorell, 1881 – New Guinea
- Oxyopes kobrooricus Strand, 1911 – Indonesia (Aru Is.)
- Oxyopes kochi Thorell, 1897 – Myanmar
- Oxyopes kohaensis Bodkhe & Vankhede, 2012 – India
- Oxyopes kolkhasensis Sarkar, Bodkhe & Uniyal, 2021 – India
- Oxyopes koreanus Paik, 1969 – Korea, Japan
- Oxyopes kovacsi Caporiacco, 1947 – Ethiopia
- Oxyopes kraepelinorum Bösenberg, 1895 – Canary Islands
- Oxyopes kumarae Biswas & Roy, 2005 – India
- Oxyopes kusumae Gajbe, 1999 – India
- Oxyopes lagarus Thorell, 1895 – Myanmar
- Oxyopes lepidus (Blackwall, 1864) – India
- Oxyopes licenti Schenkel, 1953 – Russia (Middle Siberia to Far East), China, Korea, Japan
- Oxyopes linearis Sen, Dhali, Saha & Raychaudhuri, 2015 – India
- Oxyopes lineatipes (C. L. Koch, 1847) – China to Philippines, Indonesia (Sumatra, Java)
- Oxyopes lineatus Latreille, 1806 – Europe, Turkey, Caucasus, Russia (Europe to Central Asia), Middle East, Central Asia, Nepal
  - O. l. occidentalis Kulczyński, 1907 – Italy
- Oxyopes longespina Caporiacco, 1940 – Ethiopia
- Oxyopes longetibiatus Caporiacco, 1941 – Ethiopia
- Oxyopes longinquus Thorell, 1891 – India (Nicobar Is.), Myanmar, China (Hainan)
- Oxyopes longipalpis Lessert, 1946 – Congo
- Oxyopes longispinosus Lawrence, 1938 – Tanzania, Botswana, South Africa
- Oxyopes longispinus Saha & Raychaudhuri, 2003 – India
- Oxyopes lynx Brady, 1964 – United States
- Oxyopes machuensis Mukhtar, 2013 – Pakistan
- Oxyopes macilentus L. Koch, 1878 – Pakistan, China, Japan, Taiwan, Philippines, Indonesia, Australia
- Oxyopes macroscelides Mello-Leitão, 1929 – Brazil, Paraguay
- Oxyopes maripae Caporiacco, 1954 – French Guiana
- Oxyopes masculinus Caporiacco, 1954 – French Guiana
- Oxyopes mathias Strand, 1913 – Uganda
- Oxyopes matiensis Barrion & Litsinger, 1995 – Philippines
- Oxyopes mediterraneus Levy, 1999 – Portugal, Spain, Greece, Cyprus, Israel, Iran
- Oxyopes megalops Caporiacco, 1947 – East Africa
- Oxyopes minutus Biswas, Kundu, Kundu, Saha & Raychaudhuri, 1996 – India
- Oxyopes mirabilis Zhang, Yang & Zhu, 2005 – India, China
- Oxyopes modestus Simon, 1877 – Congo
- Oxyopes molarius L. Koch, 1878 – Australia (Queensland, South Australia?, New South Wales?)
- Oxyopes mundulus L. Koch, 1878 – Australia (New South Wales, Tasmania?)
- Oxyopes naliniae Gajbe, 1999 – India
- Oxyopes nanulineatus Levy, 1999 – Israel
- Oxyopes nenilini Esyunin & Tuneva, 2009 – Iran, Uzbekistan, China
- Oxyopes nigripalpis Kulczyński, 1891 – Mediterranean
- Oxyopes ningxiaensis Tang & Song, 1990 – China
- Oxyopes niveosigillatus Mello-Leitão, 1945 – Argentina
- Oxyopes obscurifrons Simon, 1909 – São Tomé and Príncipe
- Oxyopes occidens Brady, 1964 – United States, Mexico
- Oxyopes ocelot Brady, 1975 – Mexico
- Oxyopes ornatus (Blackwall, 1868) – Tropical Africa
- Oxyopes oryzae Mushtaq & Qadar, 1999 – Pakistan
- Oxyopes pallidecoloratus Strand, 1906 – Ethiopia, Congo, Southern Africa, Madagascar
  - O. p. nigricans Caporiacco, 1947 – East Africa
- Oxyopes pallidus (C. L. Koch, 1838) – Caribbean
- Oxyopes palliventer Strand, 1911 – Indonesia (Aru Is.)
- Oxyopes pandae Tikader, 1969 – India, Bangladesh
- Oxyopes panther Brady, 1975 – United States, Mexico
- Oxyopes papuanus Thorell, 1881 – New Guinea, Solomon Islands, Australia (Queensland)
- Oxyopes pardus Brady, 1964 – United States
- Oxyopes patalongensis Simon, 1901 – Thailand
- Oxyopes pawani Gajbe, 1992 – India
- Oxyopes peetham Amulya, Sebastian & Sudhikumar, 2022 – India
- Oxyopes pennatus Schenkel, 1936 – China
- Oxyopes personatus Simon, 1897 – South Africa
- Oxyopes pigmentatus Simon, 1890 – Israel, Yemen
- Oxyopes pingasus Barrion & Litsinger, 1995 – Philippines
- Oxyopes positivus Roewer, 1961 – Senegal
- Oxyopes praedictus O. Pickard-Cambridge, 1885 – Pakistan, India
- Oxyopes providens Thorell, 1890 – Indonesia (Sumatra)
- Oxyopes pugilator Mello-Leitão, 1929 – Brazil
- Oxyopes pulchellus (Lucas, 1858) – Gabon
- Oxyopes punctatus L. Koch, 1878 – Australia (Queensland)
- Oxyopes purpurissatus Simon, 1909 – Congo
- Oxyopes quadridentatus Thorell, 1895 – Myanmar
- Oxyopes quadrifasciatus L. Koch, 1878 – Australia (Queensland)
- Oxyopes rajai Saha & Raychaudhuri, 2003 – India
- Oxyopes ramosus (Martini & Goeze, 1778) – Europe, Turkey, Caucasus, Russia (Europe to South Siberia), Kazakhstan, Korea
- Oxyopes raviensis Dyal, 1935 – Pakistan
- Oxyopes reddyi Majumder, 2004 – India
- Oxyopes reimoseri Caporiacco, 1947 – East Africa
- Oxyopes rejectus O. Pickard-Cambridge, 1885 – Pakistan, India
- Oxyopes rouxi Strand, 1911 – Indonesia (Aru Is.)
- Oxyopes royi Roewer, 1961 – Senegal
- Oxyopes rubicundus L. Koch, 1878 – Australia (New South Wales)
- Oxyopes rubriventer Caporiacco, 1941 – East Africa
  - O. r. paecilus Caporiacco, 1941 – Ethiopia
- Oxyopes rubrosignatus Keyserling, 1891 – Brazil
- Oxyopes rufisternis Pocock, 1901 – Pakistan, India, Sri Lanka
- Oxyopes rufovittatus Simon, 1886 – Senegal
- Oxyopes russoi Caporiacco, 1940 – Somalia, South Africa, Eswatini
- Oxyopes russulus Thorell, 1895 – Myanmar
- Oxyopes rutilius Simon, 1890 – Yemen (mainland, Socotra)
- Oxyopes ruwenzoricus Strand, 1913 – Uganda
- Oxyopes ryvesi Pocock, 1901 – Pakistan, India
- Oxyopes saganus Bösenberg & Strand, 1906 – Japan
- Oxyopes sakuntalae Tikader, 1970 – India
- Oxyopes salticus Hentz, 1845 – USA to Argentina and Chile. Introduced to St. Helena
- Oxyopes saradae Biswas & Roy, 2005 – India
- Oxyopes sataricus Kulkarni & Deshpande, 2012 – India
- Oxyopes scalaris Hentz, 1845 – North America
- Oxyopes scapeus Sen & Sureshan, 2021 – India
- Oxyopes schenkeli Lessert, 1927 – DR Congo, Uganda, Botswana, Zimbabwe, South Africa
- Oxyopes sectus Mello-Leitão, 1929 – Brazil
- Oxyopes septumatus Mukhtar, 2013 – Pakistan
- Oxyopes sertatoides Xie & Kim, 1996 – China
- Oxyopes sertatus L. Koch, 1878 – India, Nepal, China, Taiwan, Korea, Japan
- Oxyopes setipes Thorell, 1890 – Borneo
- Oxyopes sexmaculatus Mello-Leitão, 1929 – Peru, Brazil
- Oxyopes shakilae Mukhtar, 2013 – Pakistan
- Oxyopes shorkotensis Mukhtar, 2013 – Pakistan
- Oxyopes shweta Tikader, 1970 – Pakistan, India, China
- Oxyopes sinaiticus Levy, 1999 – Egypt
- Oxyopes singularis Lessert, 1927 – DR Congo, Namibia, Zimbabwe, South Africa
- Oxyopes sitae Tikader, 1970 – India (mainland, Andaman Is.), Bangladesh
- Oxyopes sjostedti Lessert, 1915 – Ethiopia, Tanzania, South Africa
- Oxyopes sobrinus O. Pickard-Cambridge, 1872 – Spain, Libya, Cyprus, Israel, United Arab Emirates, Iran
- Oxyopes squamosus Simon, 1886 – Senegal
- Oxyopes stephanurus Mello-Leitão, 1929 – Brazil
- Oxyopes strandi Caporiacco, 1939 – Ethiopia
- Oxyopes striagatus Song, 1991 – China, Taiwan
- Oxyopes striatus (Doleschall, 1857) – Myanmar to New Guinea
- Oxyopes subabebae Caporiacco, 1941 – Ethiopia, South Africa
- Oxyopes subimali Biswas, Kundu, Kundu, Saha & Raychaudhuri, 1996 – India
- Oxyopes submirabilis Tang & Li, 2012 – China
- Oxyopes summus Brady, 1975 – Costa Rica, Panama
- Oxyopes sunandae Tikader, 1970 – India, Bangladesh
- Oxyopes sushilae Tikader, 1965 – India, China, Taiwan
- Oxyopes taeniatulus Roewer, 1955 – Brazil
- Oxyopes taeniatus Thorell, 1877 – Indonesia (Sumatra, Java, Sulawesi)
- Oxyopes taiwanensis Lo, Cheng & Lin, 2021 – Taiwan
- Oxyopes takobius Andreeva & Tystshenko, 1969 – Iran, Kazakhstan, Central Asia, China
- Oxyopes tapponiformis Strand, 1911 – Indonesia (Moluccas), New Guinea
- Oxyopes tenellus Song, 1991 – China
- Oxyopes thumboormuzhiensis Amulya, Honey & Sudhikumar, 2022 – India
- Oxyopes tibialis F. O. Pickard-Cambridge, 1902 – Mexico, Guatemala, El Salvador, Nicaragua
- Oxyopes tiengianensis Barrion & Litsinger, 1995 – Vietnam
- Oxyopes tikaderi Biswas & Majumder, 1995 – India
- Oxyopes timorensis Schenkel, 1944 – Timor
- Oxyopes timorianus (Walckenaer, 1837) – Timor
- Oxyopes toschii Caporiacco, 1949 – Kenya
- Oxyopes travancoricola Strand, 1912 – India
- Oxyopes tridens Brady, 1964 – United States, Mexico
- Oxyopes tuberculatus Lessert, 1915 – Tanzania, South Africa, Eswatini
  - O. t. mombensis Lessert, 1915 – Tanzania
- Oxyopes ubensis Strand, 1906 – Ethiopia
- Oxyopes uncinatus Lessert, 1915 – Tanzania, South Africa
- Oxyopes vanderysti Lessert, 1946 – DR Congo, South Africa
- Oxyopes variabilis L. Koch, 1878 – Australia (Queensland, Western Australia?, South Australia?, New South Wales?)
- Oxyopes versicolor Thorell, 1887 – Myanmar
- Oxyopes vogelsangeri Lessert, 1946 – DR Congo, South Africa
- Oxyopes wokamanus Strand, 1911 – Indonesia (Aru Is.)
- Oxyopes wroughtoni Pocock, 1901 – Pakistan, India
- Oxyopes xinjiangensis Hu & Wu, 1989 – Kazakhstan, China
- Oxyopes zavattarii Caporiacco, 1939 – Ethiopia

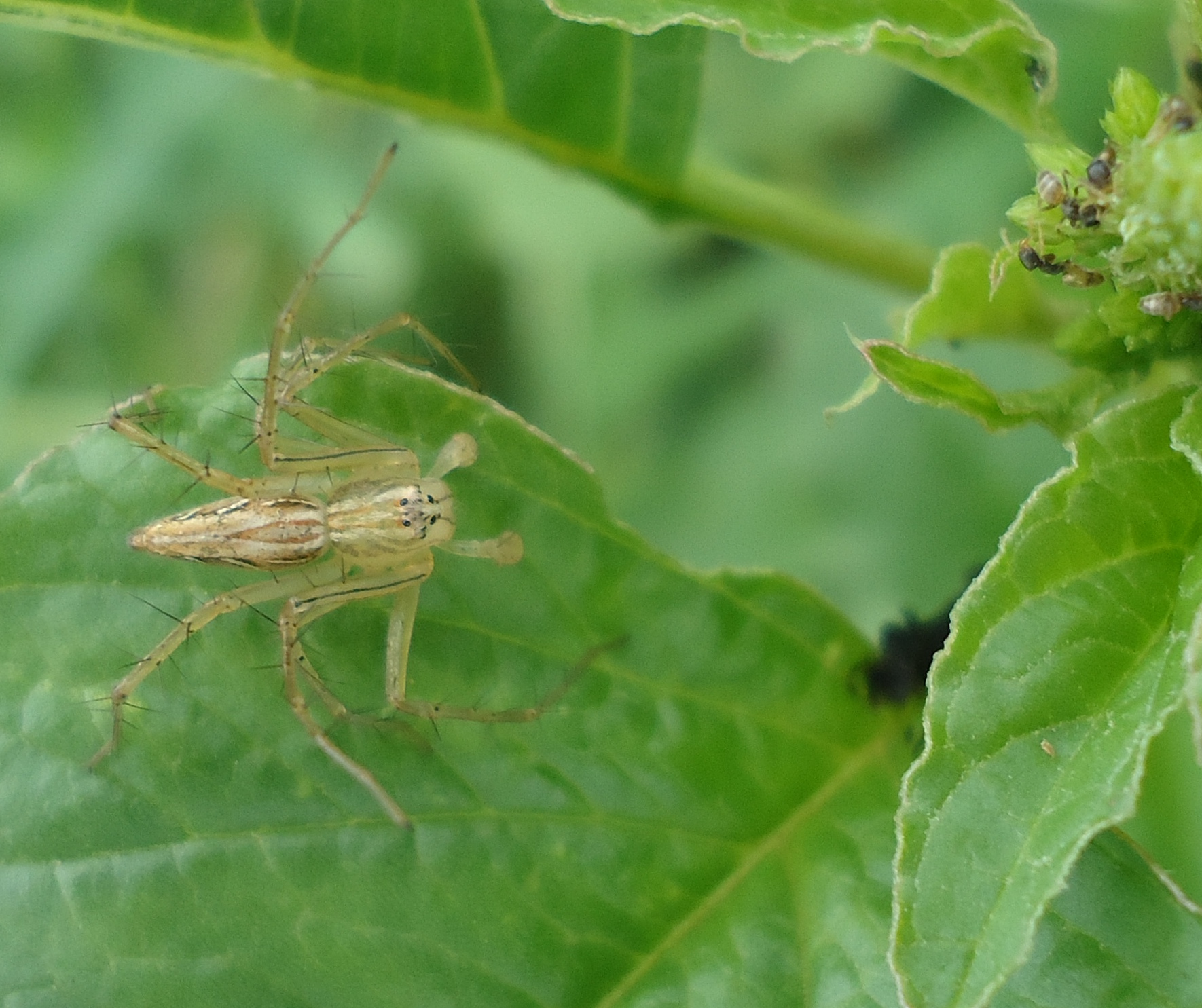
Oxyopes aspirasi

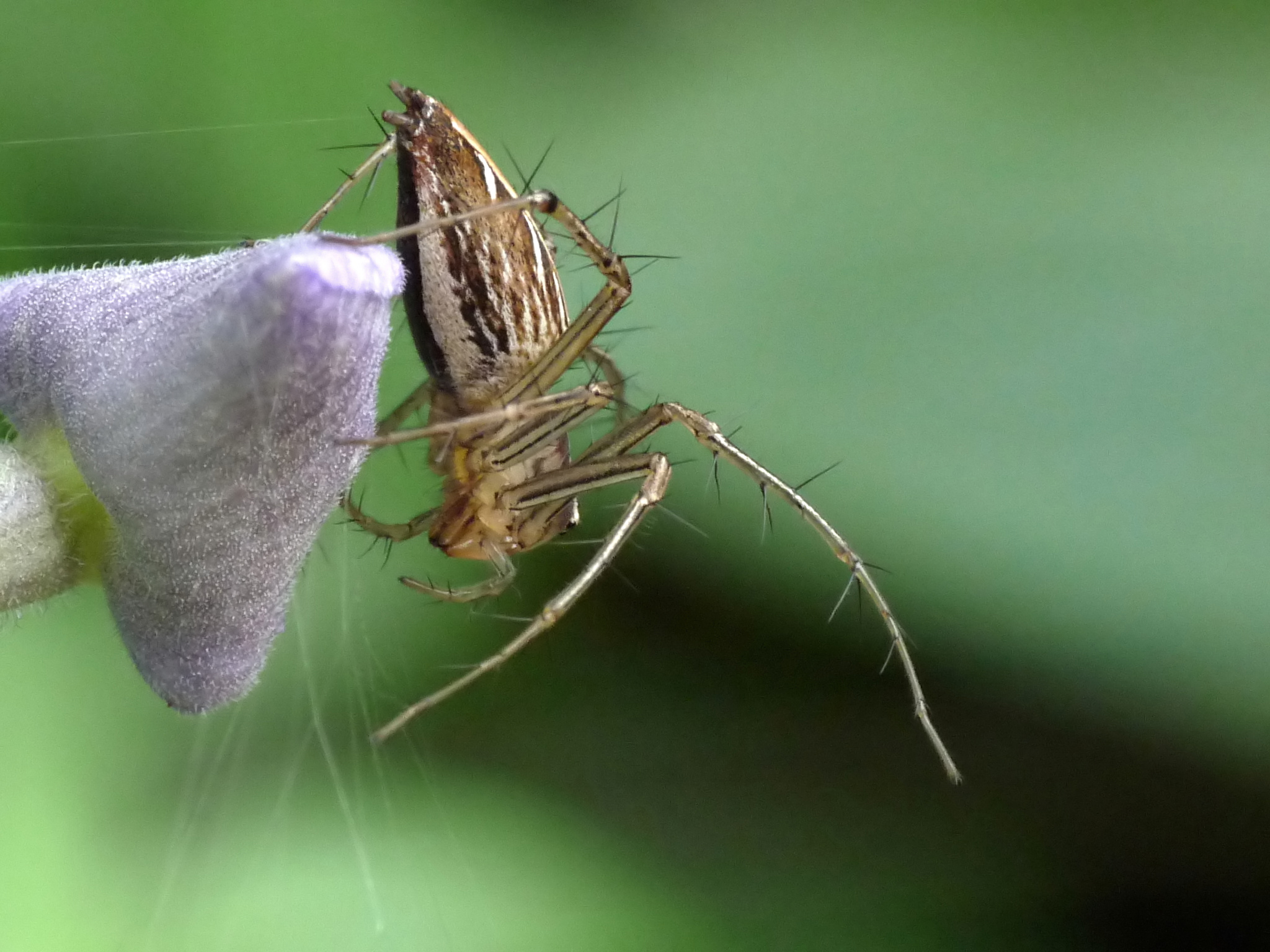
Oxyopes birmanicus

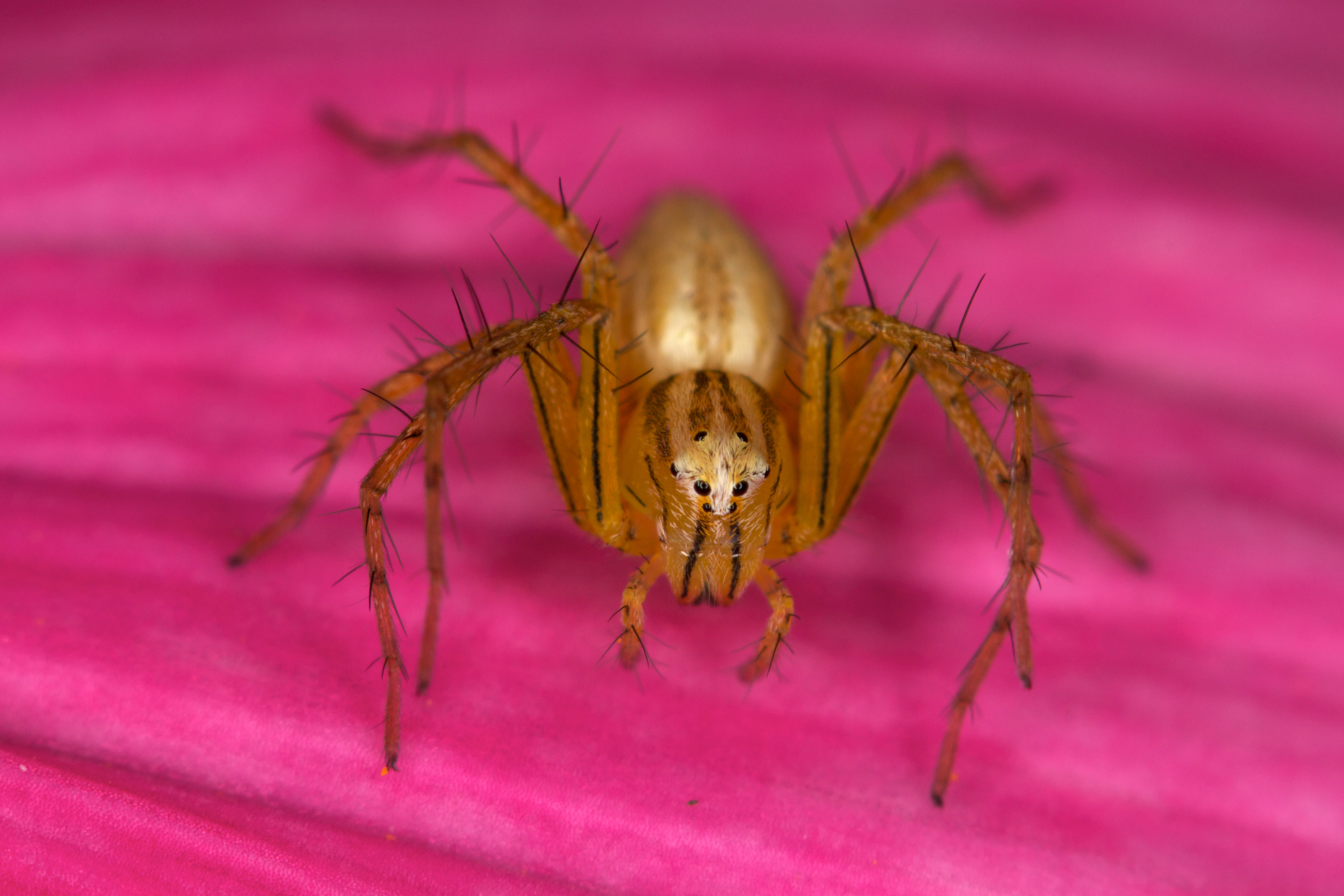
Oxyopes elegans

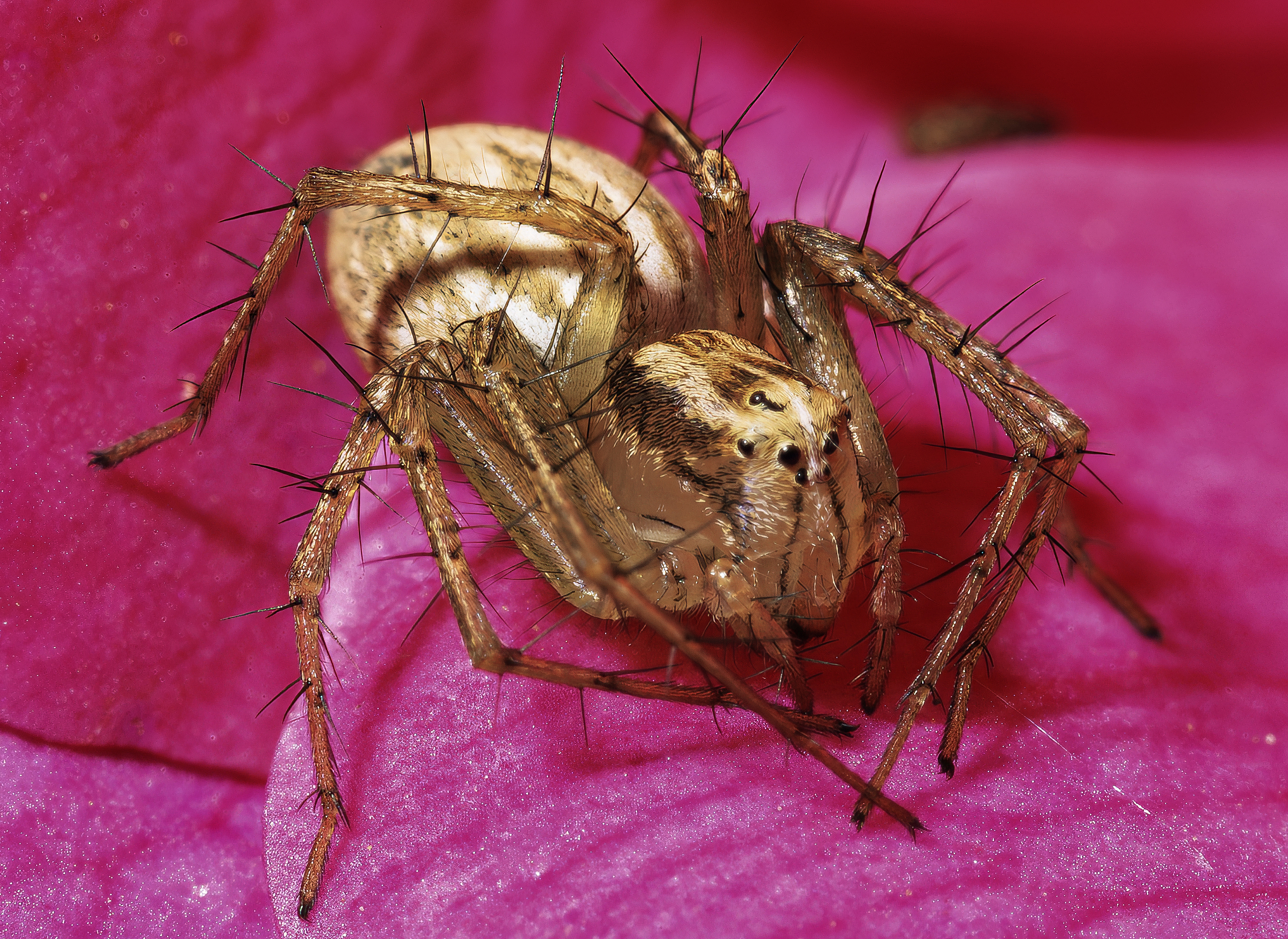
Oxyopes gracilipes

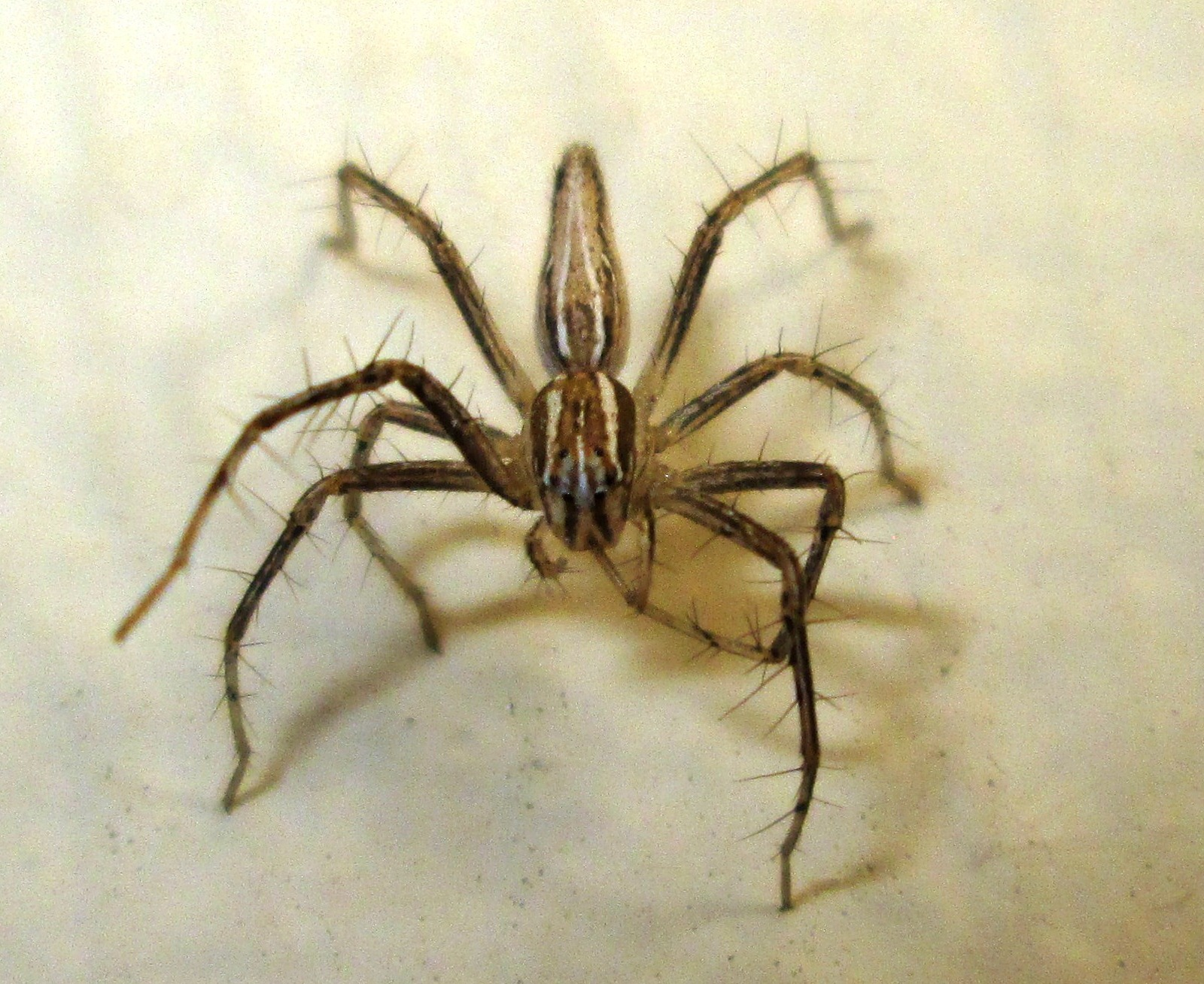
Oxyopes jacksoni

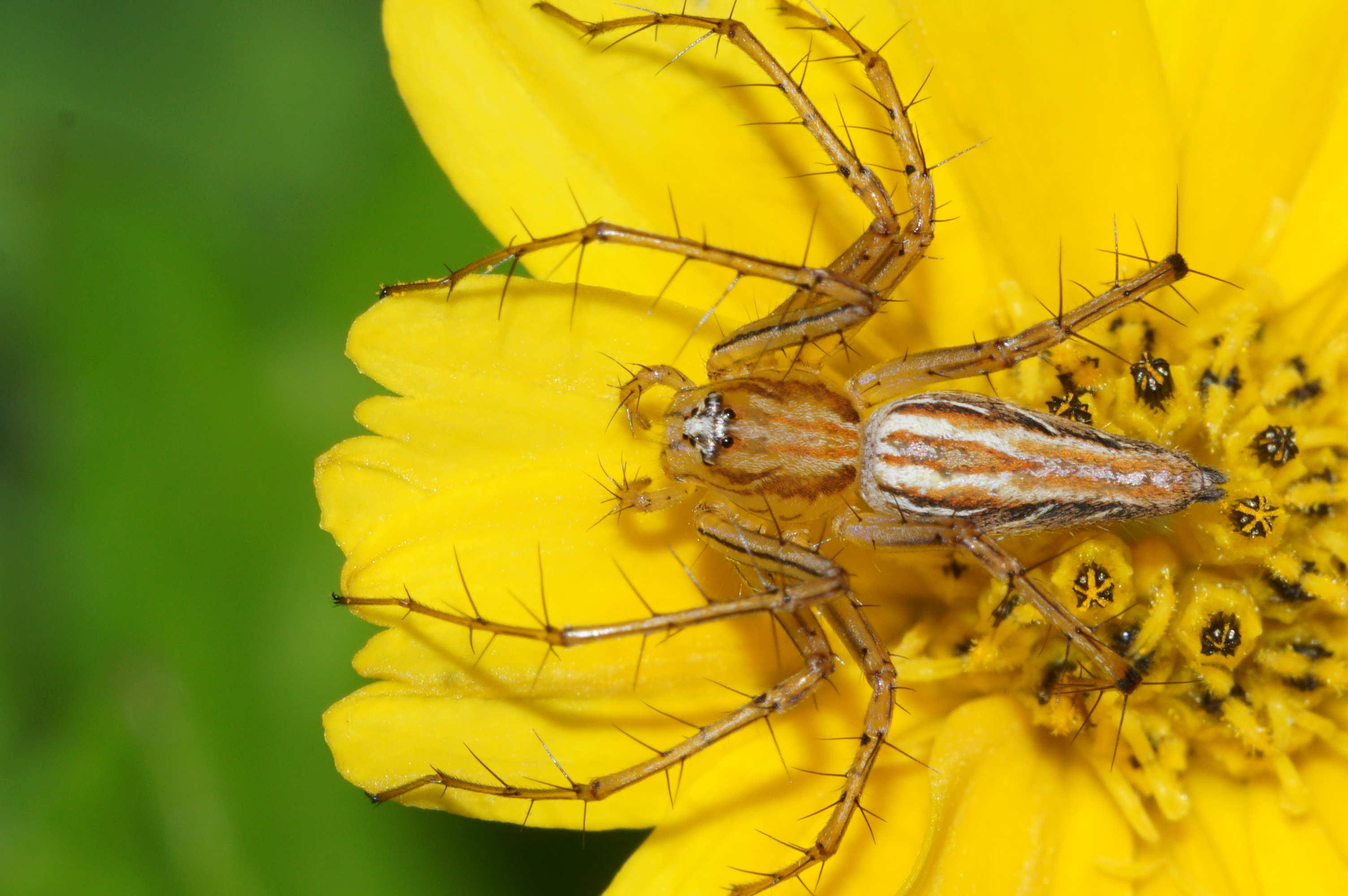
Oxyopes javanus

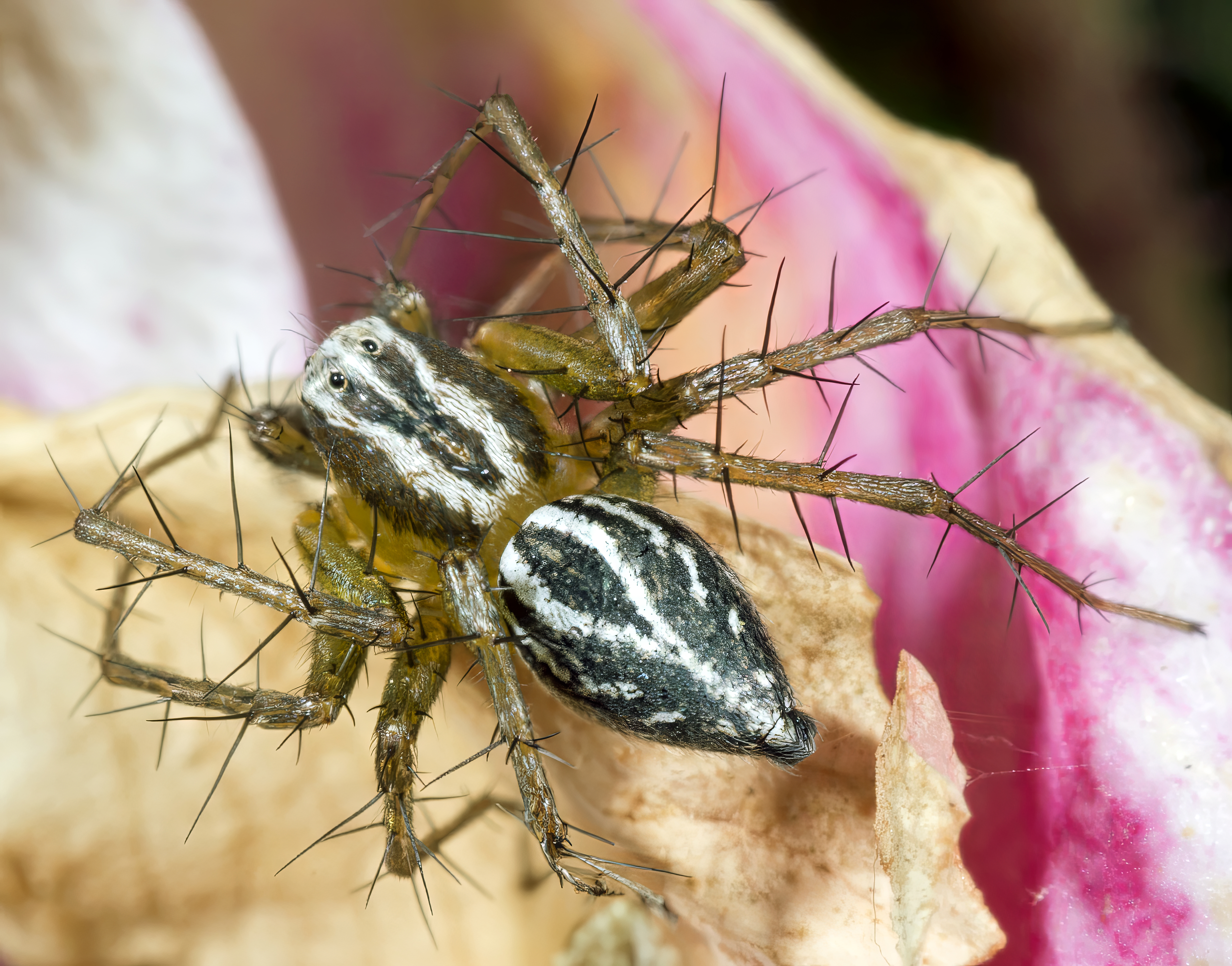
Oxyopes lineatus

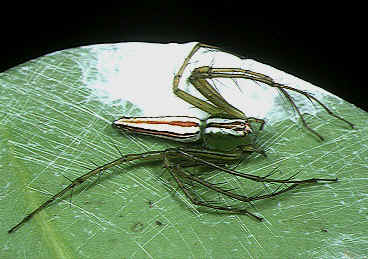
Oxyopes macilentus

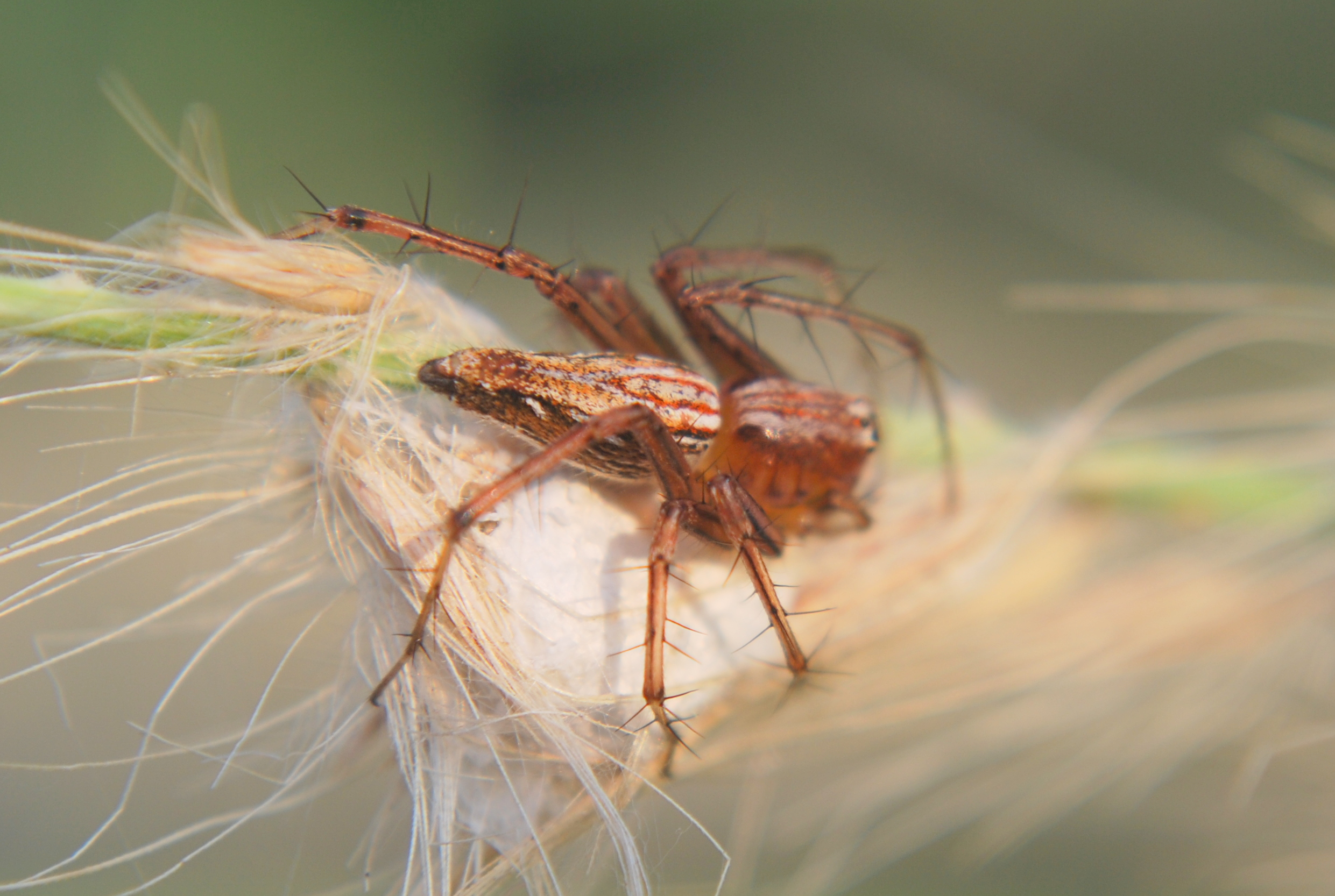
Oxyopes quadrifasciatus

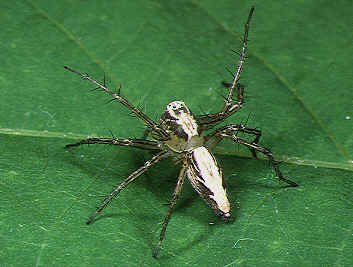
Oxyopes sertatus

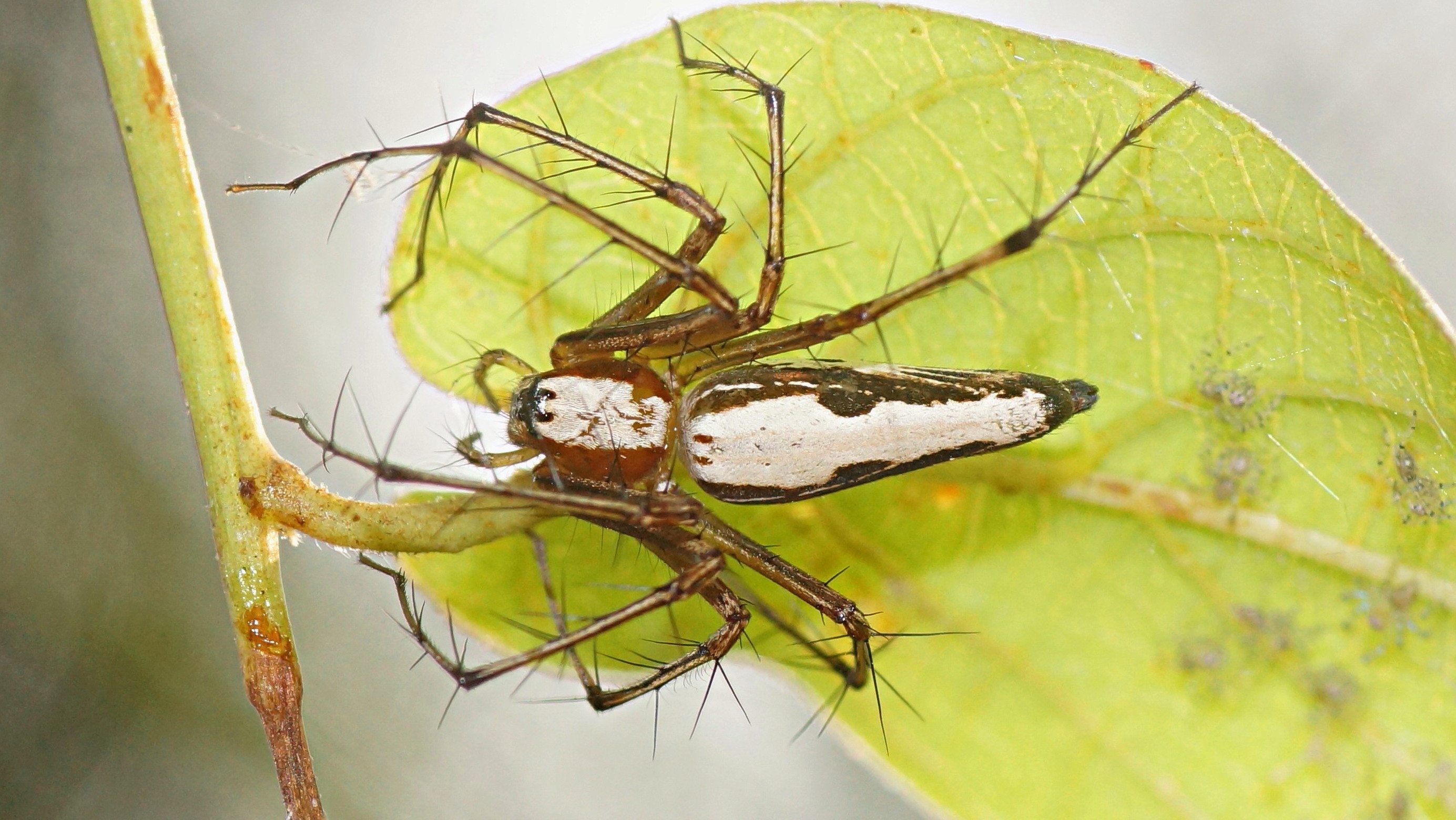
Oxyopes shweta

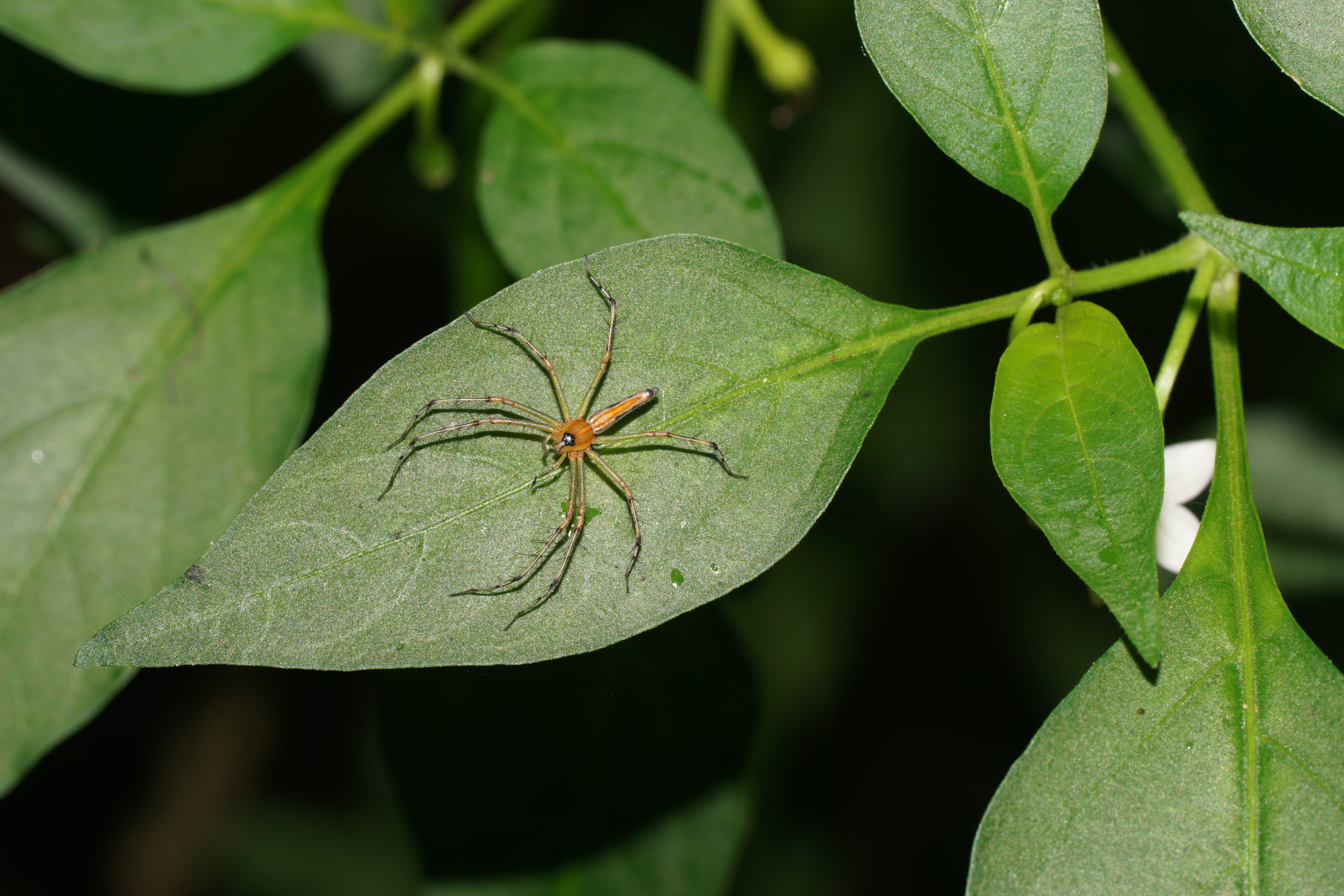
Oxyopes sunandae

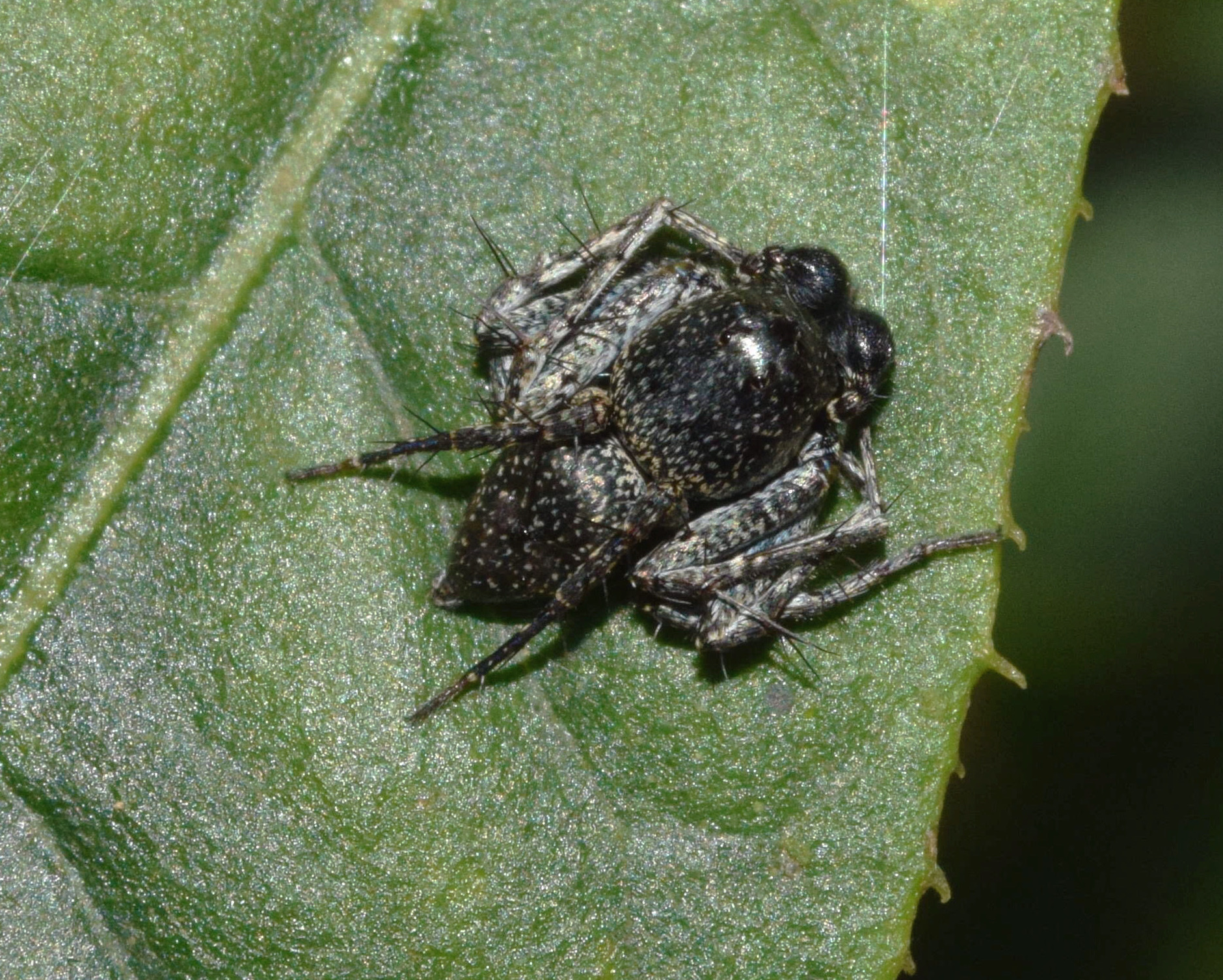
Oxyopes tuberculatus

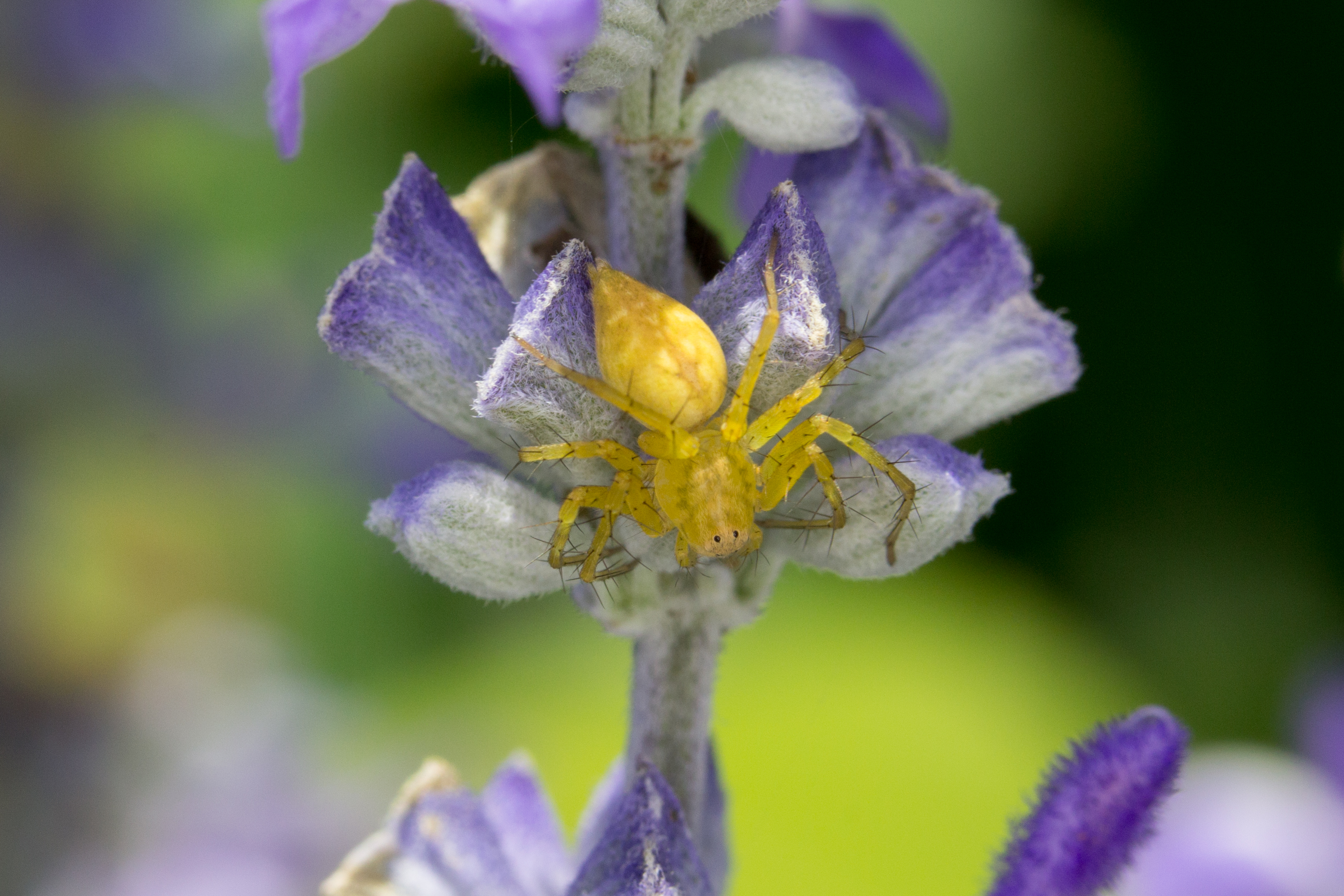
Oxyopes variabilis

== See also ==
- Peucetia
