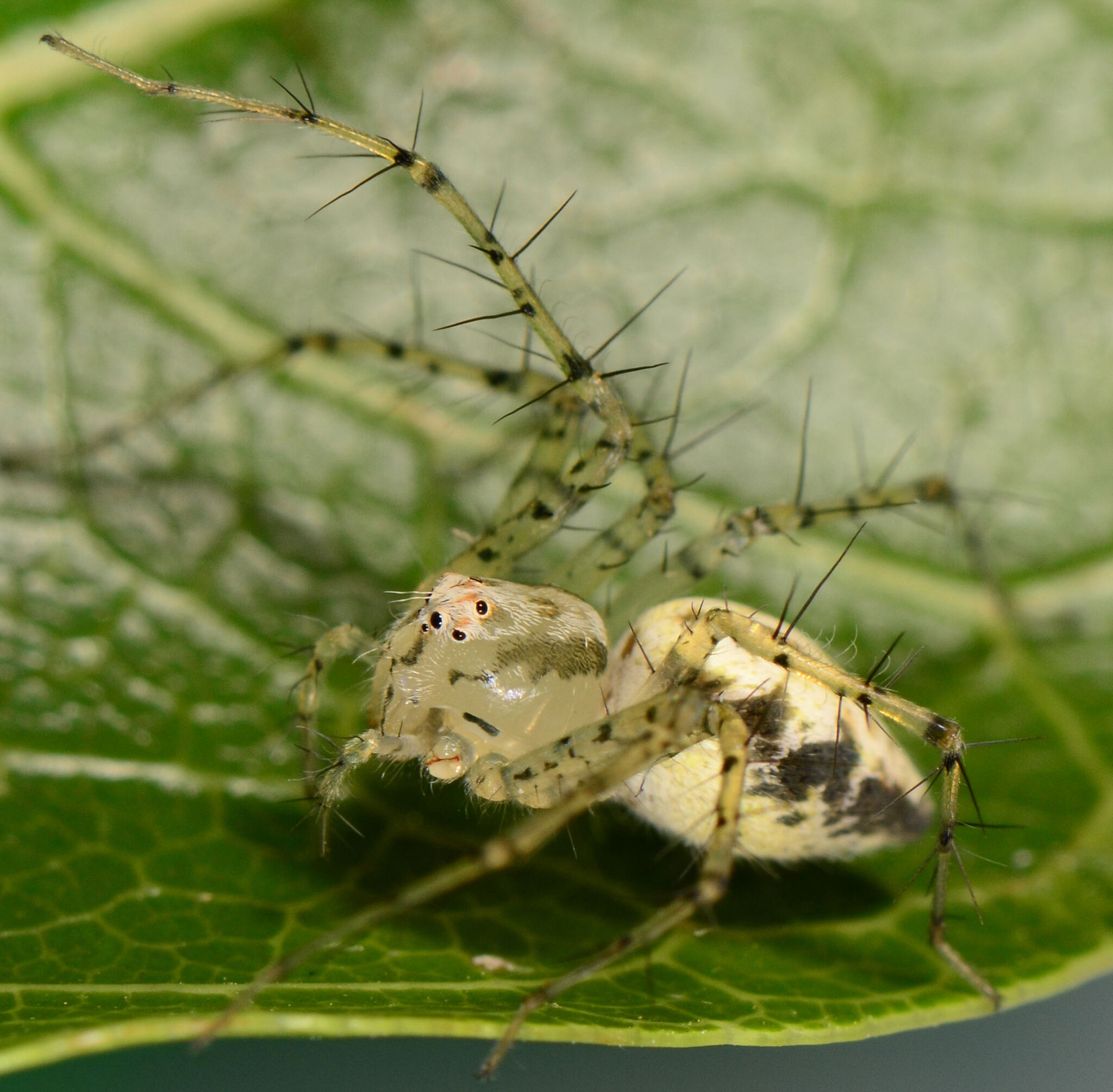
- female
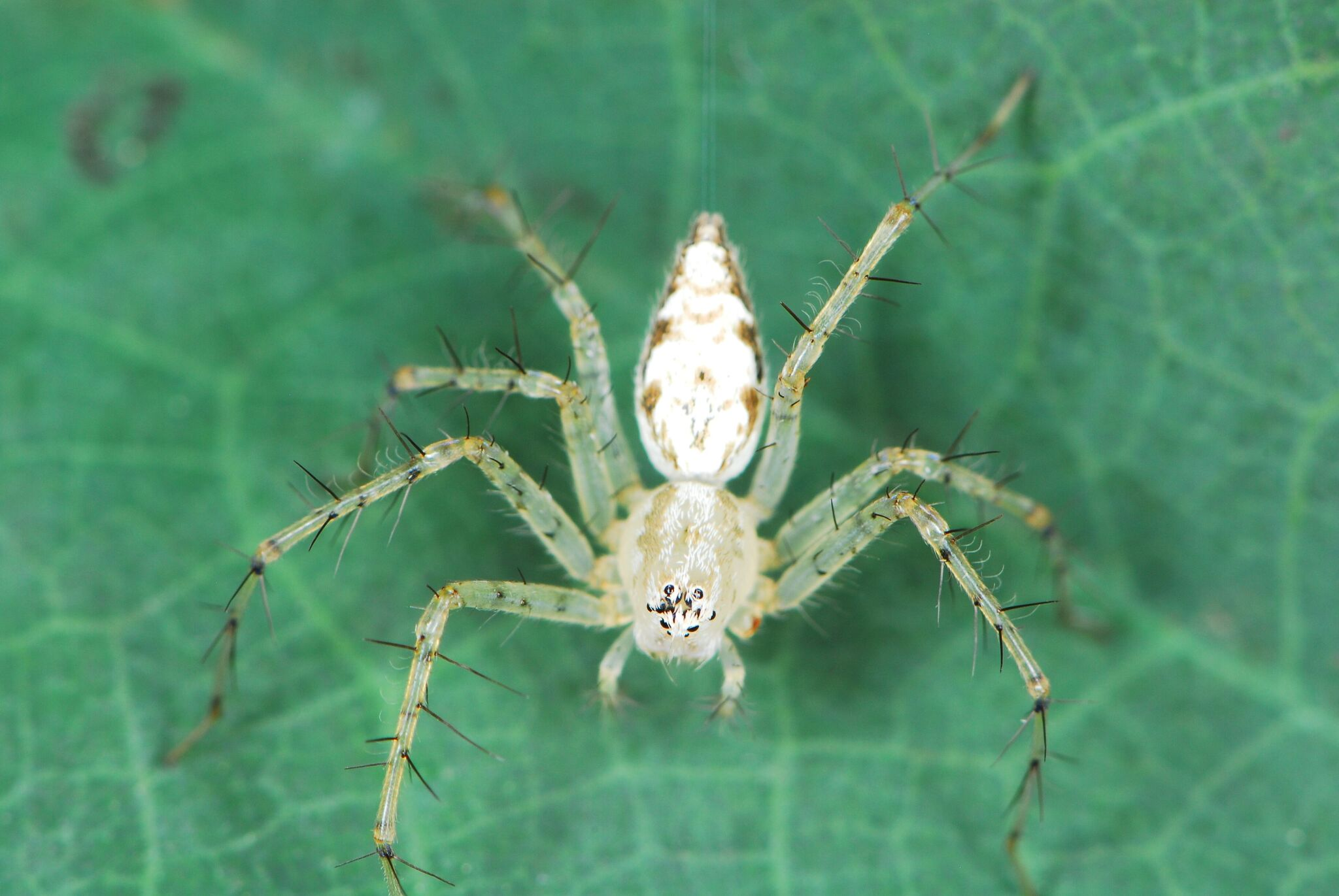
- juvenile female

Scientific classification
- Kingdom: Animalia
- Phylum: Arthropoda
- Subphylum: Chelicerata
- Class: Arachnida
- Order: Araneae
- Infraorder: Araneomorphae
- Family: Oxyopidae
- Genus: Oxyopes
- Species: O. longispinosus

Binomial name
- Oxyopes longispinosus Lawrence, 1938

= Oxyopes longispinosus =

Long Spine Lynx Spider

Species of spider

Oxyopes longispinosus is a species of spider in the family Oxyopidae. It is commonly known as the long spine lynx spider.

== Distribution ==
Oxyopes longispinosus occurs in Tanzania, Botswana, and South Africa. In South Africa, the species has been recorded from seven provinces at altitudes ranging from 7 to 1,556 m above sea level.

== Habitat and ecology ==
The species is commonly found in grassy areas across multiple biomes including Fynbos, Forest, Grassland, Savanna, and Thicket biomes. It has also been sampled from macadamia orchards, indicating its presence in agricultural landscapes.

== Description ==
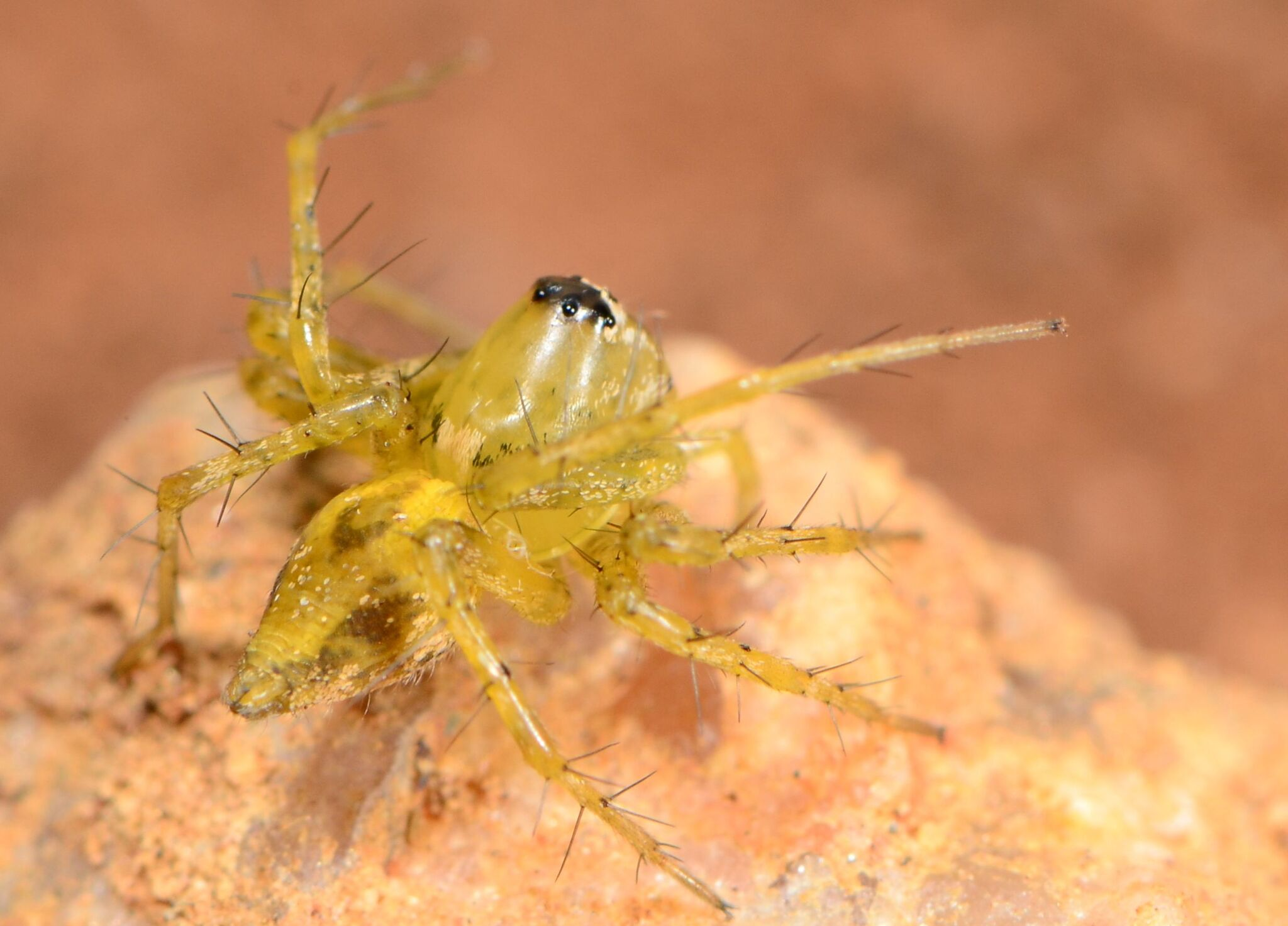
female

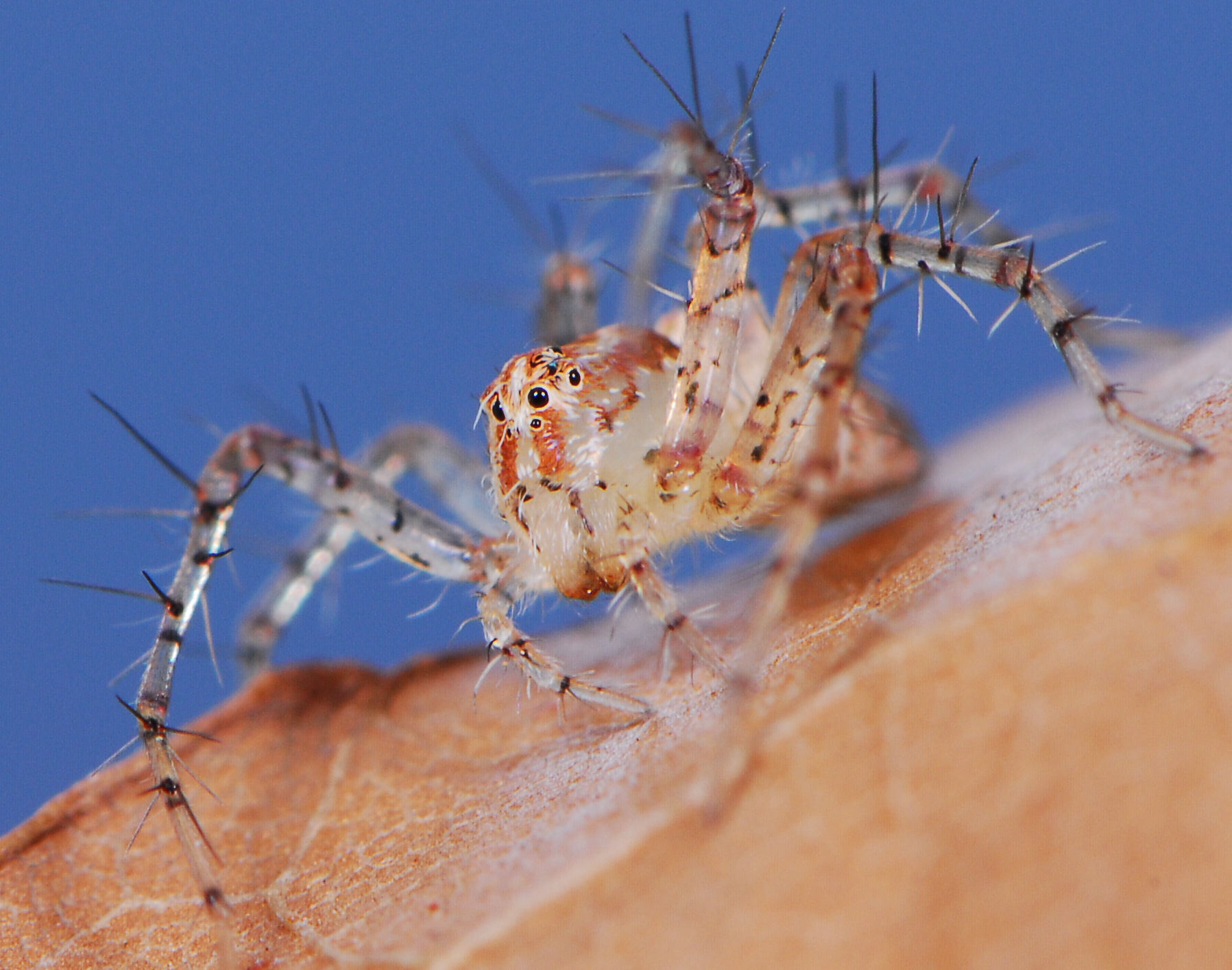
female

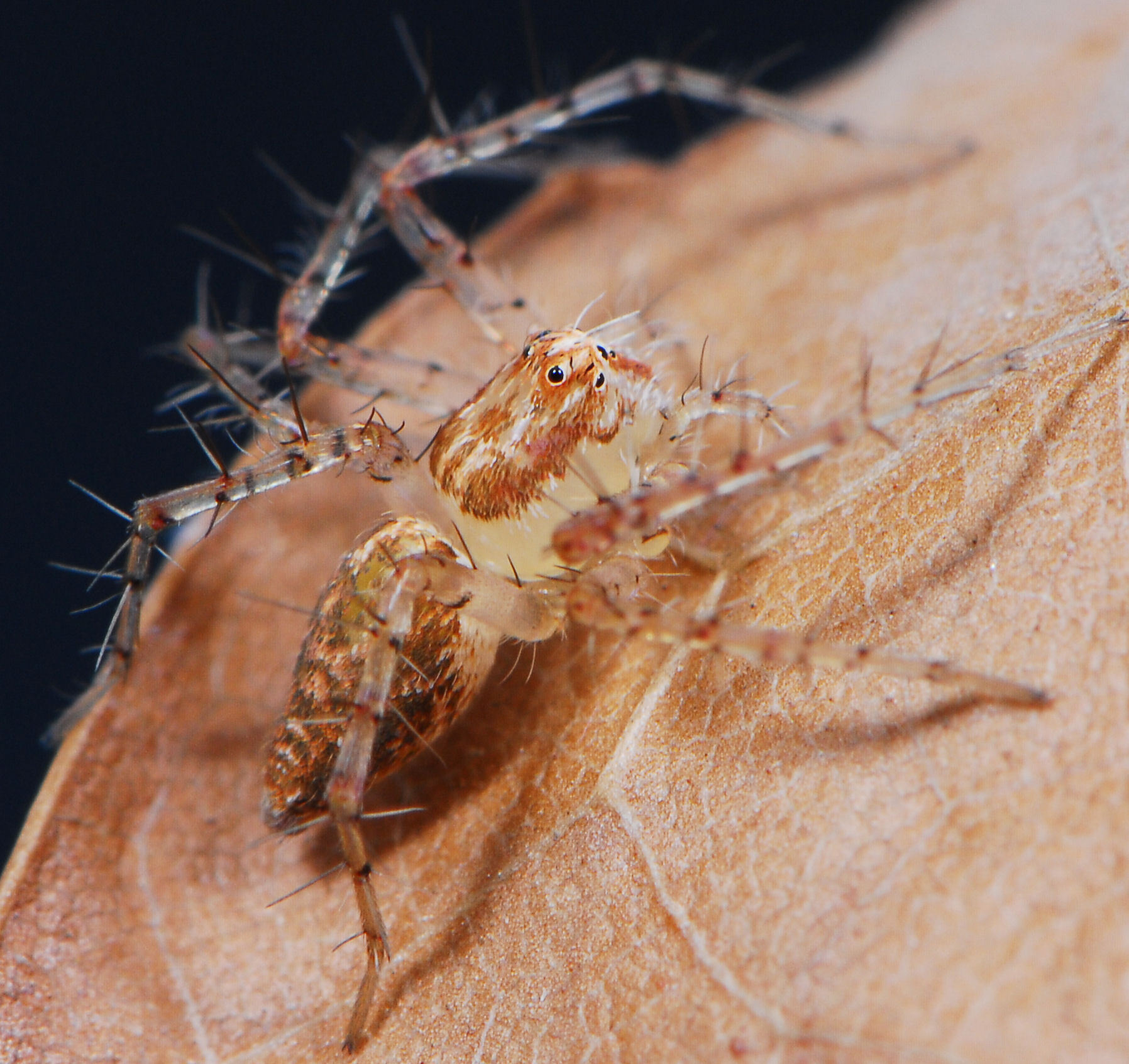
female

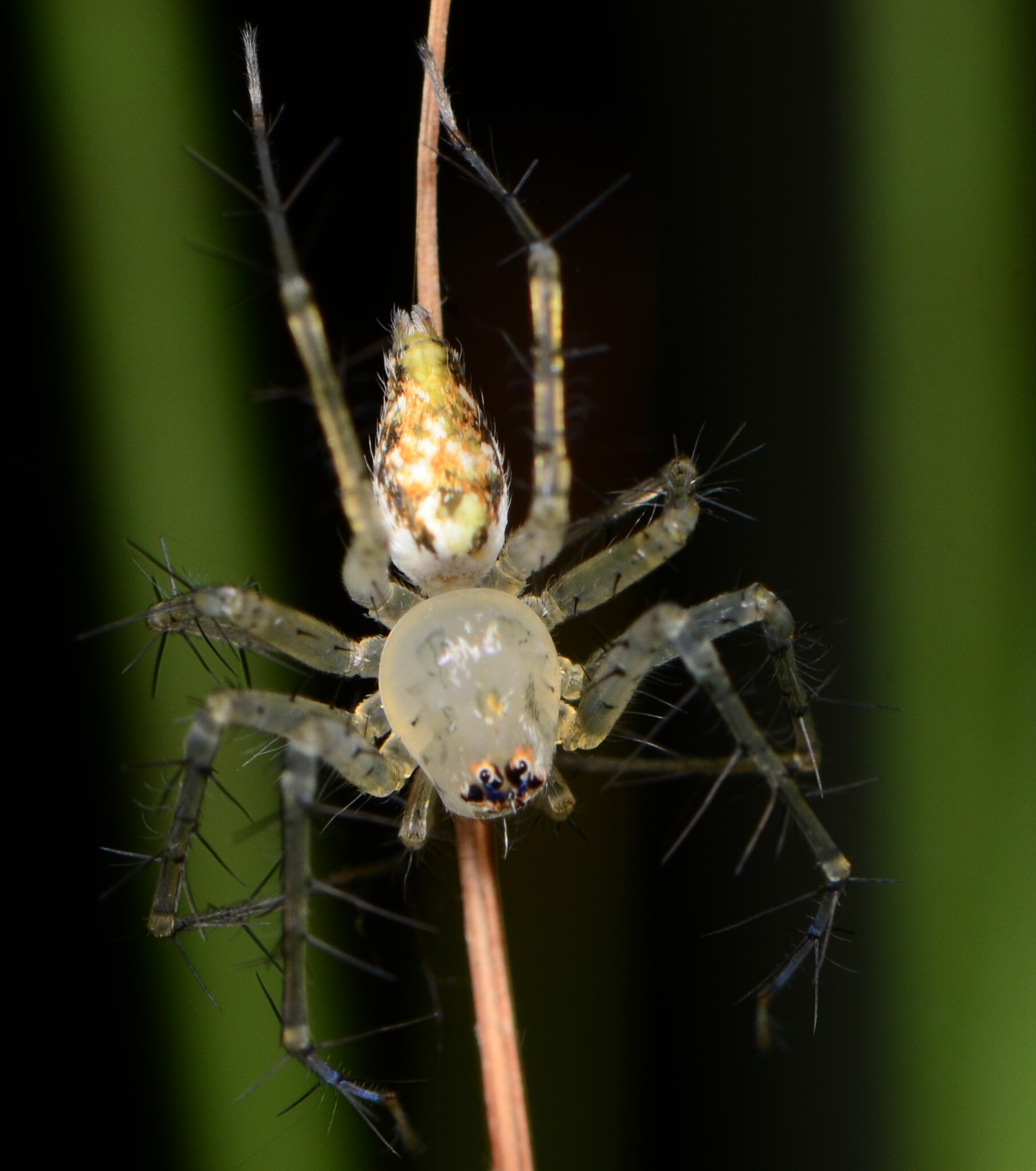
female

== Conservation ==
Oxyopes longispinosus is listed as Least Concern by the South African National Biodiversity Institute due to its wide geographic range across three African countries. The species is protected in more than ten protected areas and faces no significant threats.
