= List of Oxyopidae species =

This page lists all described species of the spider family Oxyopidae accepted by the World Spider Catalog as of May 2024:

== Hamadruas ==
Hamadruas

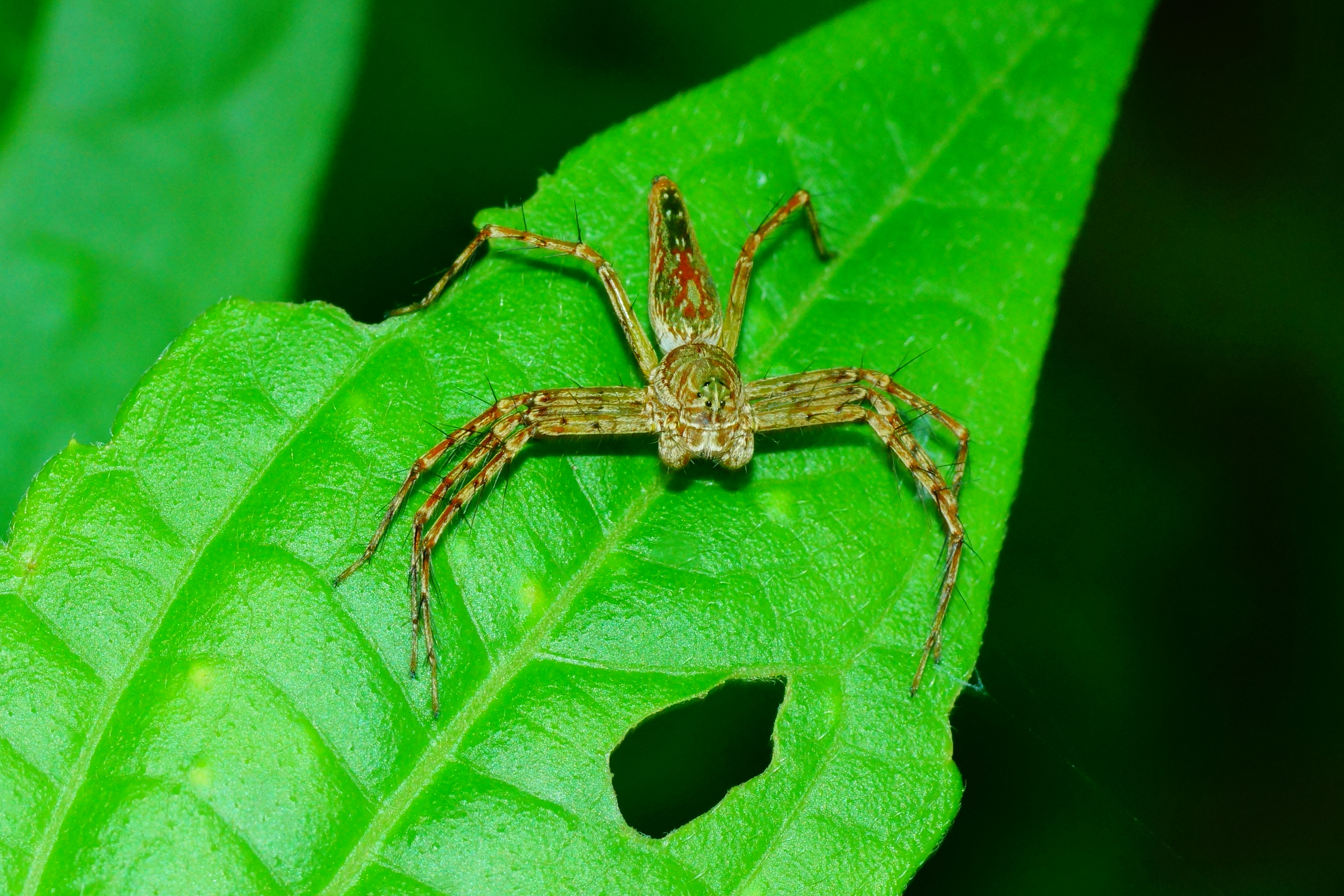
Hamadruas sikkimensis

Hamadruas Deeleman-Reinhold, 2009

- H. austera (Thorell, 1894) — Singapore
- H. heterosticta (Pocock, 1897) — Indonesia (Sulawesi, Moluccas)
- H. hieroglyphica (Thorell, 1887) (type) — China, Myanmar
- H. insulana (Thorell, 1891) — India (Nicobar Is.)
- H. keralensis Sen & Sudhin, 2023 — India
- H. pupulus (Thorell, 1890) — Indonesia (Nias Is.)
- H. severa (Thorell, 1895) — Myanmar, Indonesia (Lombok)
- H. signifera (Doleschall, 1859) — Indonesia (Java)
- H. sikkimensis (Tikader, 1970) — India, Bangladesh, China
- H. superba (Thorell, 1887) — Myanmar, Thailand, Indonesia (Borneo)

== Hamataliwa ==
Hamataliwa

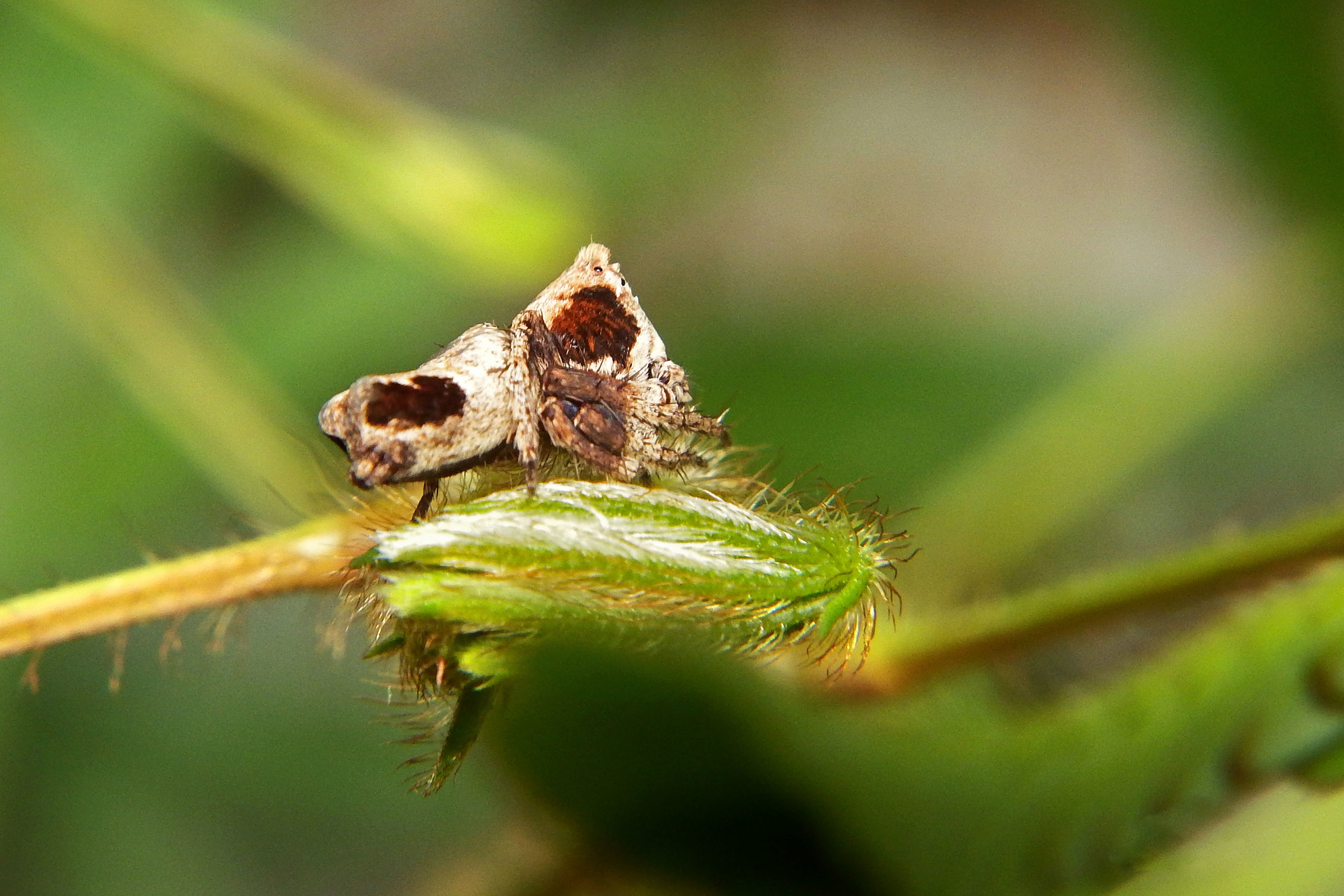
Hamataliwa sp.

Hamataliwa Keyserling, 1887

- H. albibarbis (Mello-Leitão, 1947) — Brazil
- H. argyrescens Mello-Leitão, 1929 — Brazil
- H. aurita Zhang, Zhu & Song, 2005 — China
- H. banksi (Mello-Leitão, 1928) — Mexico to Costa Rica
- H. barroana (Chamberlin & Ivie, 1936) — Mexico to Panama
- H. bicolor (Mello-Leitão, 1929) — Brazil
- H. bituberculata (Mello-Leitão, 1929) — Brazil, Guyana
- H. brunnea (F. O. Pickard-Cambridge, 1902) — Mexico
- H. buelowae Mello-Leitão, 1945 — Argentina
- H. bufo Brady, 1970 — Panama
- H. catenula Deeleman-Reinhold, 2009 — Malaysia, Indonesia (Borneo, Sunda Is.)
- H. caudata Mello-Leitão, 1929 — Brazil
- H. cavata (Kraus, 1955) — El Salvador
- H. cheta Brady, 1970 — Guatemala
- H. circularis (Kraus, 1955) — El Salvador
- H. communicans (Chamberlin, 1925) — Hispaniola
- H. cooki Grimshaw, 1989 — Australia (Northern Territory, Queensland)
- H. cordata Zhang, Zhu & Song, 2005 — China
- H. cornuta (Thorell, 1895) — Myanmar
- H. crista Amulya, Sebastian & Sudhikumar, 2022 — India
- H. crocata Brady, 1970 — Panama
- H. cucullata Tang, Wang & Peng, 2012 — China
- H. difficilis (O. Pickard-Cambridge, 1894) — Mexico
- H. dimidiata (Soares & Camargo, 1948) — Brazil
- H. dubia (Mello-Leitão, 1929) — Brazil
- H. facilis (O. Pickard-Cambridge, 1894) — Mexico, Guatemala
- H. flebilis (O. Pickard-Cambridge, 1894) — Mexico to Panama
- H. floreni Deeleman-Reinhold, 2009 — Malaysia, Indonesia (Borneo)
- H. foveata Tang & Li, 2012 — China
- H. fronticornis (Lessert, 1927) — DR Congo, South Africa
- H. fronto (Thorell, 1890) — Indonesia (Sumatra)
- H. globosa (F. O. Pickard-Cambridge, 1902) — Mexico to Panama
- H. grisea Keyserling, 1887 (type) — USA, Mexico
- H. haytiana (Chamberlin, 1925) — Hispaniola
- H. helia (Chamberlin, 1929) — USA, Mexico, Guyana, Thailand, Malaysia (Sarawak), Brunei, Indonesia (Sumatra)
- H. hellia Dhali, Saha & Raychaudhuri, 2017 — India
- H. hista Brady, 1970 — Panama
- H. ignifuga Deeleman-Reinhold, 2009 — Borneo
- H. incompta (Thorell, 1895) — India, Myanmar, Thailand, Malaysia, Philippines, Indonesia (Borneo)
- H. indica Sen & Sureshan, 2022 – India
- H. kulczynskii (Lessert, 1915) — Ethiopia, Botswana, Eswatini, South Africa
- H. labialis (Song, 1991) — China
- H. laeta (O. Pickard-Cambridge, 1894) — Mexico
- H. latifrons (Thorell, 1890) — Indonesia (Sumatra)
- H. maculipes (Bryant, 1923) — Antigua and Barbuda (Antigua)
- H. manca Tang & Li, 2012 — China
- H. marmorata Simon, 1898 — Brazil, Paraguay
- H. menglunensis Tang & Li, 2012 — China
- H. micropunctata (Mello-Leitão, 1929) — Brazil
- H. monroei Grimshaw, 1989 — Australia (Queensland)
- H. nigrescens Mello-Leitão, 1929 — Brazil
- H. nigritarsa Bryant, 1948 — Hispaniola
- H. nigriventris (Mello-Leitão, 1929) — Brazil
- H. obtusa (Thorell, 1892) — Indonesia (Sumatra)
- H. oculata Tang & Li, 2012 — China
- H. ovata (Biswas, Kundu, Kundu, Saha & Raychaudhuri, 1996) — India
- H. pedicula Tang & Li, 2012 — China
- H. penicillata Mello-Leitão, 1948 — Guyana
- H. pentagona Tang & Li, 2012 — India, China
- H. perdita Mello-Leitão, 1929 — Brazil
- H. peterjaegeri Deeleman-Reinhold, 2009 — Borneo
- H. pilulifera Tang & Li, 2012 — China
- H. porcata (Simon, 1898) — Brazil
- H. positiva Chamberlin, 1924 — Mexico
- H. pricompta Deeleman-Reinhold, 2009 — Borneo, Sumatra
- H. puta (O. Pickard-Cambridge, 1894) — Mexico to Panama
- H. quadrimaculata (Mello-Leitão, 1929) — Brazil
- H. rana (Simon, 1898) — Caribbean
- H. reticulata (Biswas, Kundu, Kundu, Saha & Raychaudhuri, 1996) — India
- H. rhombiae Amulya & Sudhikumar, 2022 — India
- H. rostrifrons (Lawrence, 1928) — Namibia, South Africa
- H. rufocaligata Simon, 1898 — Ethiopia, Djibouti, Somalia, Botswana, South Africa
- H. sanmenensis Song & Zheng, 1992 — China
- H. schmidti Reimoser, 1939 — Mexico to Costa Rica
- H. strandi (Lessert, 1923) — Mozambique, South Africa
- H. subfacilis (O. Pickard-Cambridge, 1894) — Mexico
- H. subhadrae (Tikader, 1970) — China, India
- H. submanca Tang & Li, 2012 — China
- H. torsiva Tang, Wang & Peng, 2012 — China
- H. triangularis (Kraus, 1955) — El Salvador, Panama
- H. tricuspidata (F. O. Pickard-Cambridge, 1902) — Costa Rica to Guyana
- H. truncata (Thorell, 1897) — Vietnam
- H. tuberculata (Chamberlin, 1925) — Cuba
- H. unca Brady, 1964 — USA
- H. ursa Brady, 1970 — Panama
- H. vanbruggeni Deeleman-Reinhold, 2009 — Borneo
- H. wangi Lin & Li, 2022 — China

== Hostus ==
Hostus Simon, 1898

- H. paroculus Simon, 1898 (type) — Madagascar

== Oxyopes ==
Oxyopes

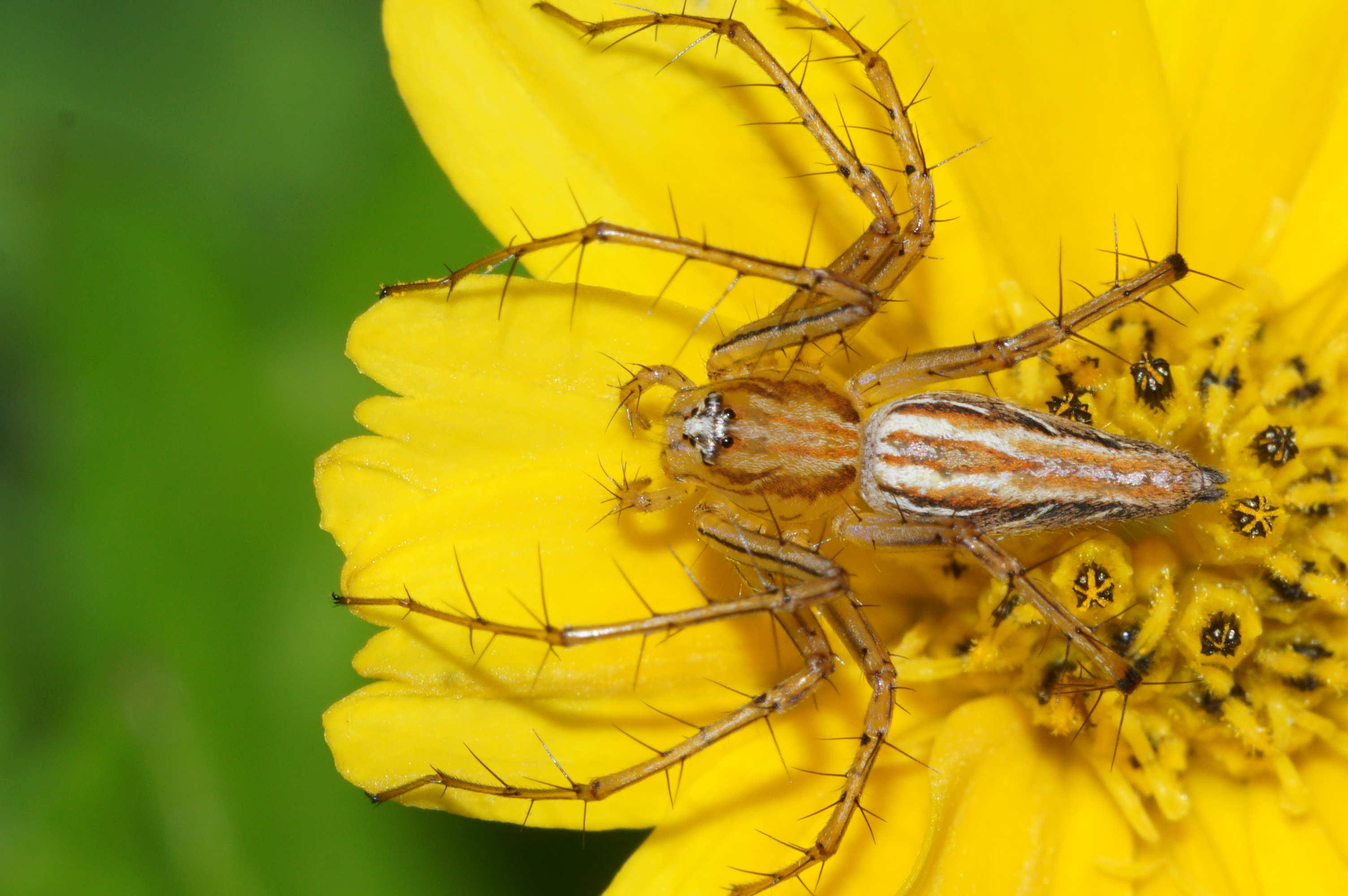
Oxyopes javanus

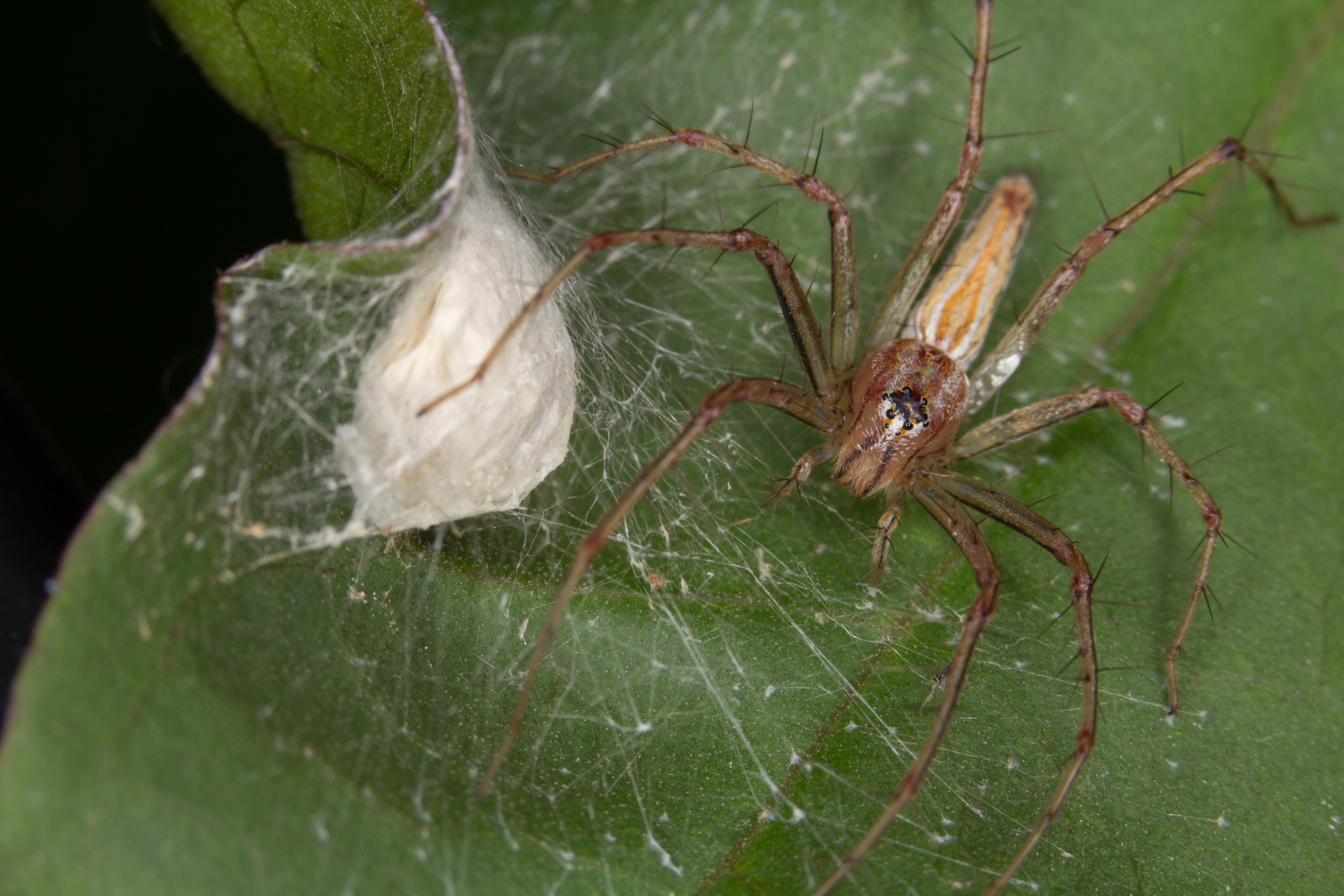
Lean lynx spider
(Oxyopes macilentus)

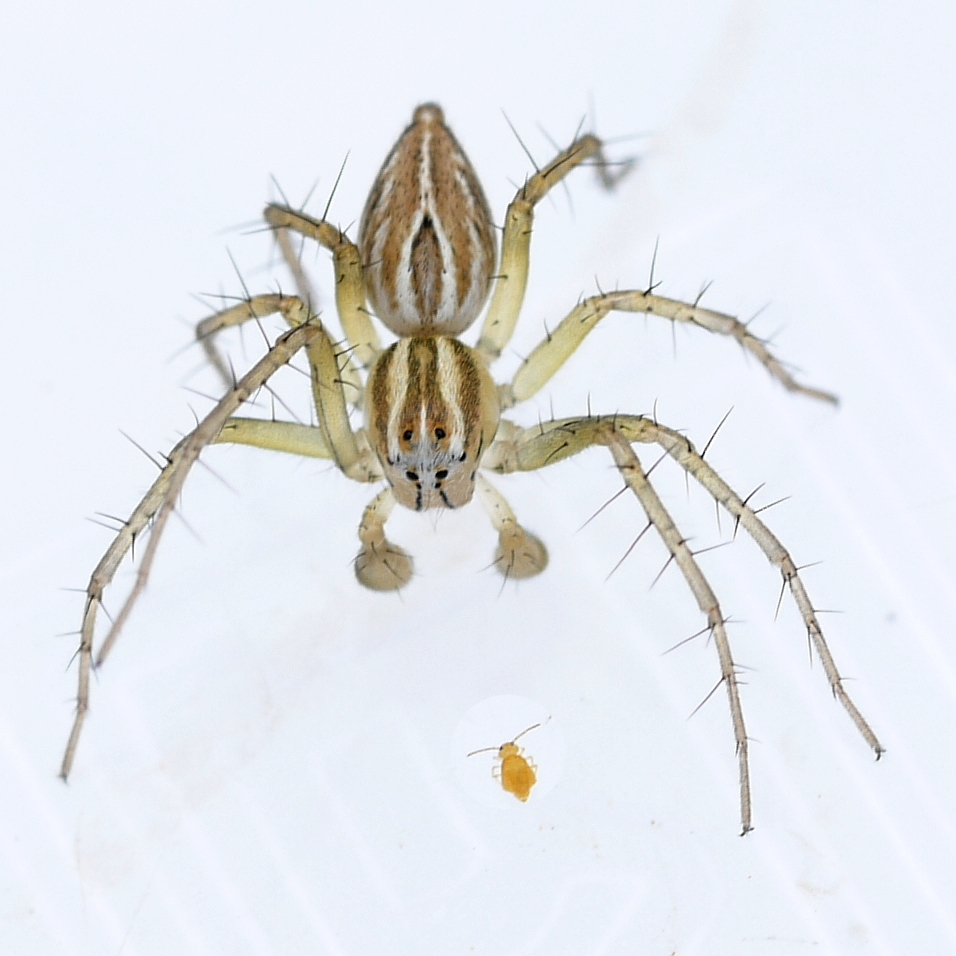
Striped lynx spider
(Oxyopes salticus )

Oxyopes Latreille, 1804

- O. acleistus Chamberlin, 1929 — USA, Mexico
- O. aculeatus Bösenberg & Lenz, 1895 — East Africa
- O. affinis Lessert, 1915 — DR Congo, Tanzania, Mozambique, South Africa
- O. aglossus Chamberlin, 1929 — USA
- O. albertianus Strand, 1913 — Congo, Uganda
- O. algerianus (Walckenaer, 1841) — Morocco, Algeria
- O. allectus Simon, 1909 — Gabon, Guinea-Bissau
- O. altifrons Mello-Leitão, 1941 — Brazil
- O. amoenus L. Koch, 1878 — Australia (Queensland, New South Wales, South Australia?, Northern Territory?)
- O. angulitarsus Lessert, 1915 — Uganda, South Africa
- O. annularis Yin, Zhang & Bao, 2003 — China
- O. annulipes Thorell, 1890 — Indonesia (Sumatra)
- O. apollo Brady, 1964 — USA, Mexico
- O. arcuatus Yin, Zhang & Bao, 2003 — China
- O. argentosus Simon, 1909 — Guinea-Bissau
- O. argyrotrichius Mello-Leitão, 1929 — Brazil
- O. armatipalpis Strand, 1912 — India
- O. artemis Brady, 1969 — USA
- O. arushae Caporiacco, 1947 — East Africa
- O. ashae Gajbe, 1999 — India
- O. aspirasi Barrion & Litsinger, 1995 — Philippines
- O. assamensis Tikader, 1969 — India
- O. asterion Simon, 1909 — Guinea-Bissau
- O. attenuatus L. Koch, 1878 — Australia (Queensland)
- O. auratus Thorell, 1890 — Singapore, Indonesia (Sumatra)
- O. aureolus Thorell, 1899 — Cameroon
- O. auriculatus Lawrence, 1927 — Namibia
- O. azhari Butt & Beg, 2001 — Pakistan
- O. baccatus Simon, 1897 — Ethiopia
- O. badhyzicus Mikhailov & Fet, 1986 — Israel, Iran, Turkmenistan
- O. balteiformis Yin, Zhang & Bao, 2003 — China
- O. bantaengi Merian, 1911 — Indonesia (Sulawesi)
- O. bedoti Lessert, 1915 — East Africa, South Africa
- O. berlandorum Lessert, 1915 — East Africa
- O. bharatae Gajbe, 1999 — India
- O. bicorneus Zhang & Zhu, 2005 — China
- O. bidentata Mukhtar, 2017 — Pakistan
- O. bifidus F. O. Pickard-Cambridge, 1902 — Mexico to Panama
- O. bifissus F. O. Pickard-Cambridge, 1902 — Mexico to Costa Rica
- O. biharensis Gajbe, 1999 — India
- O. birabeni Mello-Leitão, 1941 — Argentina
- O. birmanicus Thorell, 1887 — India, China to Indonesia (Sumatra)
- O. bolivianus Tullgren, 1905 — Bolivia
- O. bonneti Lessert, 1933 — Angola, South Africa
- O. boriensis Bodkhe & Vankhede, 2012 — India
- O. bothai Lessert, 1915 — Ethiopia, Tanzania, South Africa
- O. bouvieri Berland, 1922 — Ethiopia
- O. brachiatus Simon, 1909 — Equatorial Guinea (Bioko), Congo
- O. brevis Thorell, 1881 — Indonesia (Aru Is.)
- O. caboverdensis Schmidt & Krause, 1994 — Cape Verde Is.
- O. calcaratus Schenkel, 1944 — Timor
- O. campestratus Simon, 1909 — Guinea-Bissau, Equatorial Guinea (Bioko), São Tomé and Príncipe
- O. campii Mushtaq & Qadar, 1999 — Pakistan
- O. camponis Strand, 1915 — Cameroon
- O. candidoi Garcia-Neto, 1995 — Brazil
- O. caporiaccoi Roewer, 1951 — Ethiopia
- O. carvalhoi Mello-Leitão, 1947 — Brazil
- O. castaneus Lawrence, 1927 — Namibia, South Africa
- O. ceylonicus Karsch, 1892 — Sri Lanka
- O. chapini Lessert, 1927 — DR Congo, Namibia, South Africa
- O. chenabensis Mukhtar, 2017 — Pakistan
- O. chiapas Brady, 1975 — Mexico
- O. chittrae Tikader, 1965 — India
- O. coccineoventris Lessert, 1946 — Congo
- O. cochinchinensis (Walckenaer, 1837) — Vietnam
- O. complicatus Tang & Li, 2012 — China
- O. concolor Simon, 1877 — Philippines
- O. concoloratus Roewer, 1951 — Ethiopia
- O. constrictus Keyserling, 1891 — Brazil, Guyana
- O. cornifrons (Thorell, 1899) — Cameroon, Guinea-Bissau
  - O. c. avakubensis Lessert, 1927 — Cameroon, Guinea-Bissau, DR Congo, South Africa
- O. cornutus F. O. Pickard-Cambridge, 1902 — Mexico
- O. cougar Brady, 1969 — USA
- O. crassus Schmidt & Krause, 1995 — Cape Verde Is.
- O. crewi Bryant, 1948 — Bahamas, Cuba, Jamaica, Hispaniola, St. Kitts and Nevis
- O. daksina Sherriffs, 1955 — Sri Lanka, China
- O. decorosus Zhang & Zhu, 2005 — China
- O. delesserti Caporiacco, 1947 — Ethiopia, East Africa
- O. delmonteensis Barrion & Litsinger, 1995 — Philippines
- O. dinendrai Sen & Sureshan, 2021 — India
- O. dingo Strand, 1913 — Central Australia
- O. dubourgi Simon, 1904 — Sudan, Congo
- O. dumonti (Vinson, 1863) — Ethiopia, Zimbabwe, South Africa, Seychelles, Madagascar, Réunion, Mauritius
- O. elegans L. Koch, 1878 — Australia (New South Wales, Northern Territory?, Queensland?, Victoria?)
- O. elifaz Levy, 2007 — Israel, Jordan
- O. elongatus Biswas, Kundu, Kundu, Saha & Raychaudhuri, 1996 — India
- O. extensipes (Butler, 1876) — Mauritius (Rodriguez)
- O. fabae Dhali, Saha & Raychaudhuri, 2015 — India
- O. falcatus Zhang, Yang & Zhu, 2005 — China
- O. falconeri Lessert, 1915 — Tanzania, Namibia, Botswana, Zimbabwe, South Africa
- O. fallax Denis, 1955 — Niger
- O. felinus Brady, 1964 — USA, Mexico
- O. flavipalpis (Lucas, 1858) — Ethiopia, Somalia, Cameroon, DR Congo, Guinea, Tanzania, Zimbabwe, South Africa, Eswatini
- O. flavus Banks, 1898 — Mexico to Costa Rica
- O. fluminensis Mello-Leitão, 1929 — Brazil
- O. forcipiformis Xie & Kim, 1996 — China
- O. fujianicus Song & Zhu, 1993 — China, Taiwan
- O. galla Caporiacco, 1941 — Ethiopia, Namibia, South Africa
- O. gaofengensis Zhang, Zhang & Kim, 2005 — China
- O. gemellus Thorell, 1891 — India (Nicobar Is.), Malaysia
- O. globifer Simon, 1876 — Mediterranean to Central Asia
- O. godeffroyi Baehr, Harms, Dupérré & Raven, 2017 — Australia (Queensland)
- O. gorumaraensis Sen, Saha & Raychaudhuri, 2011 — India
- O. gossypae Mushtaq & Qadar, 1999 — Pakistan
- O. gracilipes (White, 1849) — Australia (New South Wales, Queensland), New Zealand
- O. gratus L. Koch, 1878 — Australia (Queensland, ?Victoria, ?Northern Territory,?Western Australia)
- O. gujaratensis Gajbe, 1999 — India
- O. gurjanti Sadana & Gupta, 1995 — India
- O. gyirongensis Hu & Li, 1987 — China
- O. haryanaensis Goyal & Malik, 2020 — India
- O. hasta Lo, Cheng & Lin, 2021 — Taiwan
- O. hastifer Simon, 1909 — Guinea-Bissau
- O. hemorrhous Mello-Leitão, 1929 — Brazil
- O. heterophthalmus (Latreille, 1804) (type) — Europe, North Africa to Middle East, Turkey, Caucasus, Kazakhstan, China
- O. hilaris Thorell, 1881 — Timor
- O. hindostanicus Pocock, 1901 — Pakistan, India, Sri Lanka
- O. hoggi Lessert, 1915 — Tanzania, Angola, Zimbabwe, South Africa
- O. holmbergi Soares & Camargo, 1948 — Brazil
- O. hotingchiehi Schenkel, 1963 — China, India
- O. hupingensis Bao & Yin, 2002 — China
- O. idoneus Simon, 1909 — Guinea-Bissau
- O. imbellis Thorell, 1890 — Malaysia
- O. incantatus Santos, 2017 — Ecuador (Galapagos)
- O. incertus Mello-Leitão, 1929 — Peru, Brazil
- O. indiculus Thorell, 1897 — Myanmar
- O. indicus (Walckenaer, 1805) — India
- O. inversus Mello-Leitão, 1949 — Brazil
- O. iranicus Esyunin, Rad & Kamoneh, 2011 — Iran
- O. isangipinus Barrion, Barrion-Dupo & Heong, 2013 — China (Hainan)
- O. jabalpurensis Gajbe & Gajbe, 1999 — India
- O. jacksoni Lessert, 1915 — Tanzania, Malawi, Botswana, Zimbabwe, South Africa
- O. javanus Thorell, 1887 — India, Bangladesh, Indonesia (Java), Philippines, China
- O. jianfeng Song, 1991 — China
- O. jubilans O. Pickard-Cambridge, 1885 — Karakorum, Pakistan, China
- O. kamalae Gajbe, 1999 — India
- O. ketani Gajbe & Gajbe, 1999 — India
- O. keyserlingi Thorell, 1881 — New Guinea
- O. kobrooricus Strand, 1911 — Indonesia (Aru Is.)
- O. kochi Thorell, 1897 — Myanmar
- O. kohaensis Bodkhe & Vankhede, 2012 — India
- O. kolkhasensis Sarkar, Bodkhe & Uniyal, 2021 — India
- O. koreanus Paik, 1969 — Korea, Japan
- O. kovacsi Caporiacco, 1947 — Ethiopia
- O. kraepelinorum Bösenberg, 1895 — Canary Is.
- O. kumarae Biswas & Roy, 2005 — India
- O. kusumae Gajbe, 1999 — India
- O. lagarus Thorell, 1895 — Myanmar
- O. lepidus (Blackwall, 1864) — India
- O. licenti Schenkel, 1953 — Russia (Middle Siberia to Far East), China, Korea, Japan
- O. linearis Sen, Dhali, Saha & Raychaudhuri, 2015 — India
- O. lineatipes (C. L. Koch, 1847) — China to Philippines, Indonesia (Sumatra, Java)
- O. lineatus Latreille, 1806 — Europe, Turkey, Caucasus, Russia (Europe to Central Asia), Middle East, Central Asia
  - O. l. occidentalis Kulczyński, 1907 — Italy
- O. longespina Caporiacco, 1940 — Ethiopia
- O. longetibiatus Caporiacco, 1941 — Ethiopia
- O. longinquus Thorell, 1891 — Myanmar, India (Nicobar Is.)
- O. longipalpis Lessert, 1946 — Congo
- O. longispinosus Lawrence, 1938 — Tanzania, Botswana, South Africa
- O. longispinus Saha & Raychaudhuri, 2003 — India
- O. ludhianaensis Sadana & Goel, 1995 — India
- O. lynx Brady, 1964 — USA
- O. machuensis Mukhtar, 2013 — Pakistan
- O. macilentus L. Koch, 1878 — Japan, China to Australia
- O. macroscelides Mello-Leitão, 1929 — Brazil, Paraguay
- O. maripae Caporiacco, 1954 — French Guiana
- O. masculinus Caporiacco, 1954 — French Guiana
- O. mathias Strand, 1913 — Uganda
- O. matiensis Barrion & Litsinger, 1995 — Philippines
- O. mediterraneus Levy, 1999 — Portugal, Spain, Greece, Cyprus, Israel, Iran
- O. megalops Caporiacco, 1947 — East Africa
- O. minutus Biswas, Kundu, Kundu, Saha & Raychaudhuri, 1996 — India
- O. mirabilis Zhang, Yang & Zhu, 2005 — China
- O. modestus Simon, 1876 — Congo
- O. molarius L. Koch, 1878 — Australia (Queensland, South Australia?, New South Wales?)
- O. mundulus L. Koch, 1878 — Australia (New South Wales, Tasmania?)
- O. naliniae Gajbe, 1999 — India
- O. nanulineatus Levy, 1999 — Israel
- O. nenilini Esyunin & Tuneva, 2009 — Uzbekistan, China
- O. nigripalpis Kulczyński, 1891 — Mediterranean
- O. nilgiricus Sherriffs, 1955 — India, Sri Lanka
- O. ningxiaensis Tang & Song, 1990 — China
- O. niveosigillatus Mello-Leitão, 1945 — Argentina
- O. obscurifrons Simon, 1909 — São Tomé and Príncipe
- O. occidens Brady, 1964 — USA, Mexico
- O. ocelot Brady, 1975 — Mexico
- O. ornatus (Blackwall, 1868) — Tropical Africa
- O. oryzae Mushtaq & Qadar, 1999 — Pakistan
- O. pallidecoloratus Strand, 1906 — Ethiopia, Congo, Southern Africa, Madagascar
  - O. p. nigricans Caporiacco, 1947 — East Africa
- O. pallidus (C. L. Koch, 1838) — Caribbean
- O. palliventer Strand, 1911 — Indonesia (Aru Is.)
- O. pandae Tikader, 1969 — India, Bangladesh
- O. pankaji Gajbe & Gajbe, 2000 — India
- O. panther Brady, 1975 — USA, Mexico
- O. papuanus Thorell, 1881 — New Guinea, Solomon Is., Australia (Queensland)
- O. pardus Brady, 1964 — USA
- O. patalongensis Simon, 1901 — Malaysia
- O. pawani Gajbe, 1992 — India
- O. peetham Amulya, Sebastian & Sudhikumar, 2022 — India
- O. pennatus Schenkel, 1936 — China
- O. personatus Simon, 1896 — South Africa
- O. pigmentatus Simon, 1890 — Israel, Yemen
- O. pingasus Barrion & Litsinger, 1995 — Philippines
- O. positivus Roewer, 1961 — Senegal
- O. praedictus O. Pickard-Cambridge, 1885 — China (Yarkand)
- O. providens Thorell, 1890 — Indonesia (Sumatra)
- O. pugilator Mello-Leitão, 1929 — Brazil
- O. pulchellus (Lucas, 1858) — Congo
- O. punctatus L. Koch, 1878 — Australia (Queensland)
- O. purpurissatus Simon, 1909 — Congo
- O. quadridentatus Thorell, 1895 — Myanmar
- O. quadrifasciatus L. Koch, 1878 — Australia (Queensland)
- O. rajai Saha & Raychaudhuri, 2003 — India
- O. ramosus (Martini & Goeze, 1778) — Europe, Turkey, Caucasus, Russia (Europe to South Siberia), Kazakhstan, Korea
- O. ratnae Tikader, 1970 — Pakistan, India, Bangladesh
- O. raviensis Dyal, 1935 — Pakistan
- O. reddyi Majumder, 2004 — India
- O. reimoseri Caporiacco, 1947 — East Africa
- O. rejectus O. Pickard-Cambridge, 1885 — China (Yarkand)
- O. rouxi Strand, 1911 — Indonesia (Aru Is.)
- O. royi Roewer, 1961 — Senegal
- O. rubicundus L. Koch, 1878 — Australia (New South Wales)
- O. rubriventer Caporiacco, 1941 — East Africa
  - O. r. paecilus Caporiacco, 1941 — Ethiopia
- O. rubrosignatus Keyserling, 1891 — Brazil
- O. rufisternis Pocock, 1901 — Pakistan, India, Sri Lanka
- O. rufovittatus Simon, 1886 — Senegal
- O. rukminiae Gajbe, 1999 — India
- O. russoi Caporiacco, 1940 — Somalia, South Africa, Eswatini
- O. russulus Thorell, 1895 — Myanmar
- O. rutilius Simon, 1890 — Yemen (mainland, Socotra)
- O. ruwenzoricus Strand, 1913 — Uganda
- O. ryvesi Pocock, 1901 — India, Pakistan
- O. saganus Bösenberg & Strand, 1906 — Japan
- O. sakuntalae Tikader, 1970 — India
- O. salticus Hentz, 1845 — USA to northern Argentina and Chile
- O. saradae Biswas & Roy, 2005 — India
- O. sataricus Kulkarni & Deshpande, 2012 — India
- O. scalaris Hentz, 1845 — North America
- O. scapeus Sen & Sureshan, 2021 — India
- O. schenkeli Lessert, 1927 — DR Congo, Uganda, Botswana, Zimbabwe, South Africa
- O. sectus Mello-Leitão, 1929 — Brazil
- O. septumatus Mukhtar, 2013 — Pakistan
- O. sertatoides Xie & Kim, 1996 — China
- O. sertatus L. Koch, 1878 — India, China, Taiwan, Korea, Japan
- O. setipes Thorell, 1890 — Borneo
- O. sexmaculatus Mello-Leitão, 1929 — Peru, Brazil
- O. shakilae Mukhtar, 2013 — Pakistan
- O. shorkotensis Mukhtar, 2013 — Pakistan
- O. shweta Tikader, 1970 — Pakistan, India, China
- O. sinaiticus Levy, 1999 — Egypt
- O. singularis Lessert, 1927 — DR Congo, Namibia, Zimbabwe, South Africa
- O. sitae Tikader, 1970 — India (mainland, Andaman Is.), Bangladesh
- O. sjostedti Lessert, 1915 — Ethiopia, Tanzania, South Africa
- O. sobrinus O. Pickard-Cambridge, 1872 — Libya, Cyprus, Israel, United Arab Emirates, Iran
- O. squamosus Simon, 1886 — Senegal
- O. stephanurus Mello-Leitão, 1929 — Brazil
- O. strandi Caporiacco, 1939 — Ethiopia
- O. striagatus Song, 1991 — China, Taiwan
- O. striatus (Doleschall, 1857) — Myanmar to New Guinea
- O. subabebae Caporiacco, 1941 — Ethiopia, South Africa
- O. subimali Biswas, Kundu, Kundu, Saha & Raychaudhuri, 1996 — India
- O. submirabilis Tang & Li, 2012 — China
- O. summus Brady, 1975 — Costa Rica, Panama
- O. sunandae Tikader, 1970 — India, Bangladesh
- O. sushilae Tikader, 1965 — India, China, Taiwan
- O. taeniatulus Roewer, 1955 — Brazil
- O. taeniatus Thorell, 1877 — Indonesia (Sumatra, Java, Sulawesi)
- O. taiwanensis Lo, Cheng & Lin, 2021 — Taiwan
- O. takobius Andreeva & Tystshenko, 1969 — Central Asia to China
- O. tapponiformis Strand, 1911 — Indonesia (Moluccas), New Guinea
- O. tenellus Song, 1991 — China
- O. thumboormuzhiensis Amulya, Honey & Sudhikumar, 2022 — India
- O. tibialis F. O. Pickard-Cambridge, 1902 — Mexico, Guatemala, El Salvador, Nicaragua
- O. tiengianensis Barrion & Litsinger, 1995 — Vietnam
- O. tikaderi Biswas & Majumder, 1995 — India
- O. timorensis Schenkel, 1944 — Timor
- O. timorianus (Walckenaer, 1837) — Timor
- O. toschii Caporiacco, 1949 — Kenya
- O. travancoricola Strand, 1912 — India
- O. tridens Brady, 1964 — USA, Mexico
- O. tuberculatus Lessert, 1915 — Tanzania, South Africa, Eswatini
  - O. t. mombensis Lessert, 1915 — East Africa
- O. ubensis Strand, 1906 — Ethiopia
- O. uncinatus Lessert, 1915 — Tanzania, South Africa
- O. vanderysti Lessert, 1946 — DR Congo, South Africa
- O. variabilis L. Koch, 1878 — Australia (Queensland, Western Australia?, South Australia?, New South Wales?)
- O. versicolor Thorell, 1887 — Myanmar
- O. vogelsangeri Lessert, 1946 — DR Congo, South Africa
- O. wokamanus Strand, 1911 — Indonesia (Aru Is.)
- O. wroughtoni Pocock, 1901 — Pakistan, India
- O. xinjiangensis Hu & Wu, 1989 — Kazakhstan, China
- O. zavattarii Caporiacco, 1939 — Ethiopia
- † O. defectus Wunderlich, 1988
- † O. succini Petrunkevitch, 1958

== Peucetia ==
Peucetia

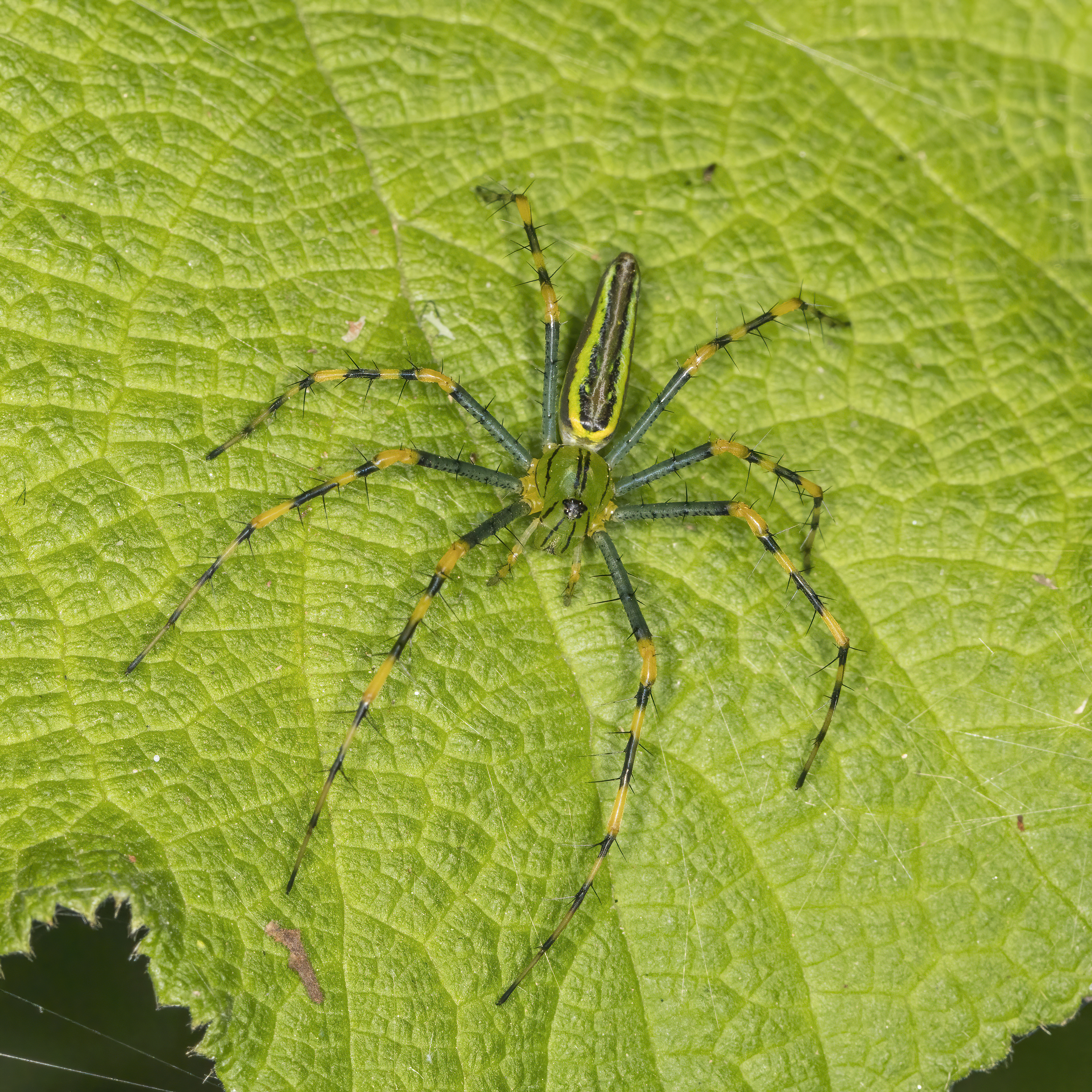
Malagasy green lynx spider
(Peucetia madagascariensis), male

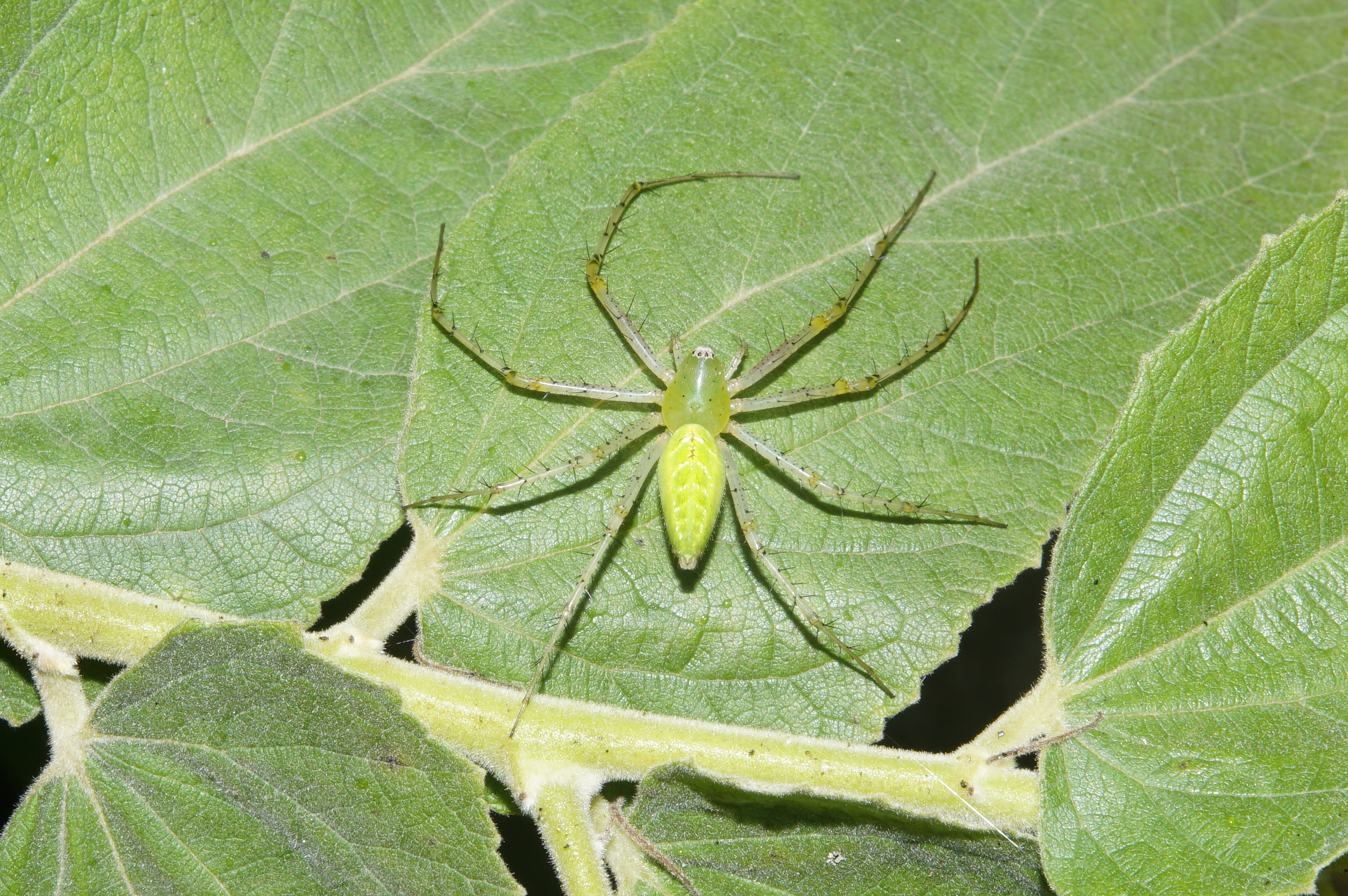
Peucetia viridana

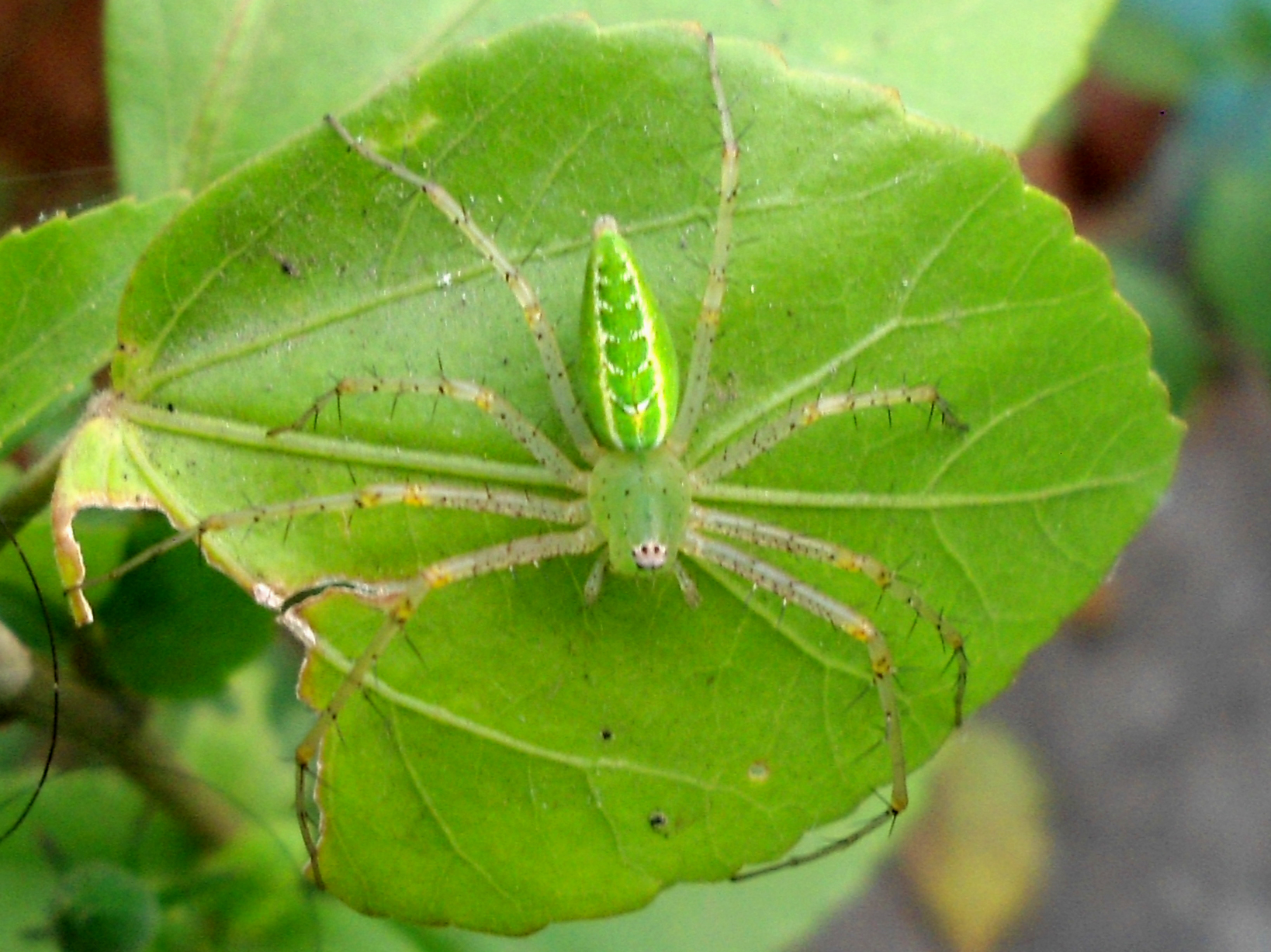
Green lynx spider
(Peucetia viridans)

Peucetia Thorell, 1869

- P. akwadaensis Patel, 1978 — India, China
- P. albescens L. Koch, 1878 — Australia (Queensland)
- P. ananthakrishnani Murugesan, Mathew, Sudhikumar, Sunish, Biju & Sebastian, 2006 — India
- P. arabica Simon, 1882 — Greece, North, East Africa, Middle East
- P. ashae Gajbe & Gajbe, 1999 — India
- P. betlaensis Saha & Raychaudhuri, 2007 — India
- P. biharensis Gajbe, 1999 — India
- P. casseli Simon, 1900 — West, Central Africa
- P. cayapa Santos & Brescovit, 2003 — Ecuador, Peru
- P. chhaparajnirvin N. Kumari, V. Kumari, Bodhke & Zafri, 2024 — India
- P. choprai Tikader, 1965 — India
- P. crucifera Lawrence, 1927 — Namibia, Botswana, Zimbabwe, South Africa
- P. elegans (Blackwall, 1864) — India
- P. flava Keyserling, 1877 — Venezuela to Argentina
- P. formosensis Kishida, 1930 — Taiwan
- P. gauntleta Saha & Raychaudhuri, 2004 — India
- P. gerhardi van Niekerk & Dippenaar-Schoeman, 1994 — West, Central, East Africa
- P. graminea Pocock, 1900 — India
- P. harishankarensis Biswas, 1975 — India
- P. jabalpurensis Gajbe & Gajbe, 1999 — India
- P. ketani Gajbe, 1992 — India
- P. latikae Tikader, 1970 — India, China
- P. lesserti van Niekerk & Dippenaar-Schoeman, 1994 — Niger, Kenya
- P. longipalpis F. O. Pickard-Cambridge, 1902 — USA to Venezuela
- P. lucasi (Vinson, 1863) — Botswana, South Africa, Comoros, Mayotte, Madagascar
- P. macroglossa Mello-Leitão, 1929 — Colombia, Brazil, Guyana
- P. maculifera Pocock, 1900 — South Africa, Lesotho
- P. madagascariensis (Vinson, 1863) — Comoros, Mayotte, Madagascar
- P. madalenae van Niekerk & Dippenaar-Schoeman, 1994 — Mozambique, South Africa
- P. margaritata Hogg, 1914 — Australia (Montebello Is.)
- P. myanmarensis Barrion & Litsinger, 1995 — Myanmar
- P. nicolae van Niekerk & Dippenaar-Schoeman, 1994 — South Africa
- P. pawani Gajbe, 1999 — India
- P. phantasma Ahmed, Satam, Khalap & Mohan, 2015 — India
- P. procera Thorell, 1887 — Myanmar
- P. pulchra (Blackwall, 1865) — Central, Eastern, Southern Africa, Seychelles
- P. punjabensis Gajbe, 1999 — India
- P. rajani Gajbe, 1999 — India
- P. ranganathani Biswas & Roy, 2005 — India
- P. rubrolineata Keyserling, 1877 — Panama to Argentina
- P. striata Karsch, 1878 — Yemen to South Africa, Comoros. Introduced to St. Helena
- P. transvaalica Simon, 1896 — Central, Southern Africa
- P. virescens (O. Pickard-Cambridge, 1872) — Turkey, Middle East
- P. viridana (Stoliczka, 1869) — Pakistan, India, Sri Lanka, Bangladesh, Myanmar
- P. viridans (Hentz, 1832) — North & Central America, Caribbean, Venezuela
- P. viridis (Blackwall, 1858) (type) — Spain, Greece, Africa, Middle East. Introduced to Caribbean Is.
- P. viveki Gajbe, 1999 — India
- P. yogeshi Gajbe, 1999 — India

== † Planoxyopes ==
† Planoxyopes Petrunkevitch, 1963

- † P. eximius Petrunkevitch, 1963

== Pseudohostus ==
Pseudohostus Rainbow, 1915

- P. squamosus Rainbow, 1915 (type) — Australia (South Australia)

== Schaenicoscelis ==
Schaenicoscelis Simon, 1898

- S. concolor Simon, 1898 — Brazil
- S. elegans Simon, 1898 (type) — Brazil
- S. exilis Mello-Leitão, 1930 — Brazil
- S. guianensis Caporiacco, 1947 — Guyana
- S. leucochlora Mello-Leitão, 1929 — Brazil
- S. luteola Mello-Leitão, 1929 — Brazil
- S. viridis Mello-Leitão, 1927 — Brazil

== Tapinillus ==
Tapinillus Simon, 1898

- T. longipes (Taczanowski, 1872) (type) — Costa Rica, Panama, Colombia, Venezuela, French Guiana, Trinidad & Tobago, Peru, Brazil, Argentina
- T. purpuratus Mello-Leitão, 1940 — Brazil
- T. roseisterni Mello-Leitão, 1930 — Brazil

== Tapponia ==
Tapponia

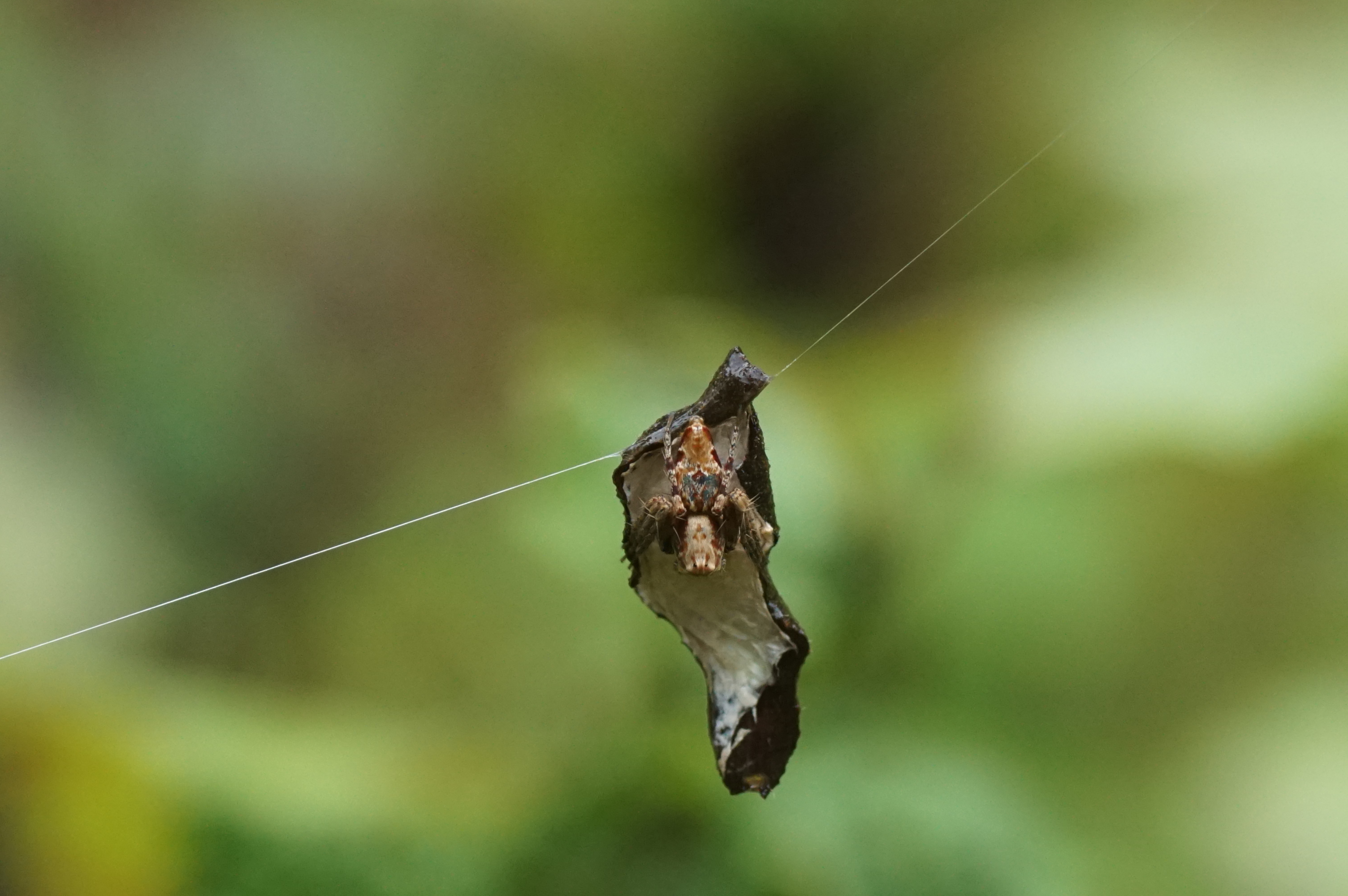
Tapponia micans

Tapponia Simon, 1885

- T. micans Simon, 1885 (type) — Malaysia, Indonesia (Sumatra, Borneo)
