= Oxyopes castaneus =

Lawrence's Lynx Spider

Conservation status
- Least Concern (SANBI Red List)

Scientific classification
- Kingdom: Animalia
- Phylum: Arthropoda
- Subphylum: Chelicerata
- Class: Arachnida
- Order: Araneae
- Infraorder: Araneomorphae
- Family: Oxyopidae
- Genus: Oxyopes
- Species: O. castaneus

Binomial name
- Oxyopes castaneus Lawrence, 1927

Species of spider

Oxyopes castaneus is a species of spider in the family Oxyopidae. It is commonly known as Lawrence's lynx spider.

== Distribution ==
Oxyopes castaneus occurs in Namibia and South Africa. In South Africa, the species is known only from a single locality in KwaZulu-Natal at 42 m above sea level.

== Habitat and ecology ==
The species has been found on grasses within the Savanna biome. Due to the limited collection data, more sampling is needed to fully understand its ecological preferences and distribution range.

== Description ==
Oxyopes castaneus is known only from males.

== Conservation ==
Oxyopes castaneus is listed as Least Concern by the South African National Biodiversity Institute. Despite being known from only one sex and having a limited known range, the large distance between collection locations suggests the species may be under-collected. It is protected in Ndumo Game Reserve.
