= Pseudohostus =

Scientific classification
- Kingdom: Animalia
- Phylum: Arthropoda
- Subphylum: Chelicerata
- Class: Arachnida
- Order: Araneae
- Infraorder: Araneomorphae
- Family: Oxyopidae
- Genus: Pseudohostus; Rainbow, 1915
- Species: P. squamosus

Binomial name
- Pseudohostus squamosus Rainbow, 1915

Genus of spiders

Pseudohostus is a monotypic genus of South Australian lynx spiders containing the single species, Pseudohostus squamosus. It was first described by William Joseph Rainbow in 1915, and is found only in South Australia.
