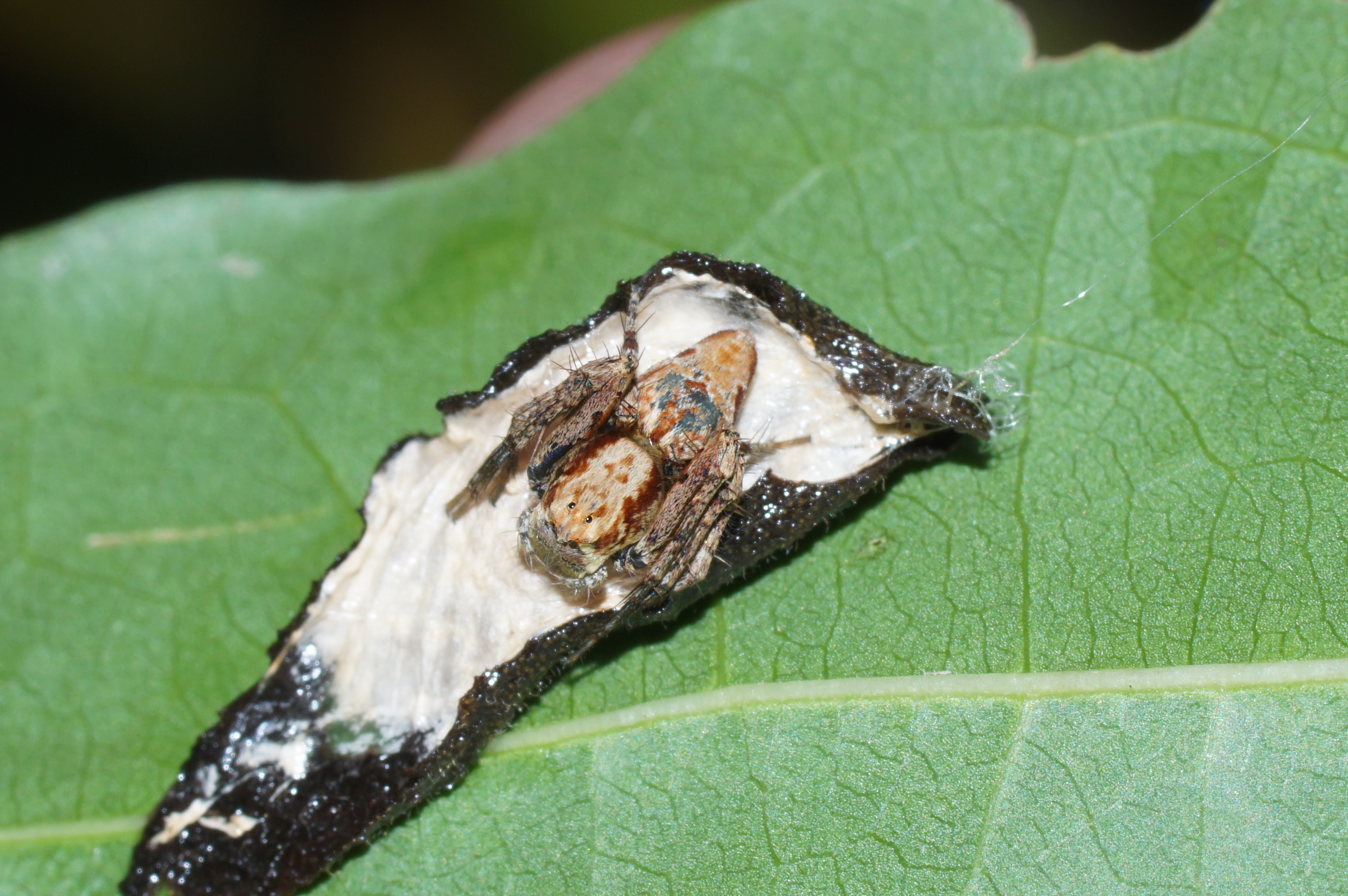

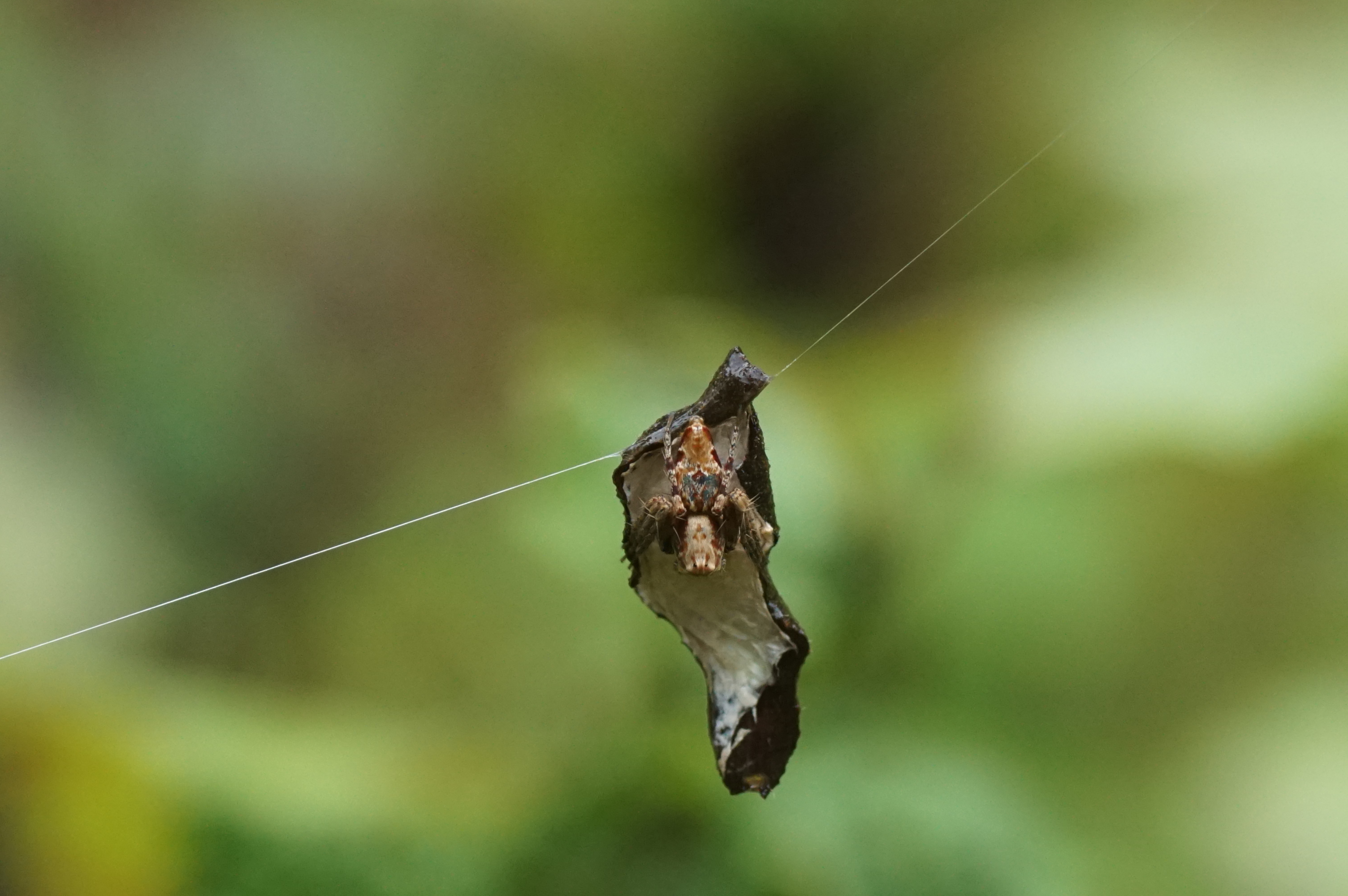

Scientific classification
- Kingdom: Animalia
- Phylum: Arthropoda
- Subphylum: Chelicerata
- Class: Arachnida
- Order: Araneae
- Infraorder: Araneomorphae
- Family: Oxyopidae
- Genus: Tapponia; Simon, 1885

= Tapponia =

Genus of spiders

Tapponia is a genus of Southeast Asian lynx spiders, first described by Eugène Louis Simon in 1885,

It was long considered a monotypic genus with the sole species T. micans, only found in Indonesia and Malaysia. Three new species from Taiwan were described in 2024.

== Species ==
As of October 2025, this genus includes four species:

- Tapponia auriola Lo, Cheng & Lin, 2024 – Taiwan
- Tapponia micans Simon, 1885 – Malaysia, Indonesia (Sumatra, Borneo) (type species)
- Tapponia parva Lo, Cheng & Lin, 2024 – Taiwan
- Tapponia rarobulbus Lo, Cheng & Lin, 2024 – Taiwan
