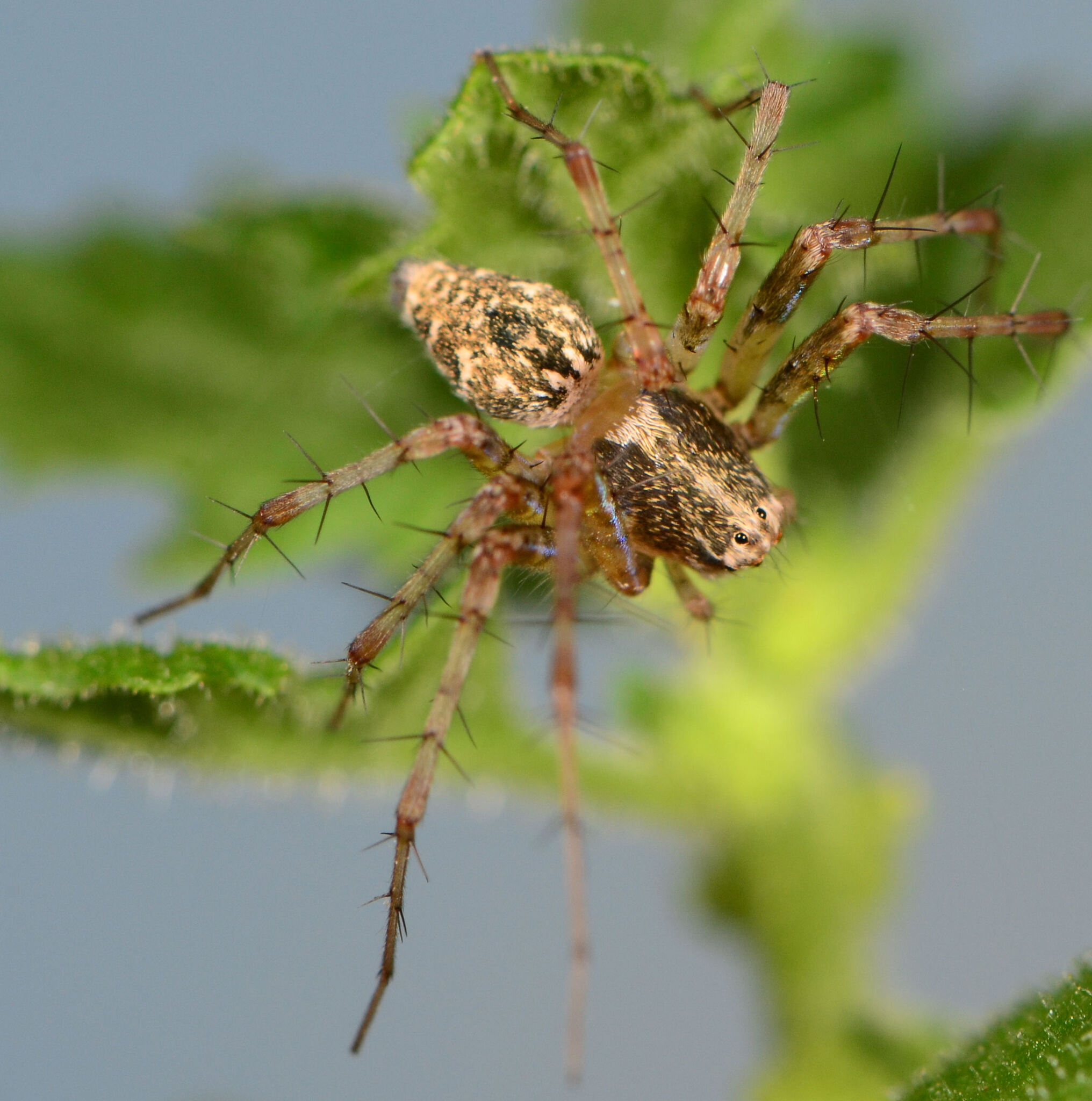
- female
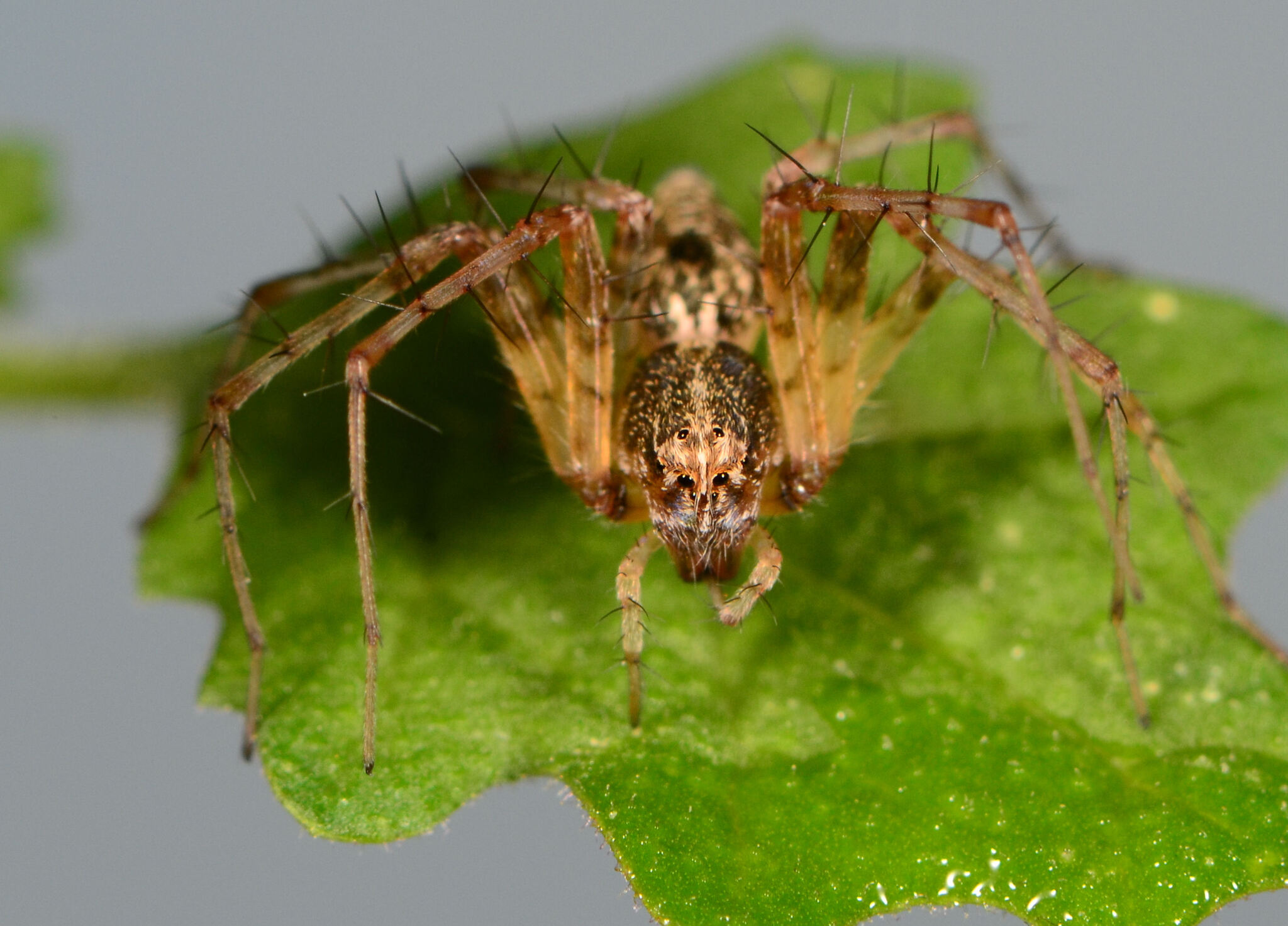
- female

Scientific classification
- Kingdom: Animalia
- Phylum: Arthropoda
- Subphylum: Chelicerata
- Class: Arachnida
- Order: Araneae
- Infraorder: Araneomorphae
- Family: Oxyopidae
- Genus: Oxyopes
- Species: O. bedoti

Binomial name
- Oxyopes bedoti Lessert, 1915

= Oxyopes bedoti =

Bedoti's Lynx Spider

Species of spider

Oxyopes bedoti is a species of spider in the family Oxyopidae. It is commonly known as Bedoti's lynx spider.

== Distribution ==
Oxyopes bedoti occurs in Tanzania and South Africa. In South Africa, the species has been recorded from two provinces at altitudes ranging from 557 to 1,310 m above sea level.

== Habitat and ecology ==
The species is commonly found on grasses in the Savanna biome. It has been sampled from various localities within its range and appears to be well-established in suitable habitat.

== Description ==
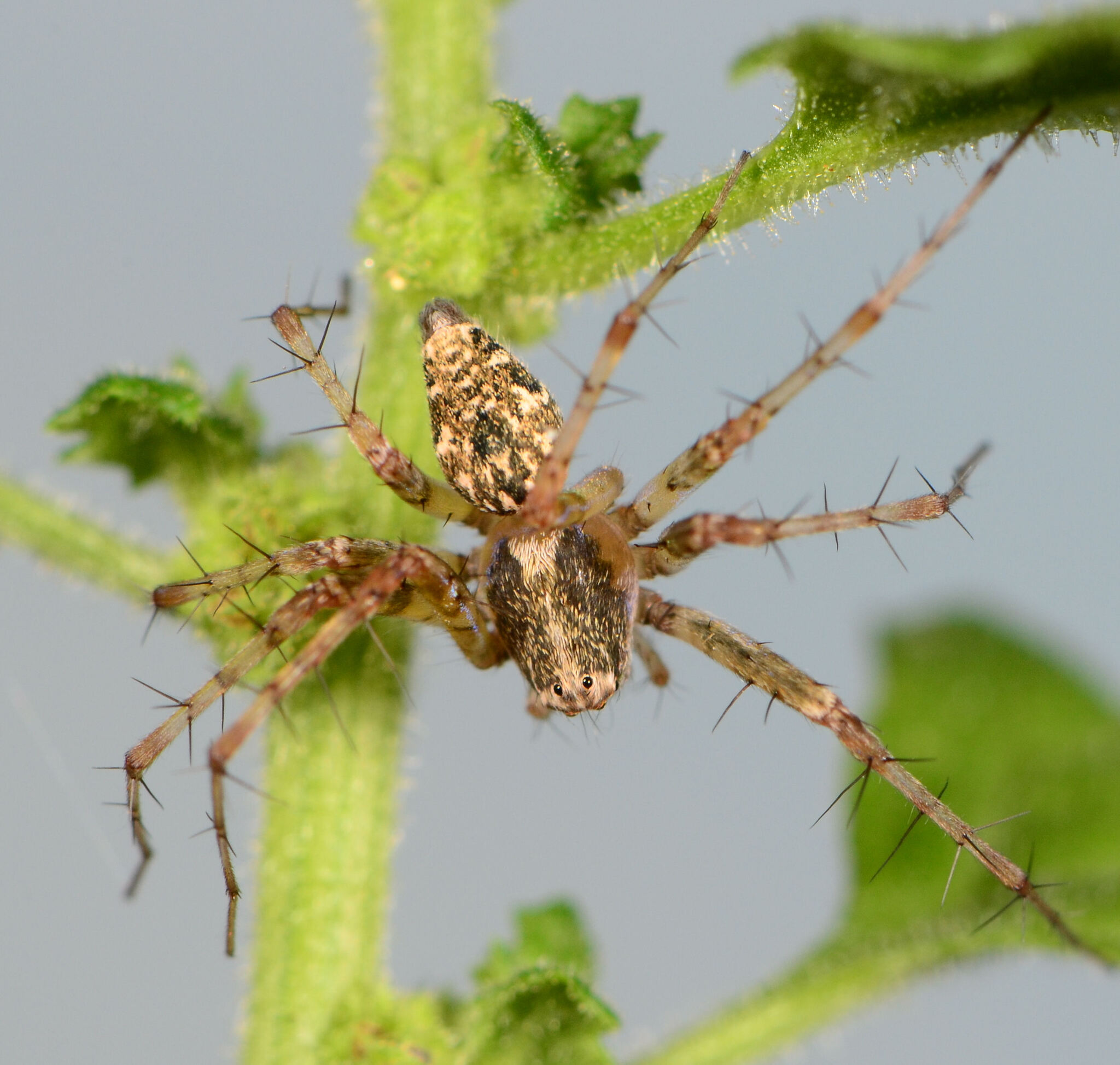
female

Oxyopes bedoti is known only from females. Like other lynx spiders, it exhibits the characteristic features of the genus including long, slender legs with prominent spines and a tapering opisthosoma.

== Conservation ==
Oxyopes bedoti is listed as Least Concern by the South African National Biodiversity Institute despite being known only from one sex, due to its wide geographical range. The species is protected in multiple protected areas including Polokwane Nature Reserve, Blouberg Nature Reserve, Ben Lavin Nature Reserve, and Lekgalameetse Nature Reserve.
