= Hostus =

Scientific classification
- Kingdom: Animalia
- Phylum: Arthropoda
- Subphylum: Chelicerata
- Class: Arachnida
- Order: Araneae
- Infraorder: Araneomorphae
- Family: Oxyopidae
- Genus: Hostus; Simon, 1898
- Species: H. paroculus

Binomial name
- Hostus paroculus Simon, 1898

Genus of spiders

Hostus is a monotypic genus of Malagasy lynx spiders containing the single species, Hostus paroculus. It was first described by Eugène Louis Simon in 1898, and is only found on Madagascar.
