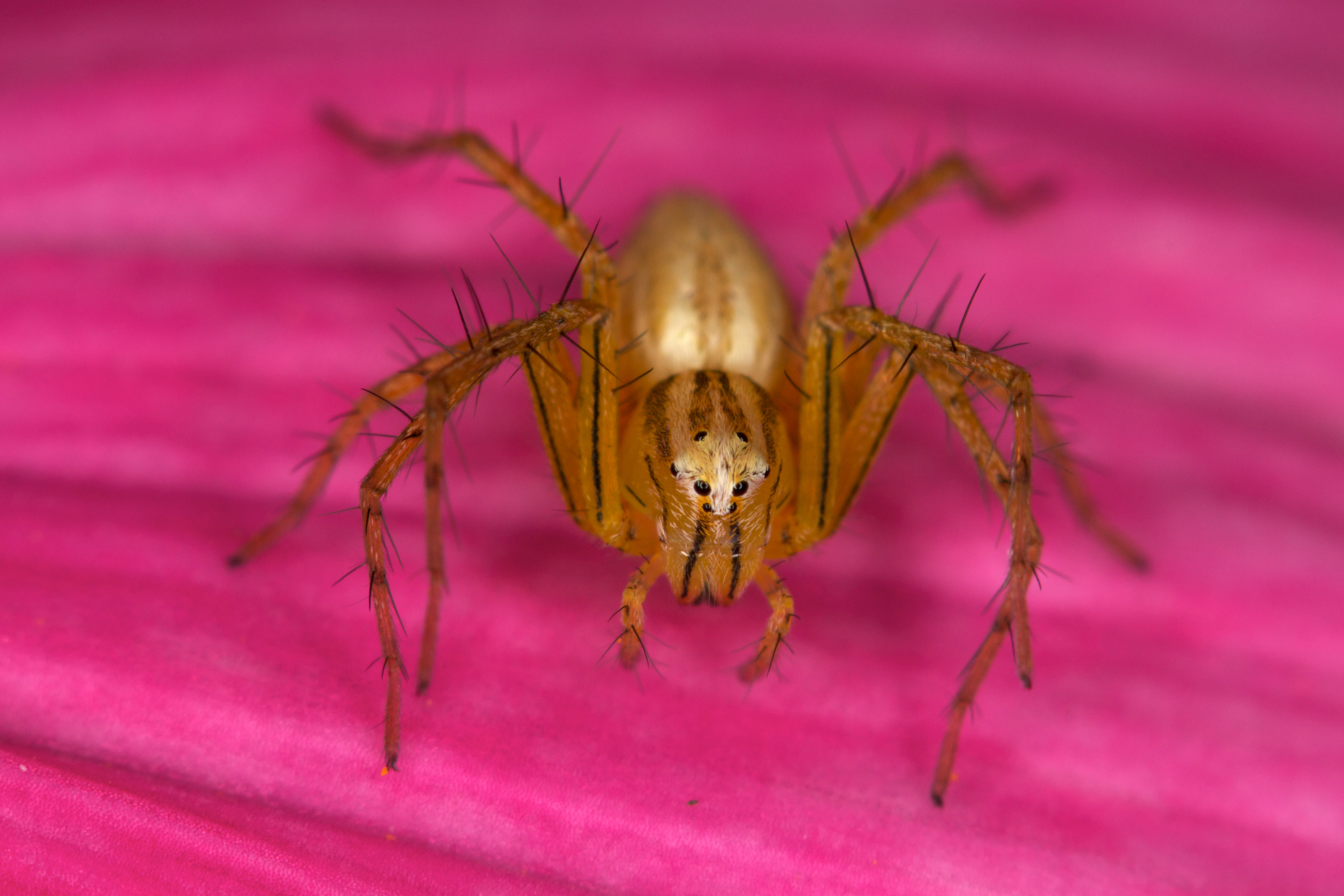

Scientific classification
- Kingdom: Animalia
- Phylum: Arthropoda
- Subphylum: Chelicerata
- Class: Arachnida
- Order: Araneae
- Infraorder: Araneomorphae
- Family: Oxyopidae
- Genus: Oxyopes
- Species: O. elegans

Binomial name
- Oxyopes elegans L. Koch, 1878

= Oxyopes elegans =

Species of spider

Oxyopes elegans is a species of lynx spiders (family Oxyopidae) found in Queensland and New South Wales.
