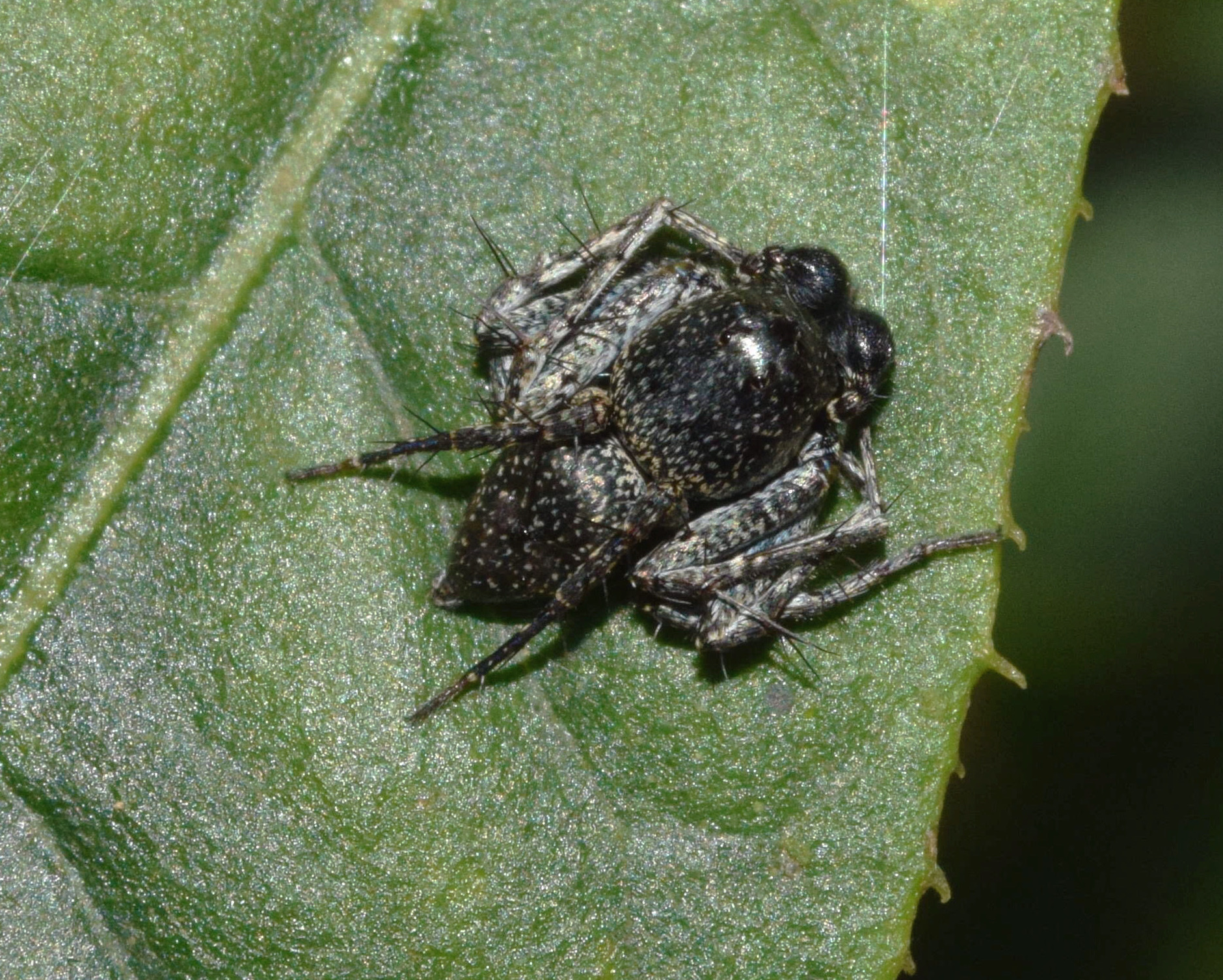

Scientific classification
- Kingdom: Animalia
- Phylum: Arthropoda
- Subphylum: Chelicerata
- Class: Arachnida
- Order: Araneae
- Infraorder: Araneomorphae
- Family: Oxyopidae
- Genus: Oxyopes
- Species: O. tuberculatus

Binomial name
- Oxyopes tuberculatus Lessert, 1915

= Oxyopes tuberculatus =

Humpback Lynx Spider

Species of spider

Oxyopes tuberculatus is a species of spider in the family Oxyopidae. It is commonly known as the humpback lynx spider.

== Distribution ==
Oxyopes tuberculatus occurs in Tanzania, Eswatini, and South Africa. In South Africa, the species has been recorded from three provinces.

== Habitat and ecology ==
The species is found in grassy areas across both Grassland and Savanna biomes at altitudes ranging from 93 to 1,310 m above sea level. It appears to be well-adapted to the grassland environments characteristic of these biome types.

== Conservation ==
Oxyopes tuberculatus is listed as Least Concern by the South African National Biodiversity Institute due to its wide geographic range across three countries. The species is protected in multiple protected areas including Tembe Elephant Park, Nylsvley Nature Reserve, Polokwane Nature Reserve, and Malolotja Nature Reserve.
