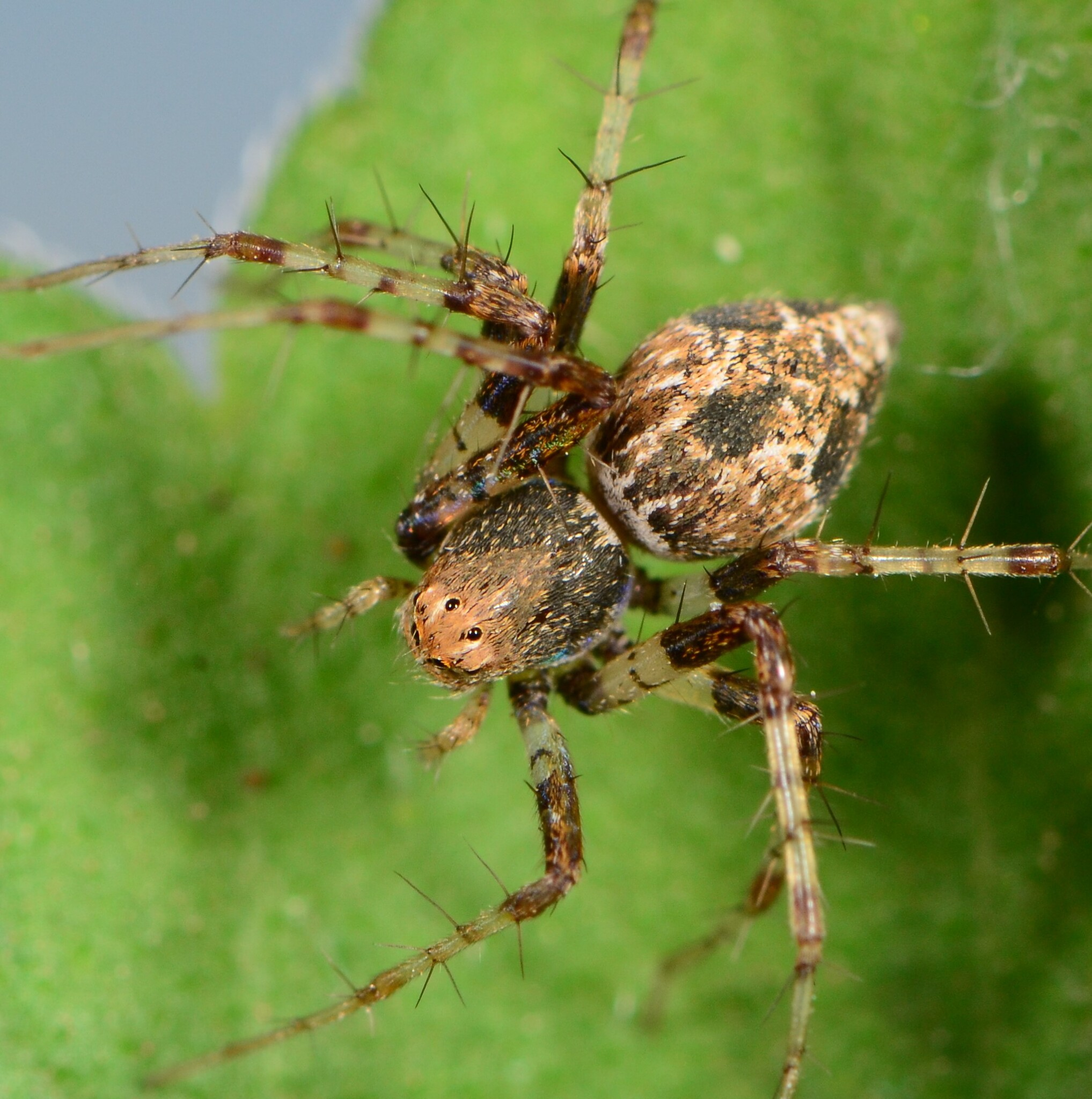
- female
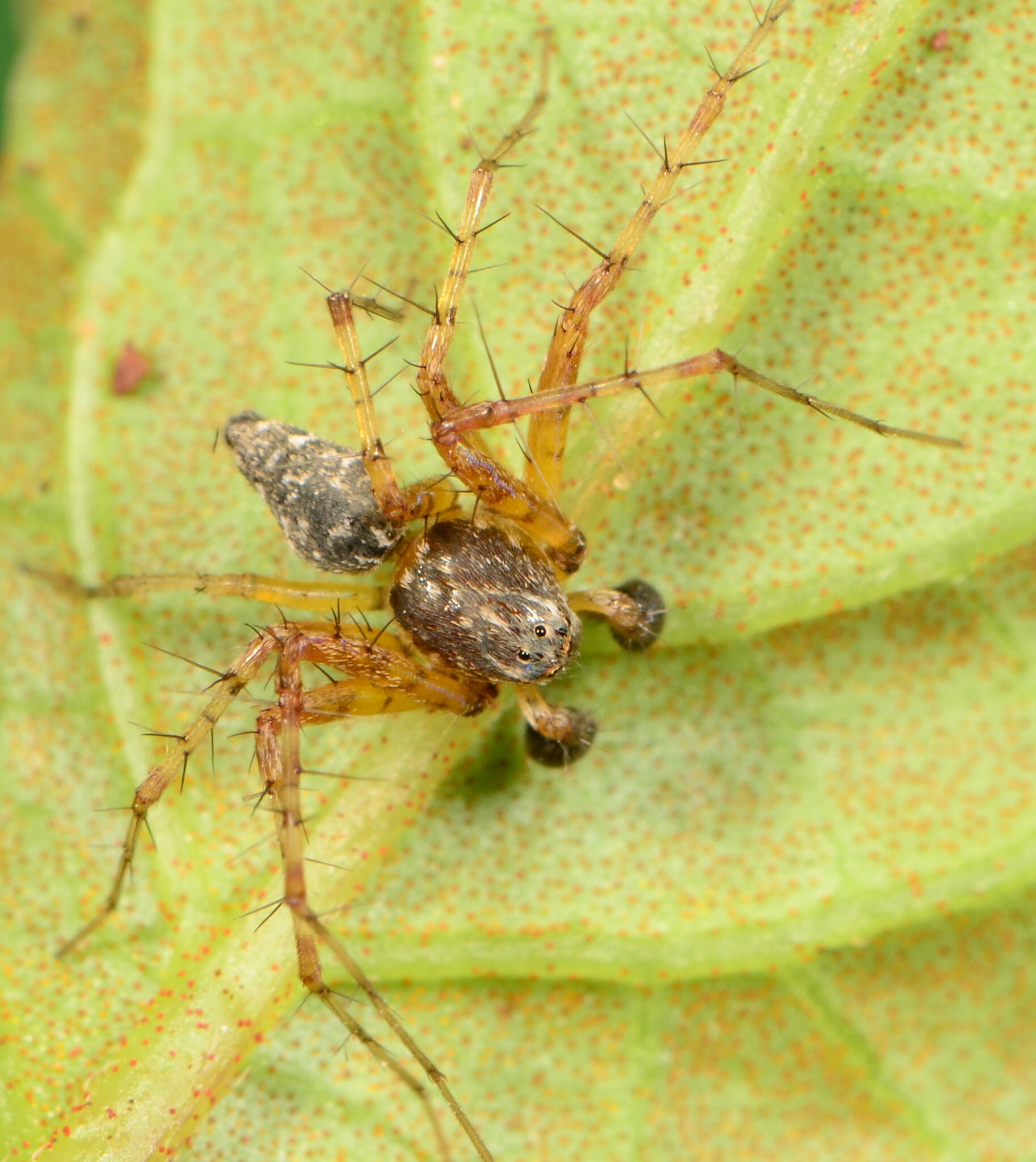
- male

Scientific classification
- Kingdom: Animalia
- Phylum: Arthropoda
- Subphylum: Chelicerata
- Class: Arachnida
- Order: Araneae
- Infraorder: Araneomorphae
- Family: Oxyopidae
- Genus: Oxyopes
- Species: O. uncinatus

Binomial name
- Oxyopes uncinatus Lessert, 1915

= Oxyopes uncinatus =

East African Lynx Spider

Species of spider

Oxyopes uncinatus is a species of spider in the family Oxyopidae. It is commonly known as the East African lynx spider.

== Distribution ==
Oxyopes uncinatus occurs in Tanzania and South Africa. In South Africa, the species has been recorded from two provinces at altitudes ranging from 234 to 586 metres above sea level.

== Habitat and ecology ==
The species has been found on grasses in the Savanna biome. It appears to be adapted to the grassland environments typical of savanna regions.

== Description ==
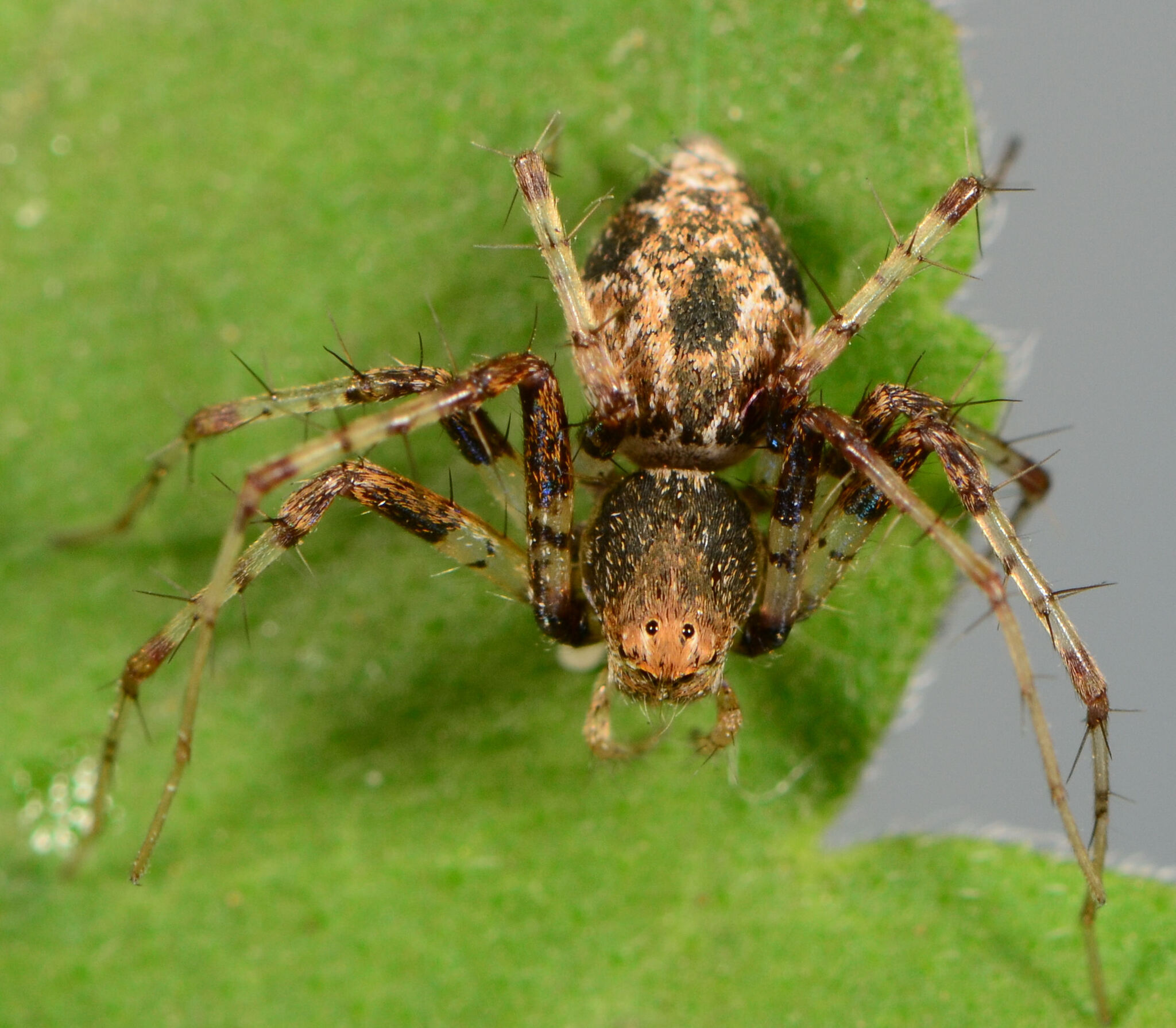
female

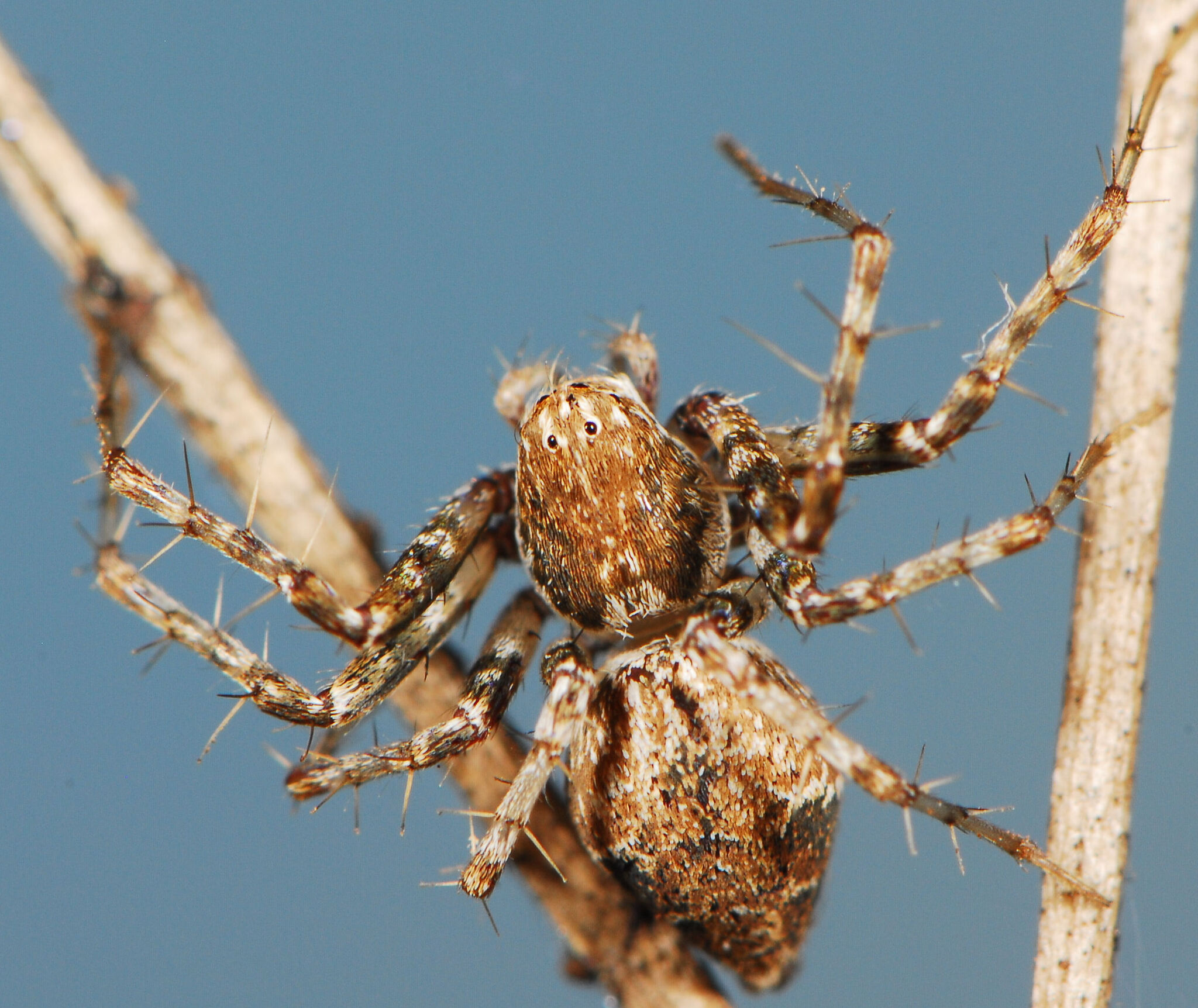
female

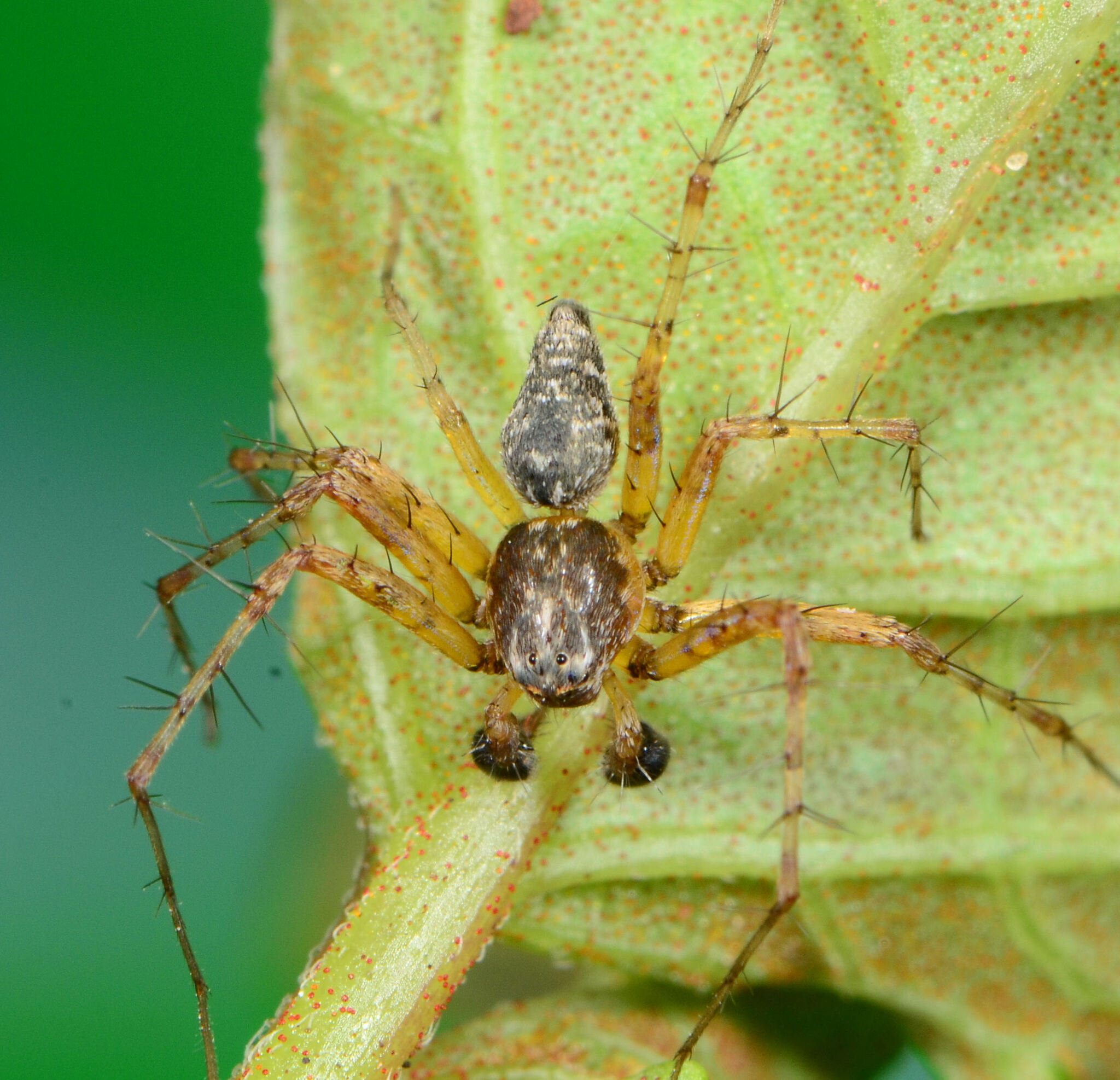
male

== Conservation ==
Oxyopes uncinatus is listed as Least Concern by the South African National Biodiversity Institute due to its wide geographic range across multiple African countries. The species is protected in Kruger National Park and faces no significant threats.

== Taxonomy ==
The species has been the subject of comparative morphological studies, with additional taxonomic work published by Townsend et al. in 2001.
