= Oxyopes angulitarsus =

Long Bodied Lynx Spider

Conservation status
- Least Concern (SANBI Red List)

Scientific classification
- Kingdom: Animalia
- Phylum: Arthropoda
- Subphylum: Chelicerata
- Class: Arachnida
- Order: Araneae
- Infraorder: Araneomorphae
- Family: Oxyopidae
- Genus: Oxyopes
- Species: O. angulitarsus

Binomial name
- Oxyopes angulitarsus Lessert, 1915

Species of spider

Oxyopes angulitarsus is a species of spider in the family Oxyopidae. It is commonly known as the long bodied lynx spider.

== Distribution ==
Oxyopes angulitarsus occurs in Uganda and South Africa. In South Africa, the species has been recorded from three provinces at altitudes ranging from 93 to 1,341 m above sea level.

== Habitat and ecology ==
The species is found in grassy areas within the Savanna biome. It is considered a less common species compared to other Oxyopes in the region and has been sampled primarily from grass in the north-eastern regions.

== Description ==
Oxyopes angulitarsus is known only from males. The opisthosoma is elongated and narrow, approximately twice as long as wide, gradually narrowed posteriorly with lateral edges that are almost straight. It resembles other Oxyopes species with elongate bodies such as O. jacksoni.

== Conservation ==
Oxyopes angulitarsus is listed as Least Concern by the South African National Biodiversity Institute despite being known only from one sex, due to its wide geographical range. The species is protected in three protected areas and faces no significant threats.
