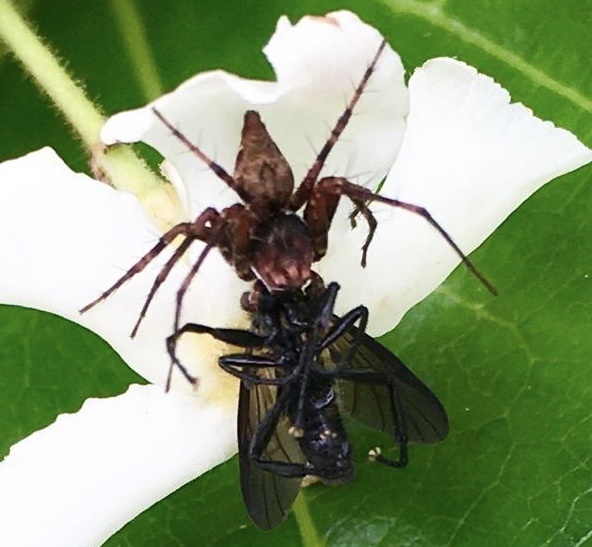

Scientific classification
- Kingdom: Animalia
- Phylum: Arthropoda
- Subphylum: Chelicerata
- Class: Arachnida
- Order: Araneae
- Infraorder: Araneomorphae
- Family: Oxyopidae
- Genus: Oxyopes
- Species: O. personatus

Binomial name
- Oxyopes personatus Simon, 1897

= Oxyopes personatus =

Species of spider

Oxyopes personatus is a species of spider in the family Oxyopidae. It is endemic to South Africa.

== Distribution ==
Oxyopes personatus is known only from South Africa, with the type locality given simply as "South Africa".

== Description ==
Oxyopes personatus is known only from females. The original description indicates a total length of 7 mm, with the carapace and abdomen dark mahogany colored with white and red hairs. The abdomen is broad with a large spot on each side. The sternum is black with white pubescence, and the legs are dark with whitish hairs and transparent spines.

== Conservation ==
Oxyopes personatus is listed as Data Deficient for taxonomic reasons. The status of the species remains unclear, and additional sampling is needed to collect males and determine the species' actual range. Threats to this species are unknown due to the lack of ecological information.

== Taxonomy ==
The species has not undergone taxonomic revision since its original description in 1897. The lack of male specimens and detailed illustrations makes taxonomic assessment challenging. The status of the species remains uncertain and requires further investigation.
