= Oxyopes galla =

Ethiopian Lynx Spider

Conservation status
- Least Concern (SANBI Red List)

Scientific classification
- Kingdom: Animalia
- Phylum: Arthropoda
- Subphylum: Chelicerata
- Class: Arachnida
- Order: Araneae
- Infraorder: Araneomorphae
- Family: Oxyopidae
- Genus: Oxyopes
- Species: O. galla

Binomial name
- Oxyopes galla Caporiacco, 1941

Species of spider

Oxyopes galla is a species of spider in the family Oxyopidae. It is commonly known as the Ethiopian lynx spider.

== Distribution ==
Oxyopes galla occurs in Ethiopia, Namibia, and South Africa. In South Africa, the species is known only from a single locality in Mpumalanga at 674 m above sea level.

== Habitat and ecology ==
The species is found in grassy areas within the Savanna biome. Due to limited collection records, more research is needed to fully understand its ecological preferences and habitat requirements.

== Description ==
Oxyopes galla is known only from females.

== Conservation ==
Oxyopes galla is listed as Least Concern by the South African National Biodiversity Institute due to its wide range across Africa. Despite the limited South African records, the species' presence in multiple African countries suggests it may be under-collected rather than truly rare.
