= Oxyopes chapini =

Chapini's Lynx Spider

Conservation status
- Least Concern (SANBI Red List)

Scientific classification
- Kingdom: Animalia
- Phylum: Arthropoda
- Subphylum: Chelicerata
- Class: Arachnida
- Order: Araneae
- Infraorder: Araneomorphae
- Family: Oxyopidae
- Genus: Oxyopes
- Species: O. chapini

Binomial name
- Oxyopes chapini Lessert, 1927

Species of spider

Oxyopes chapini is a species of spider in the family Oxyopidae. It is commonly known as Chapini's lynx spider.

== Distribution ==
Oxyopes chapini occurs in the Democratic Republic of the Congo, Namibia, and South Africa. In South Africa, the species is known only from KwaZulu-Natal at 54 m above sea level.

== Habitat and ecology ==
The species has been found on grasses and collected using pitfall traps in the Savanna biome. Its collection methods suggest it may be active both on vegetation and on the ground.

== Description ==
Oxyopes chapini is known only from females.

== Conservation ==
Oxyopes chapini is listed as Least Concern by the South African National Biodiversity Institute due to its wide geographical range across Africa. In South Africa, the species is protected in Mkuze Game Reserve.
