= Oxyopes acleistus =

Scientific classification
- Kingdom: Animalia
- Phylum: Arthropoda
- Subphylum: Chelicerata
- Class: Arachnida
- Order: Araneae
- Infraorder: Araneomorphae
- Family: Oxyopidae
- Genus: Oxyopes
- Species: O. acleistus

Binomial name
- Oxyopes acleistus Chamberlin, 1929

Species of spider

Oxyopes acleistus is a species of lynx spider in the family Oxyopidae. It is found in the United States and Mexico.
