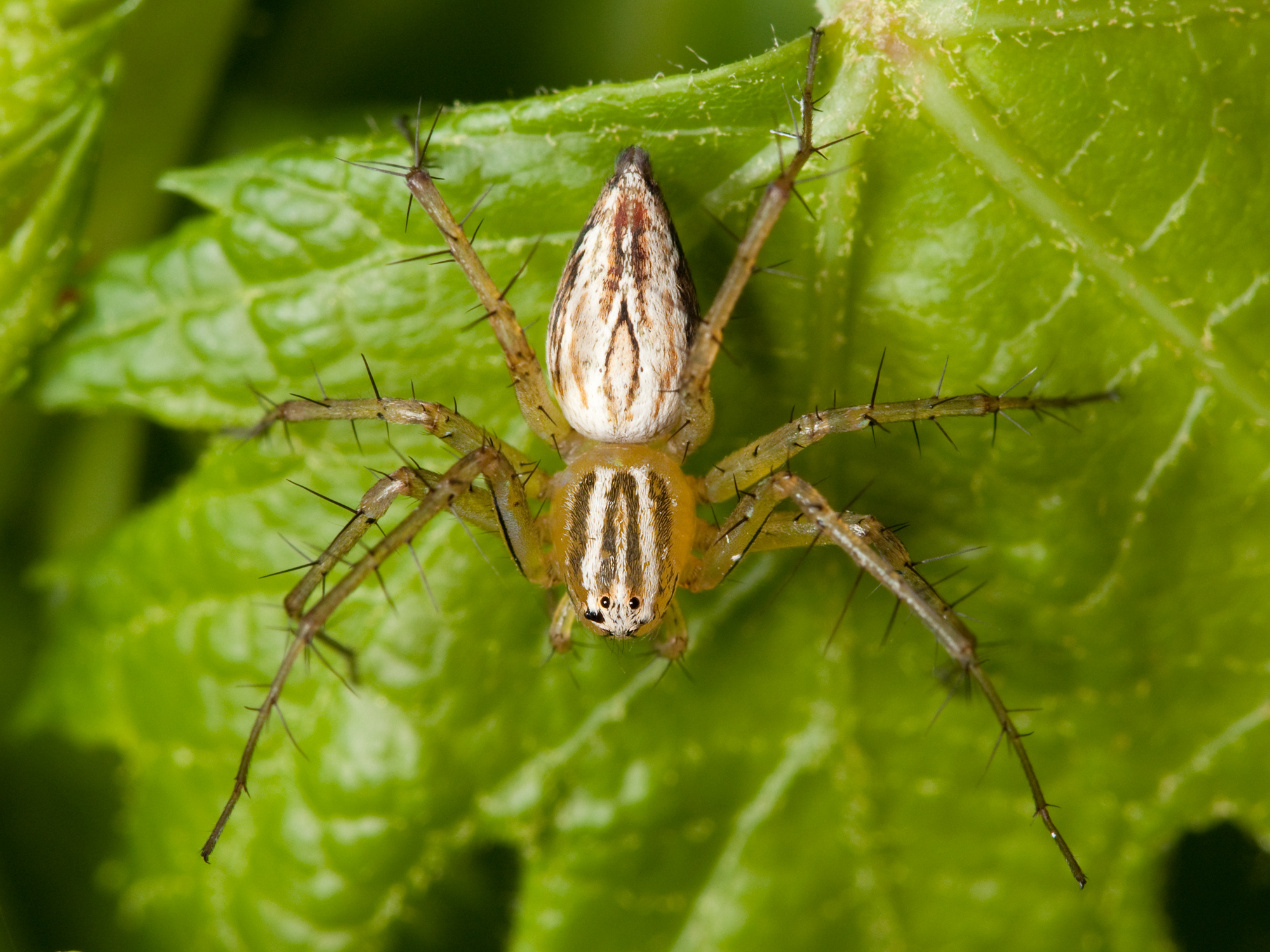
- Female O. salticus from Nashville, Tennessee
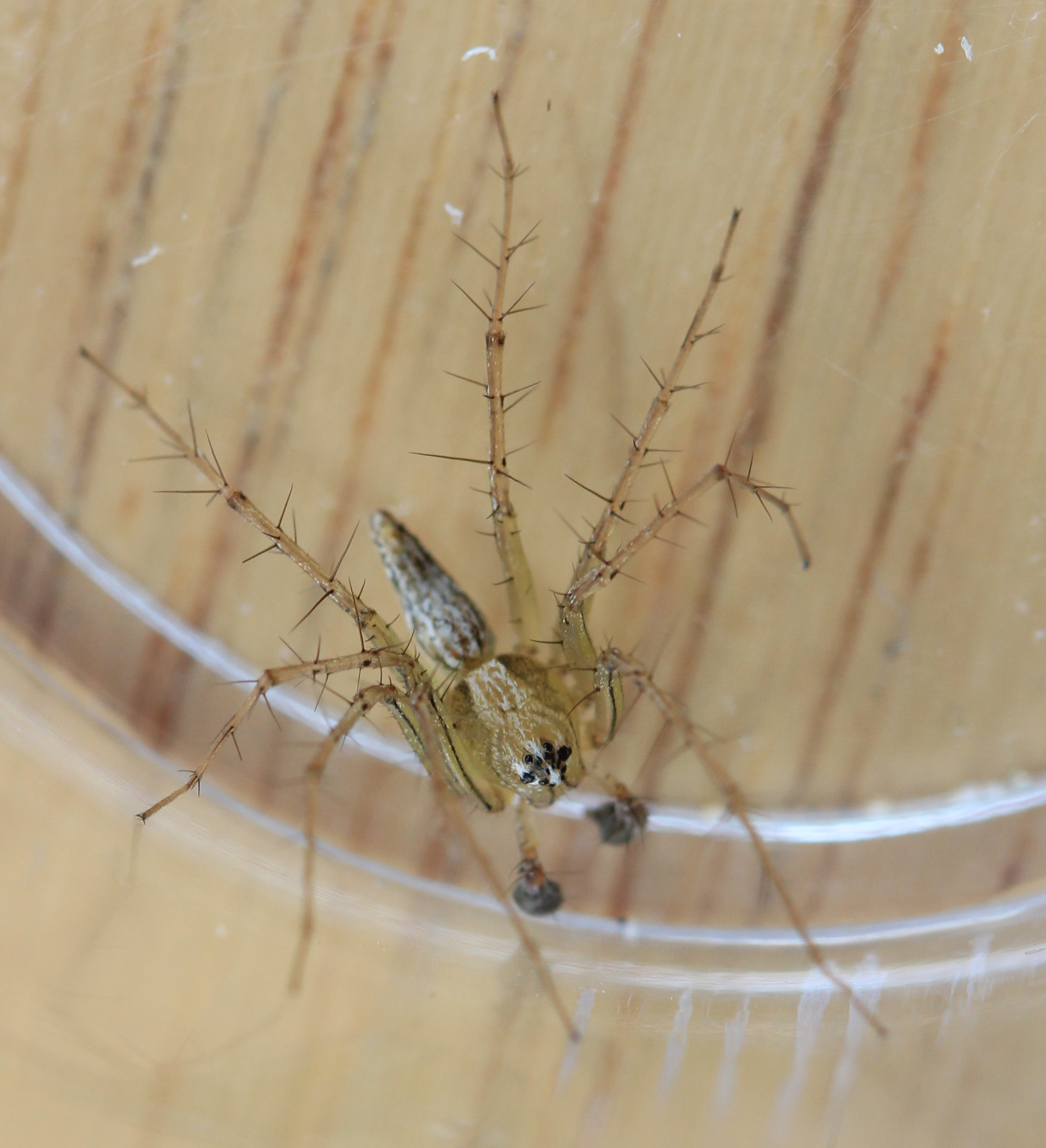
- Male O. salticus from Hilo, Hawaii

Scientific classification
- Kingdom: Animalia
- Phylum: Arthropoda
- Subphylum: Chelicerata
- Class: Arachnida
- Order: Araneae
- Infraorder: Araneomorphae
- Family: Oxyopidae
- Genus: Oxyopes
- Species: O. salticus

Binomial name
- Oxyopes salticus (Hentz, 1845)

Synonyms
- O.astutus; O. gracilis

= Oxyopes salticus =

Species of spider

Oxyopes salticus is a species of lynx spider, commonly known as the striped lynx spider, first described by Hentz in 1845. Its habitat tends to be grasses and leafy vegetation; grassy, weedy fields, and row crops.

== Description ==
Adult specimens have some color variation between orange, cream and brown. Adult females typically have stripes on both the carapace and abdomen, though on many specimens, the stripes are more pronounced on the abdomen. There is a generally a diamond cardiac mark, and macrosetae covering legs I-IV. There is a broad clypeus. Adult females range in size from ~5-6mm, and adult males range in size ~4-5mm.

== Range ==
Eastern United States from Massachusetts and Iowa south to Florida and Texas, along Mexican border, north along Pacific coast to Oregon. Also much of South and Central America Recently, O.salticus has been found in great numbers on the Big Island of Hawai'i as well as the island of Maui (see picture to the right).

== Agricultural importance ==
A number of authors (Brady 1964, Laster and Brazzel 1968, McDaniel et al. 1981, Young and Lockley 1985) have noted the importance of Oxyopids as a major predator of economically important agricultural pests. In 1961, Kayashima released 45,000 O. sertatus spiders into a Cryptomeria forest in Japan (in a test plot) and noted a 53% reduction in damage by the gall midge Contarinia inouyei. Other studies in India (Sharma & Sarup, 1979; Rao et al., 1981) have noted similar results. However, some studies note that O. salticus (and other Oxyopids) also prey on beneficial insects (e.g., bees and other pollinators), so their importance in pest control is somewhat questioned.

== Gallery ==
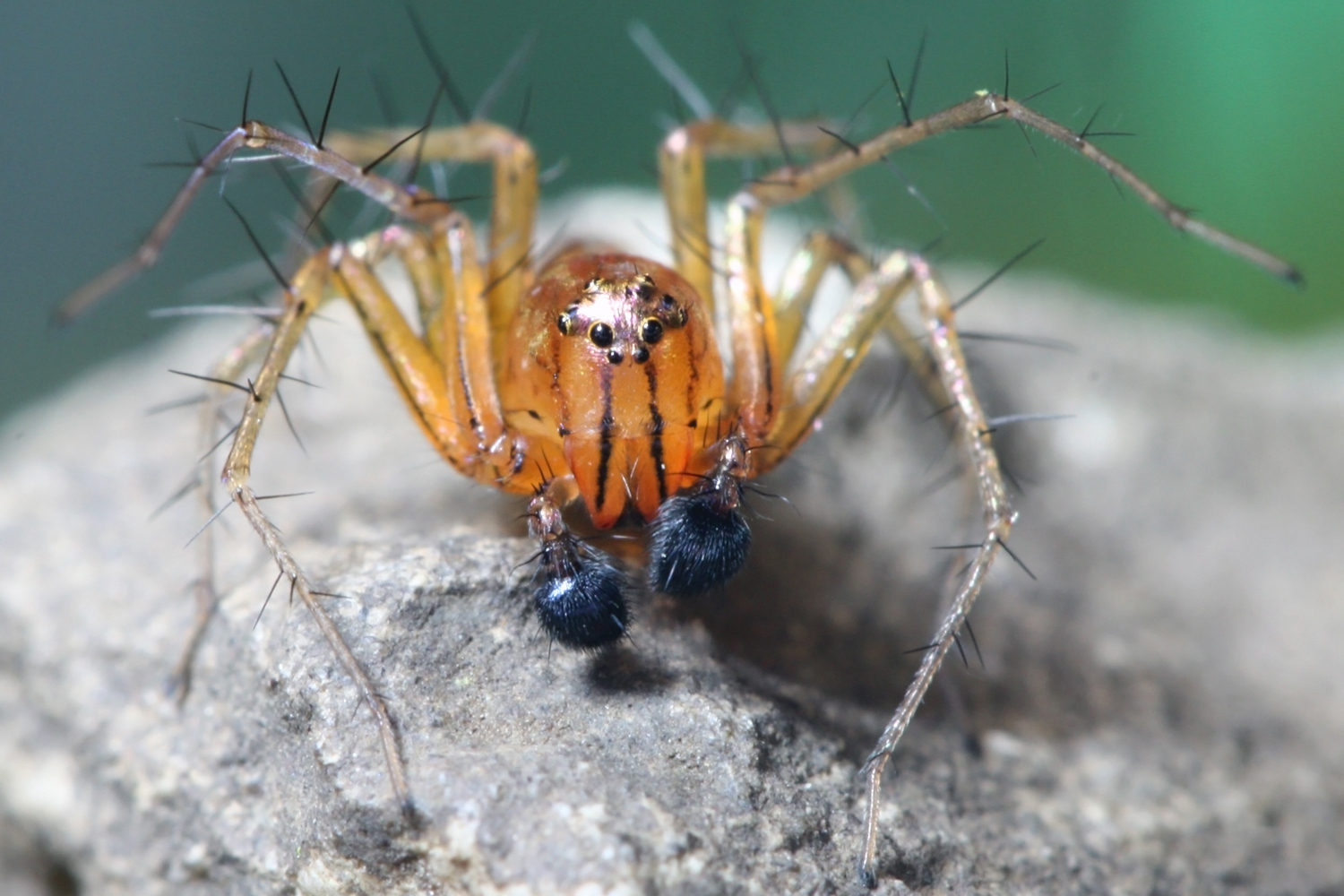
O. salticus male.

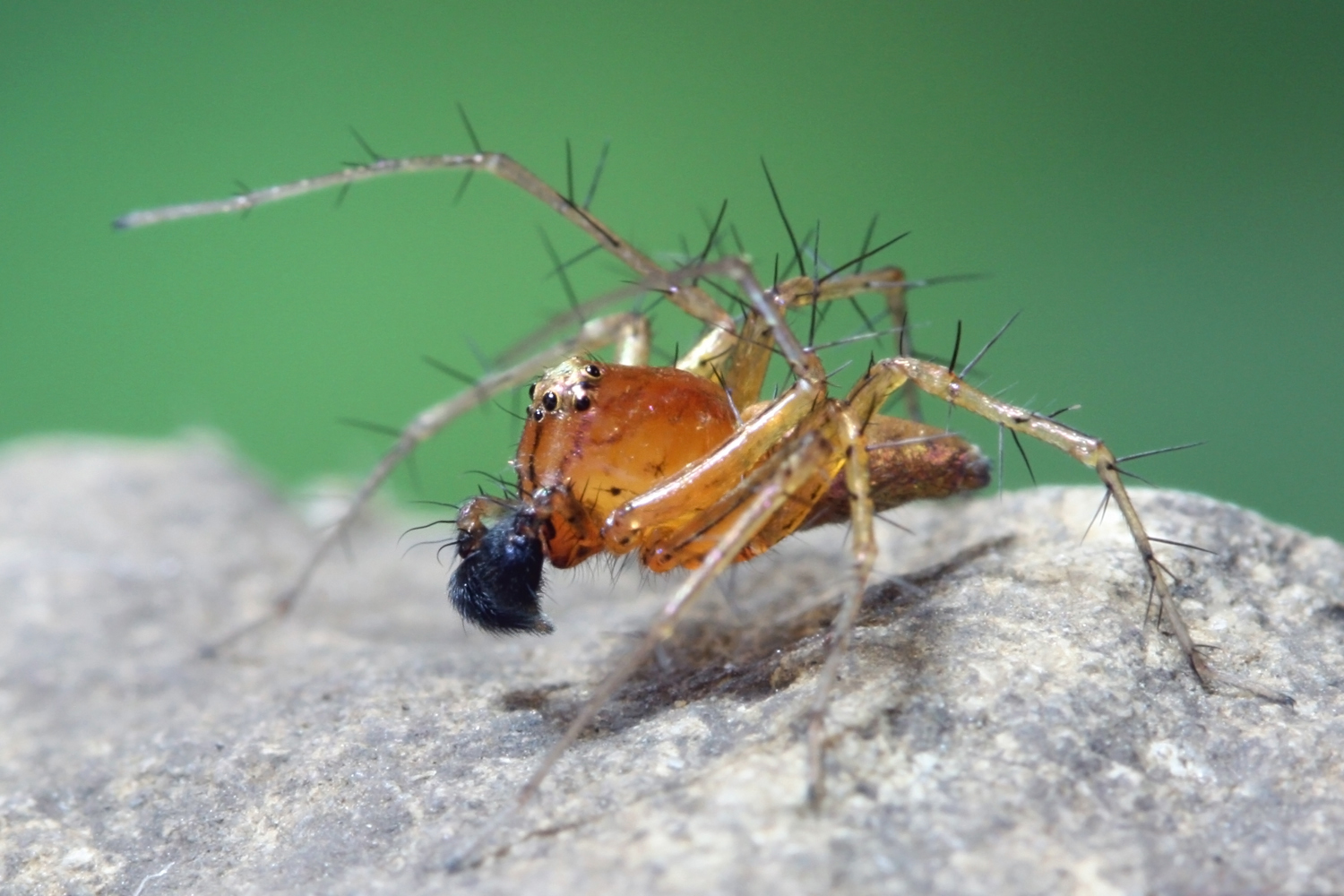
O. salticus male (oblique)

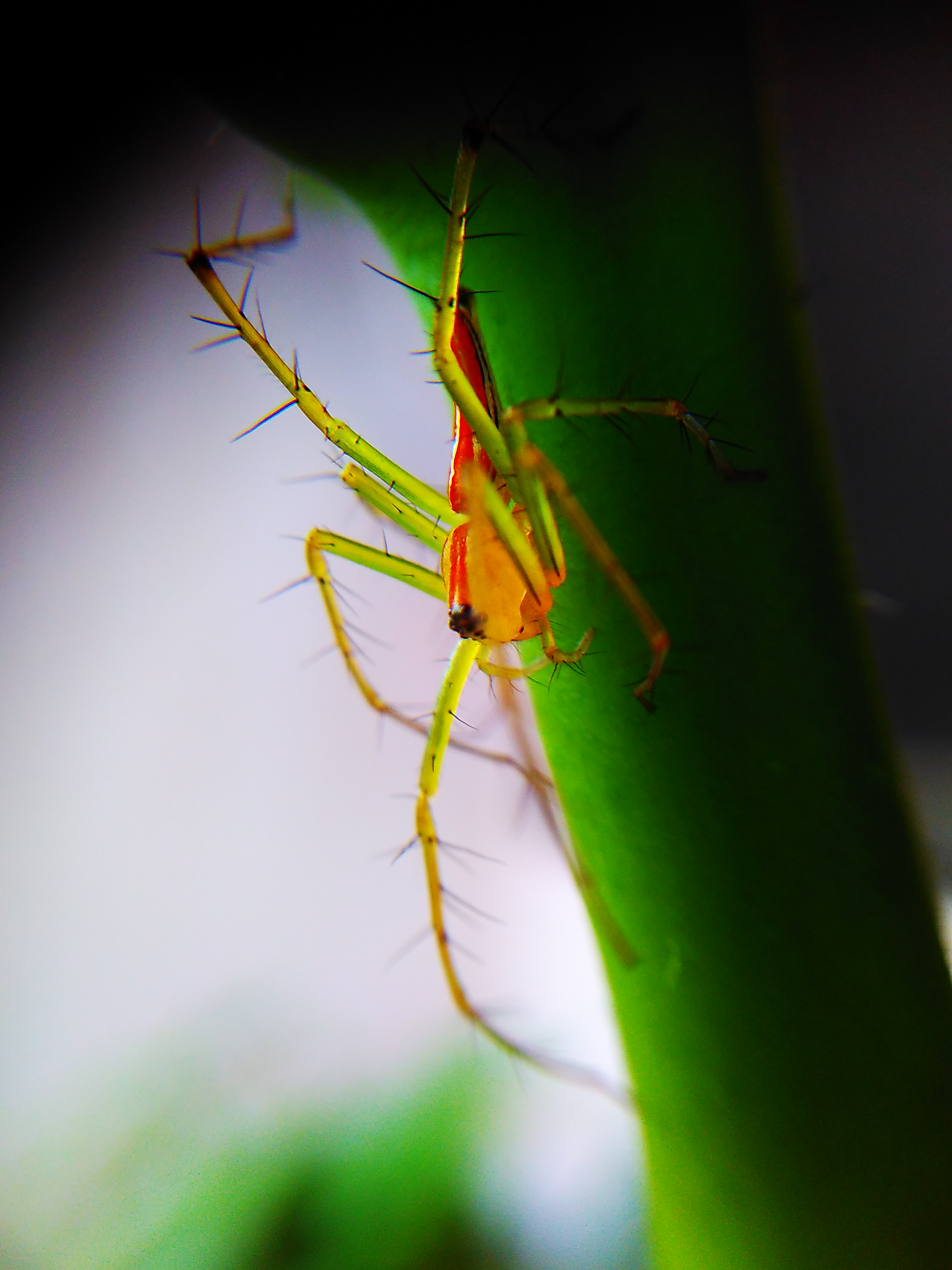
on Okra stem

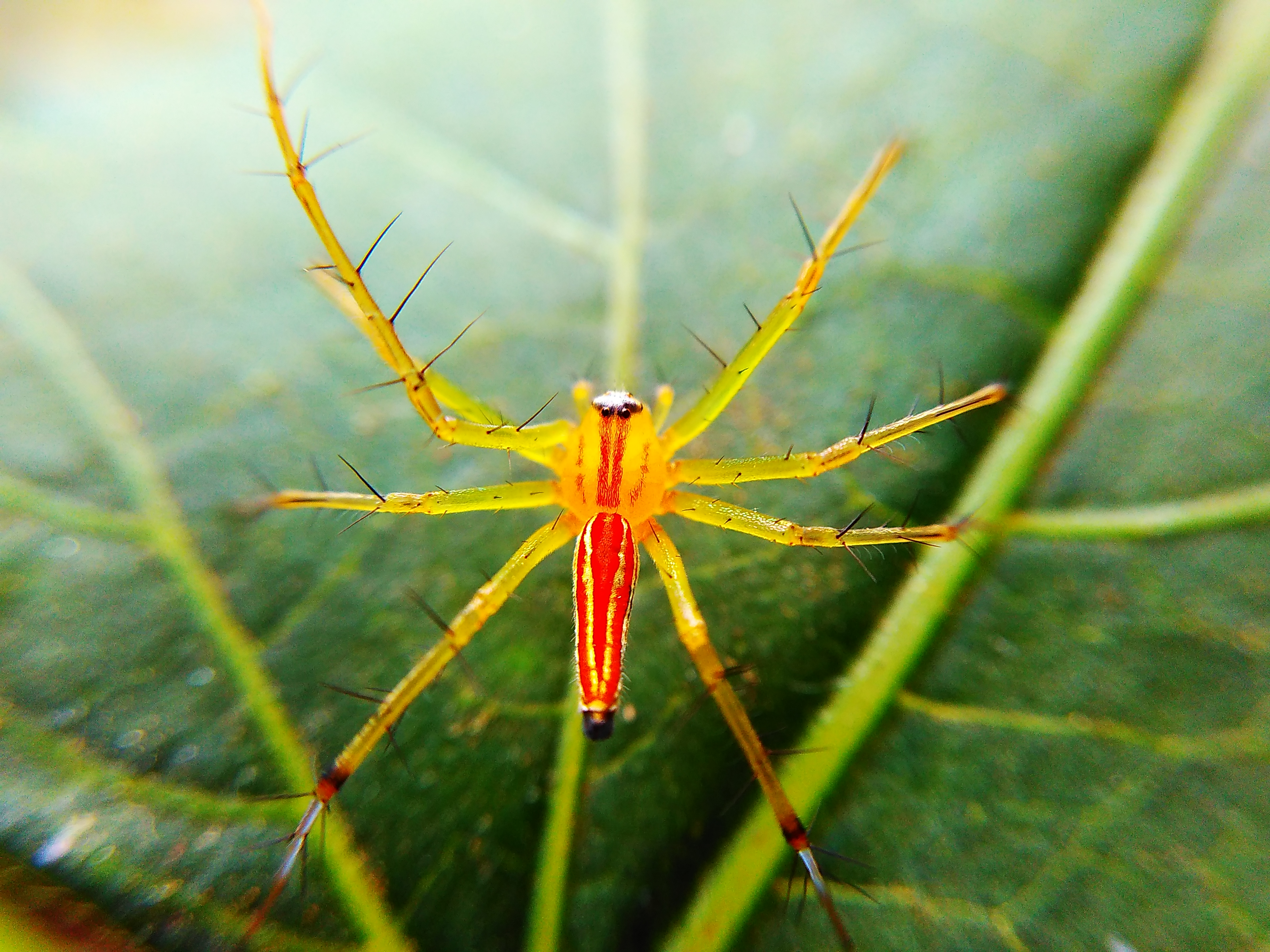
on Okra leaf

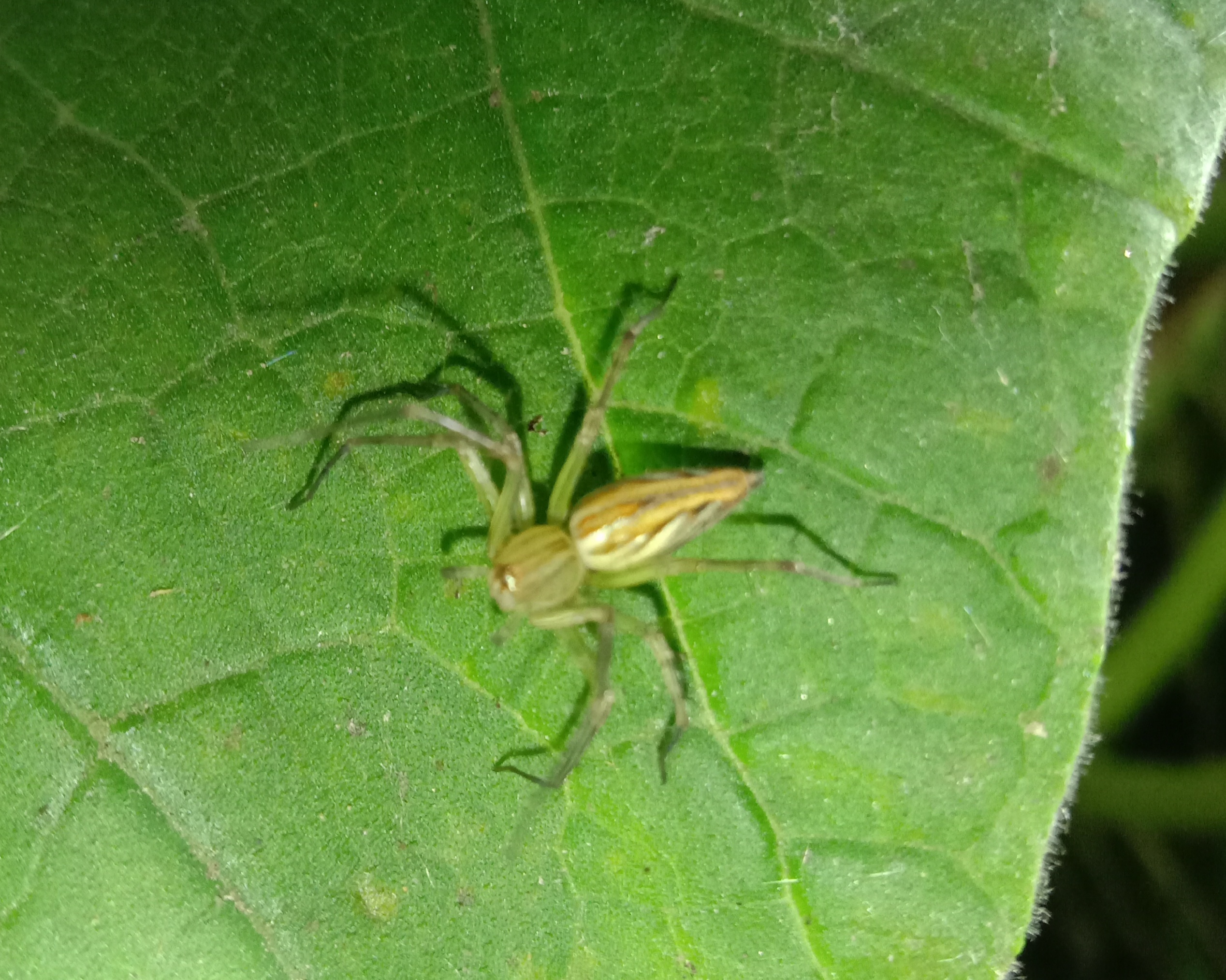
Captured at night
