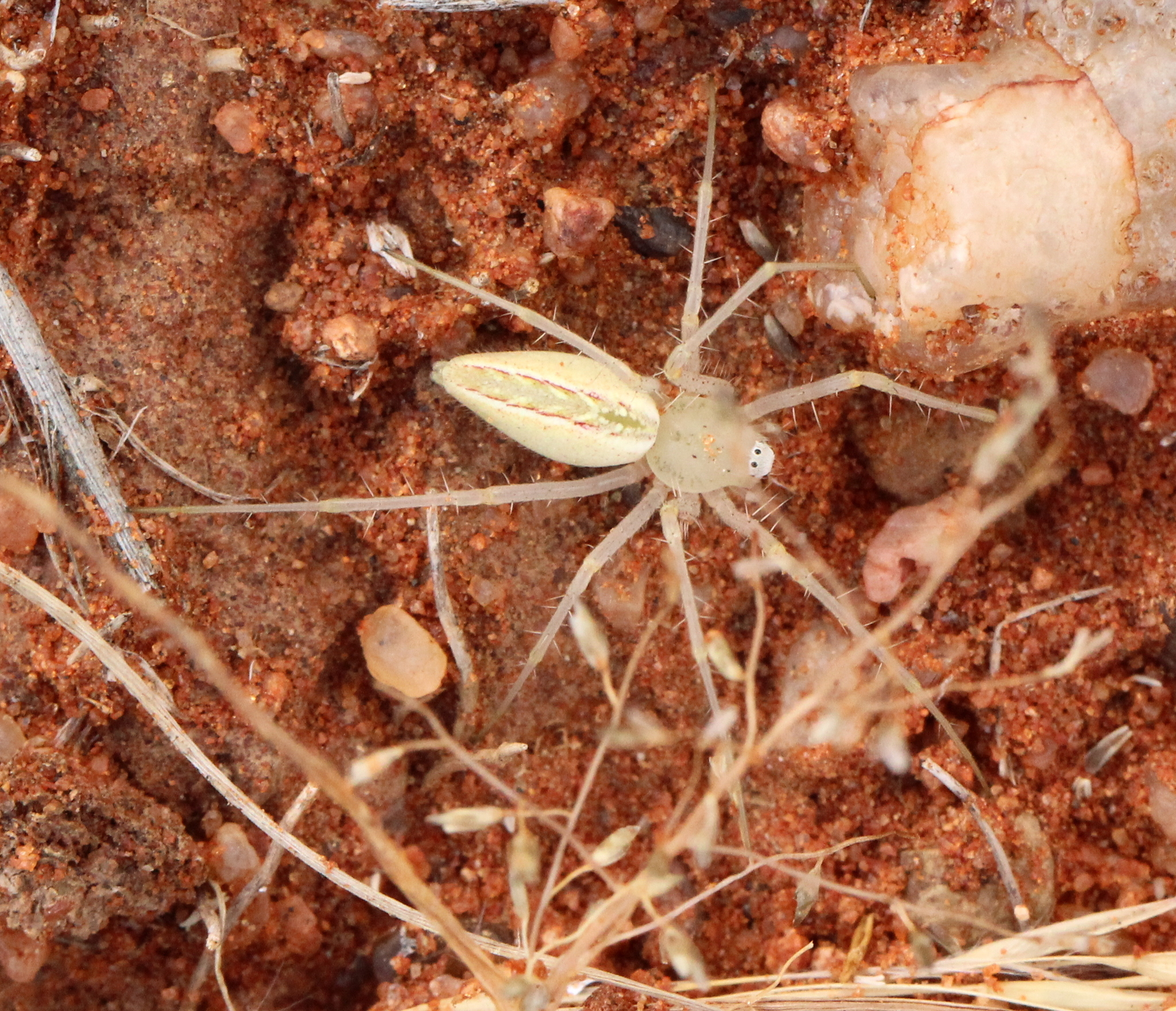

Scientific classification
- Kingdom: Animalia
- Phylum: Arthropoda
- Subphylum: Chelicerata
- Class: Arachnida
- Order: Araneae
- Infraorder: Araneomorphae
- Family: Oxyopidae
- Genus: Peucetia
- Species: P. crucifera

Binomial name
- Peucetia crucifera Lawrence, 1927

= Peucetia crucifera =

Namibia Green Lynx Spider

Species of spider

Peucetia crucifera is a species of spider in the family Oxyopidae. It is endemic to southern Africa and is commonly known as the Namibia green lynx spider.

== Distribution ==
Peucetia crucifera has a wide distribution across southern Africa, occurring in Namibia, Botswana, Zimbabwe, and South Africa. In South Africa, the species is recorded from four provinces: Limpopo, Mpumalanga, Northern Cape, and Western Cape.

== Habitat and ecology ==
The species inhabits multiple biomes including Grassland, Nama Karoo, and Savanna biomes at altitudes ranging from 263 to 1,412 m above sea level.

Peucetia crucifera is a free-living plant dweller that occurs on vegetation.

== Description ==
Peucetia crucifera is known from both sexes. The species is characterized by the absence of clypeal lines, which distinguishes it from several other Peucetia species. Like other green lynx spiders, it is a medium to large-sized spider with a bright green coloration and long, slender legs with prominent spines.

== Conservation ==
Peucetia crucifera is listed as Least Concern by the South African National Biodiversity Institute due to its wide distribution range across southern Africa. The species is protected in several protected areas including Blouberg Nature Reserve, Kruger National Park, Augrabies National Park, and Karoo National Park.

== Taxonomy ==
The species was originally described by R. F. Lawrence in 1927. A revision of the Afrotropical species of Peucetia was conducted by van Niekerk and Dippenaar-Schoeman in 1994.
