= Peucetia elegans =

Scientific classification
- Domain: Eukaryota
- Kingdom: Animalia
- Phylum: Arthropoda
- Subphylum: Chelicerata
- Class: Arachnida
- Order: Araneae
- Infraorder: Araneomorphae
- Family: Oxyopidae
- Genus: Peucetia
- Species: P. elegans

Binomial name
- Peucetia elegans (Blackwall, 1864)

Synonyms
- Pasithea elegans Blackwall, 1864

Species of spider

Peucetia elegans is a species of lynx spiders that is found in East India.

== Description ==
This lynx spider has been described as having three rows of uneven sized eyes which are encircled with yellow hairs. The abdomen is somewhat long, heart-shaped, and tapering toward the spinneret. The entire body is covered with dense brightly colored hairs. Defined by a large black band which extends along the center of abdomen.

== Sources ==
- Peucetia elegans at the World Spider Catalog
