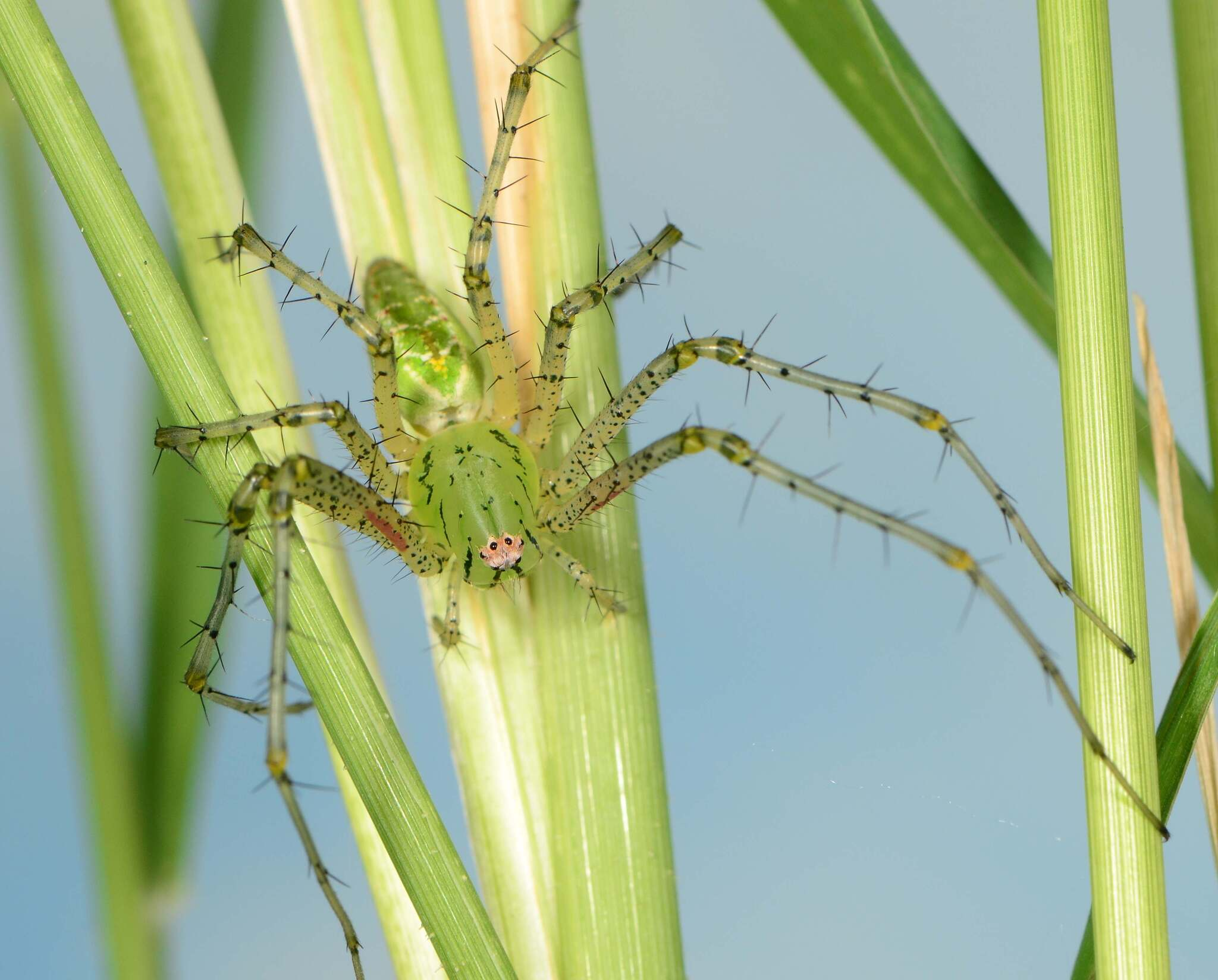
- female
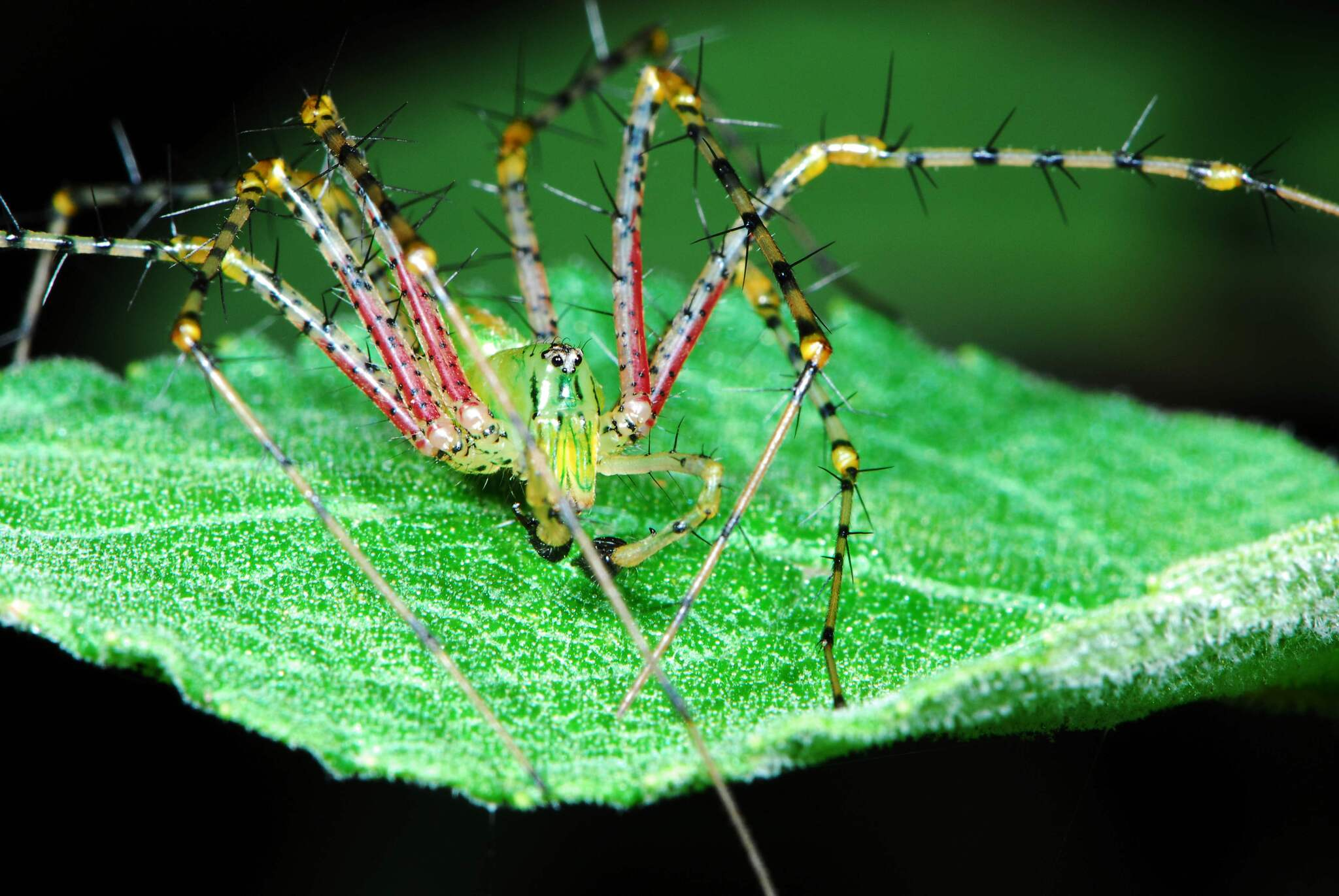
- male

Scientific classification
- Kingdom: Animalia
- Phylum: Arthropoda
- Subphylum: Chelicerata
- Class: Arachnida
- Order: Araneae
- Infraorder: Araneomorphae
- Family: Oxyopidae
- Genus: Peucetia
- Species: P. striata

Binomial name
- Peucetia striata Karsch, 1878

Synonyms
- Pasithea foliifera Butler, 1879; Peucetia fasciiventris Simon, 1890; Peucetia rubrosignata Strand, 1906; Peucetia fasciiventris longistriga Strand, 1913; Peucetia striata kibonotensis Lessert, 1915; Peucetia kunenensis Lawrence, 1927

= Peucetia striata =

Decorated Green Lynx Spider

Species of spider

Peucetia striata is a species of spider in the family Oxyopidae. It has a wide distribution from Yemen to South Africa and nearby islands, and is commonly known as the decorated green lynx spider.

== Distribution ==
Peucetia striata has an extensive distribution from Yemen to South Africa, and also occurs in the Comoros and has been introduced to Saint Helena. In South Africa, the species is recorded from eight provinces across a wide range of habitats.

== Habitat and ecology ==
The species inhabits multiple biomes including Fynbos, Grassland, Nama Karoo, and Savanna biomes at altitudes ranging from 7 to 1,758 m above sea level.

Peucetia striata is a free-living plant dweller that occurs on vegetation. The species has also been sampled from pistachio orchards.

== Description ==
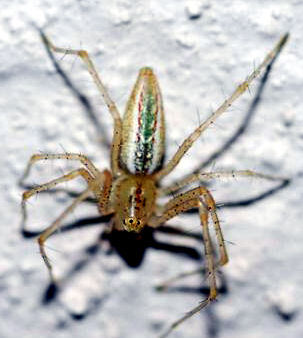
female

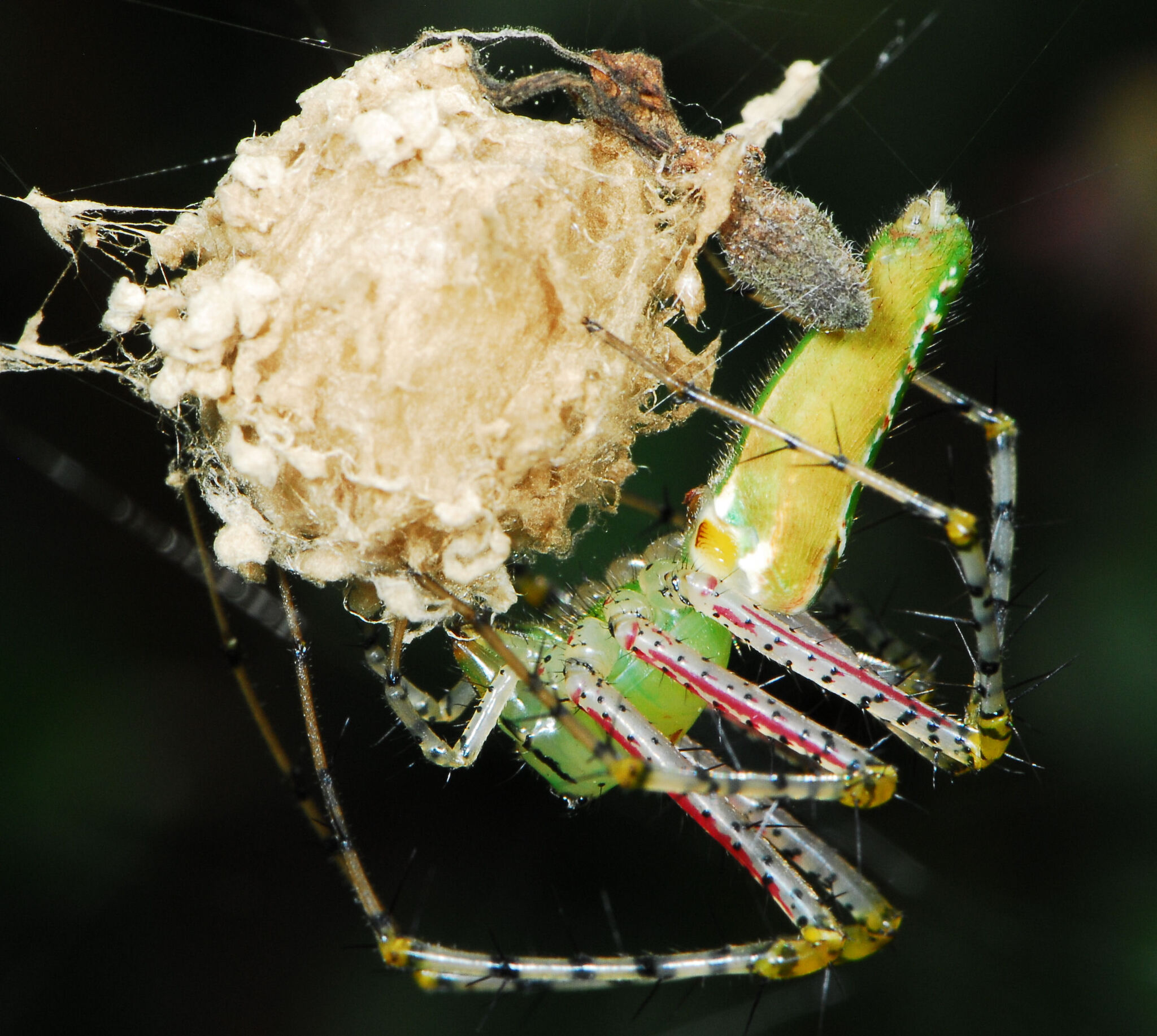
female with egg sac

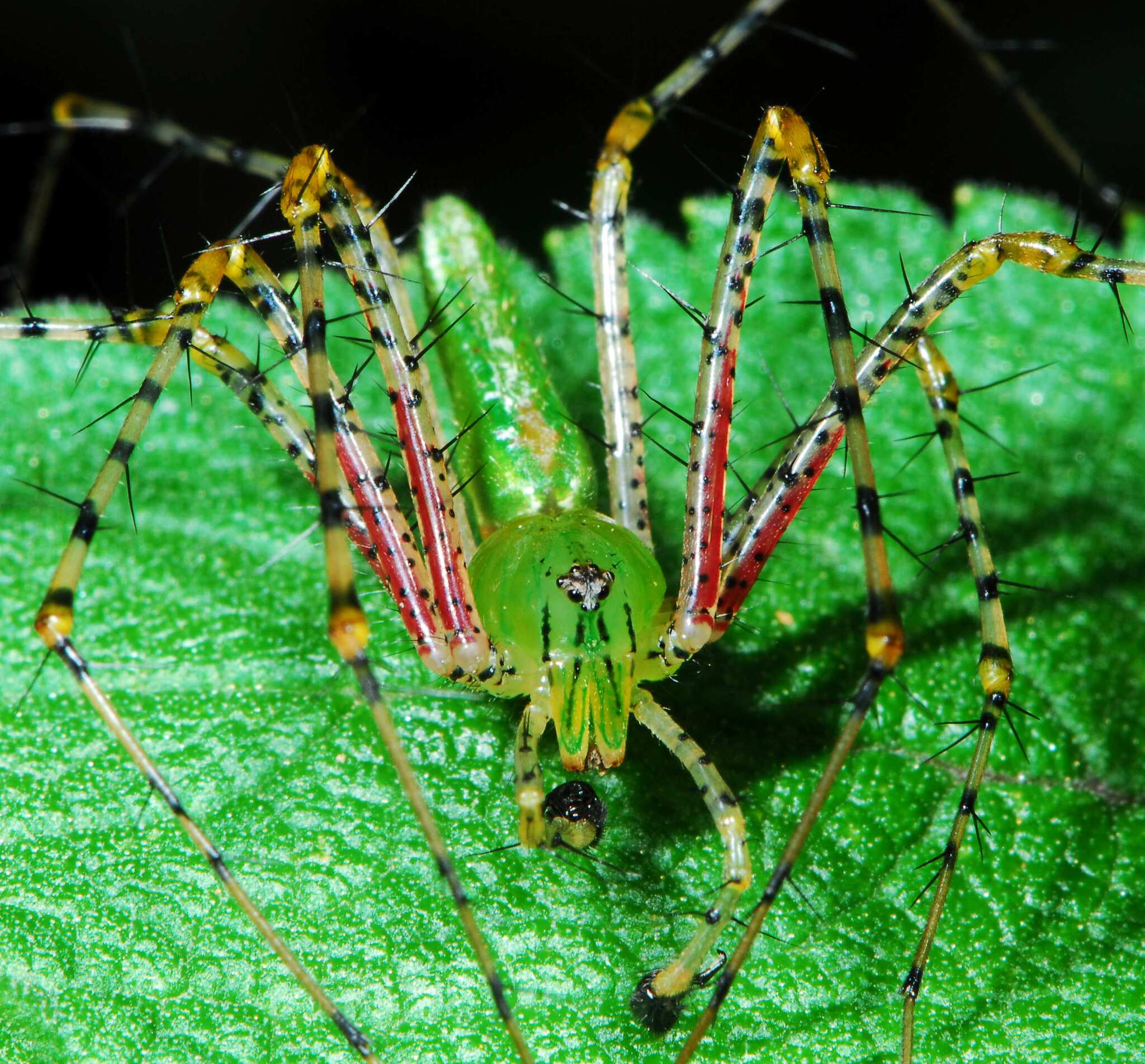
male

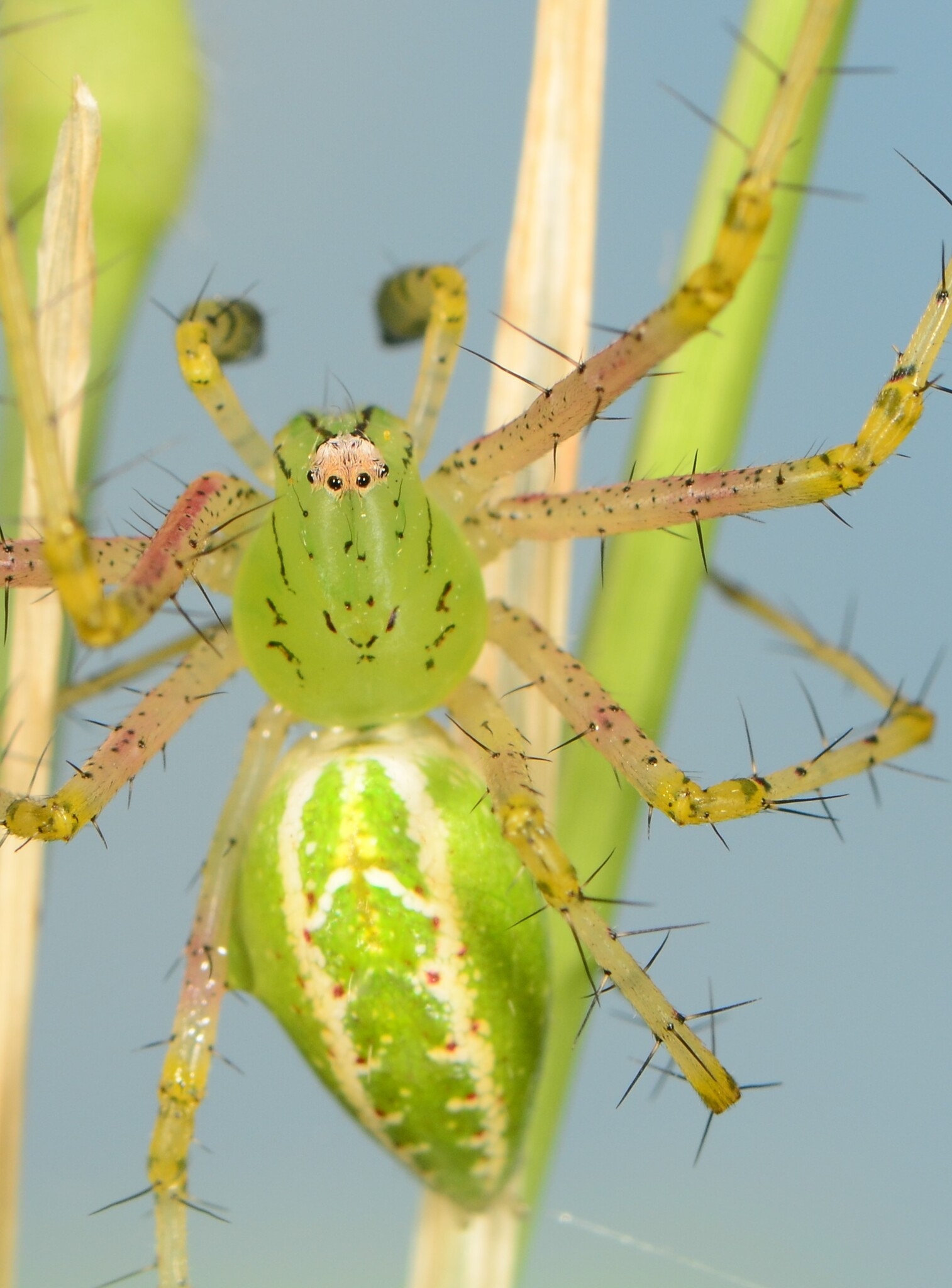
juvenile male

Peucetia striata is known from both sexes. Like other green lynx spiders, it displays green coloration and has long, slender legs with prominent spines.

== Conservation ==
Peucetia striata is listed as Least Concern by the South African National Biodiversity Institute due to its wide range across multiple countries and continents. The species is protected in more than 10 protected areas in South Africa.

== Taxonomy ==
The species was originally described by Ferdinand Karsch in 1878 from Zanzibar. A comprehensive revision by van Niekerk and Dippenaar-Schoeman in 1994 synonymized several previously described species with P. striata.
