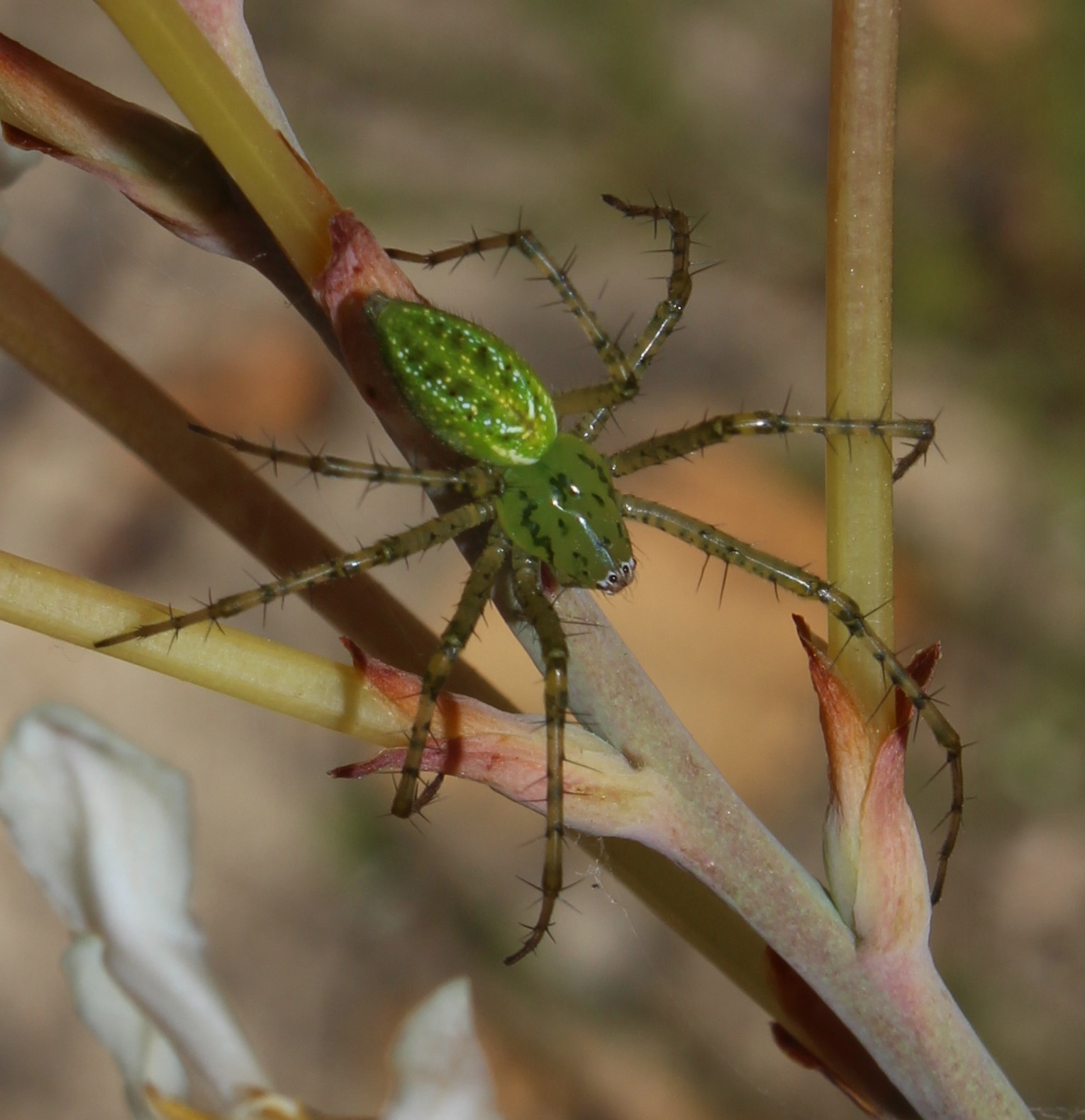

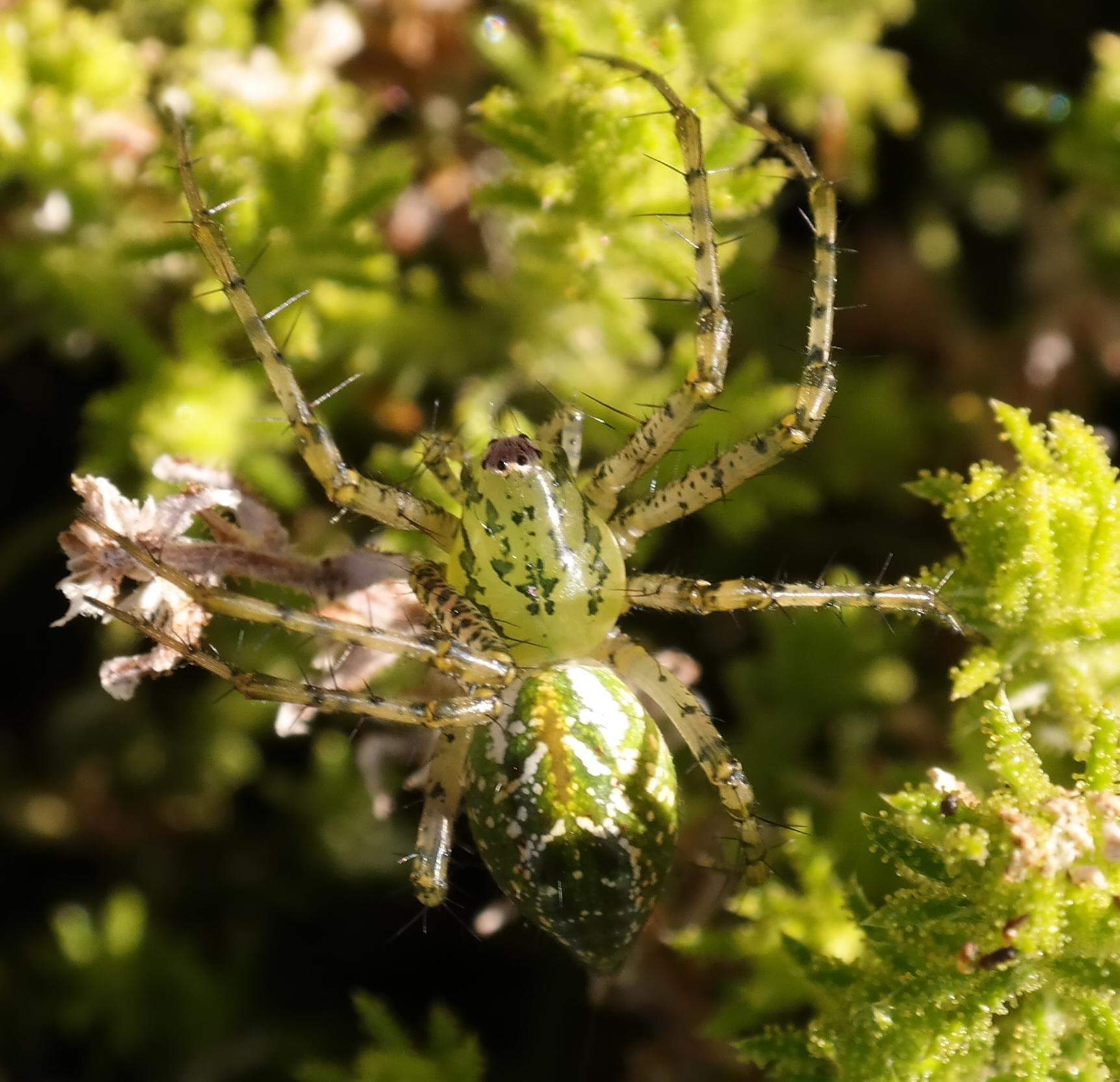

Scientific classification
- Kingdom: Animalia
- Phylum: Arthropoda
- Subphylum: Chelicerata
- Class: Arachnida
- Order: Araneae
- Infraorder: Araneomorphae
- Family: Oxyopidae
- Genus: Peucetia
- Species: P. nicolae

Binomial name
- Peucetia nicolae van Niekerk & Dippenaar-Schoeman, 1994

= Peucetia nicolae =

Nicole's Green Lynx Spider

Species of spider

Peucetia nicolae is a species of spider in the family Oxyopidae. It is endemic to South Africa and is commonly known as Nicole's green lynx spider.

== Distribution ==
Peucetia nicolae is found only in South Africa, where it is recorded from two provinces: Eastern Cape and Western Cape.

== Habitat and ecology ==
The species inhabits Fynbos and Savanna biomes at altitudes ranging from 7 to 1,535 m above sea level.

Peucetia nicolae is a free-living plant dweller that occurs on vegetation. At Gordon's Bay, the species has been recorded on Pelargonium captatum.

== Conservation ==
Peucetia nicolae is listed as Least Concern by the South African National Biodiversity Institute due to its wide distribution range. The species is protected in Mountain Zebra National Park, Addo Elephant National Park, Kirstenbosch National Botanical Garden, and Table Mountain National Park.

== Taxonomy ==
The species was originally described by van Niekerk and Dippenaar-Schoeman in 1994 from Heidelberg in the Western Cape.
