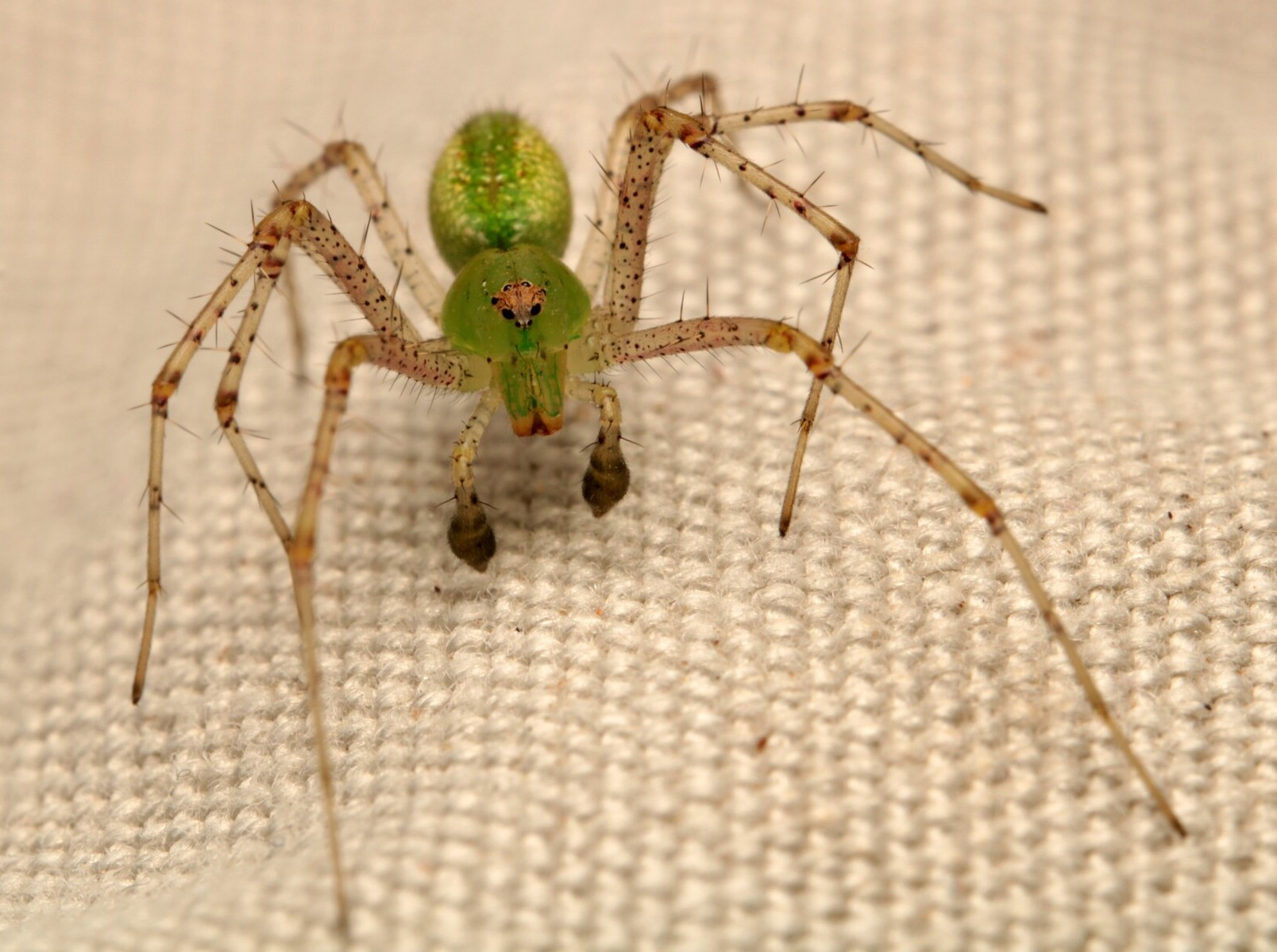

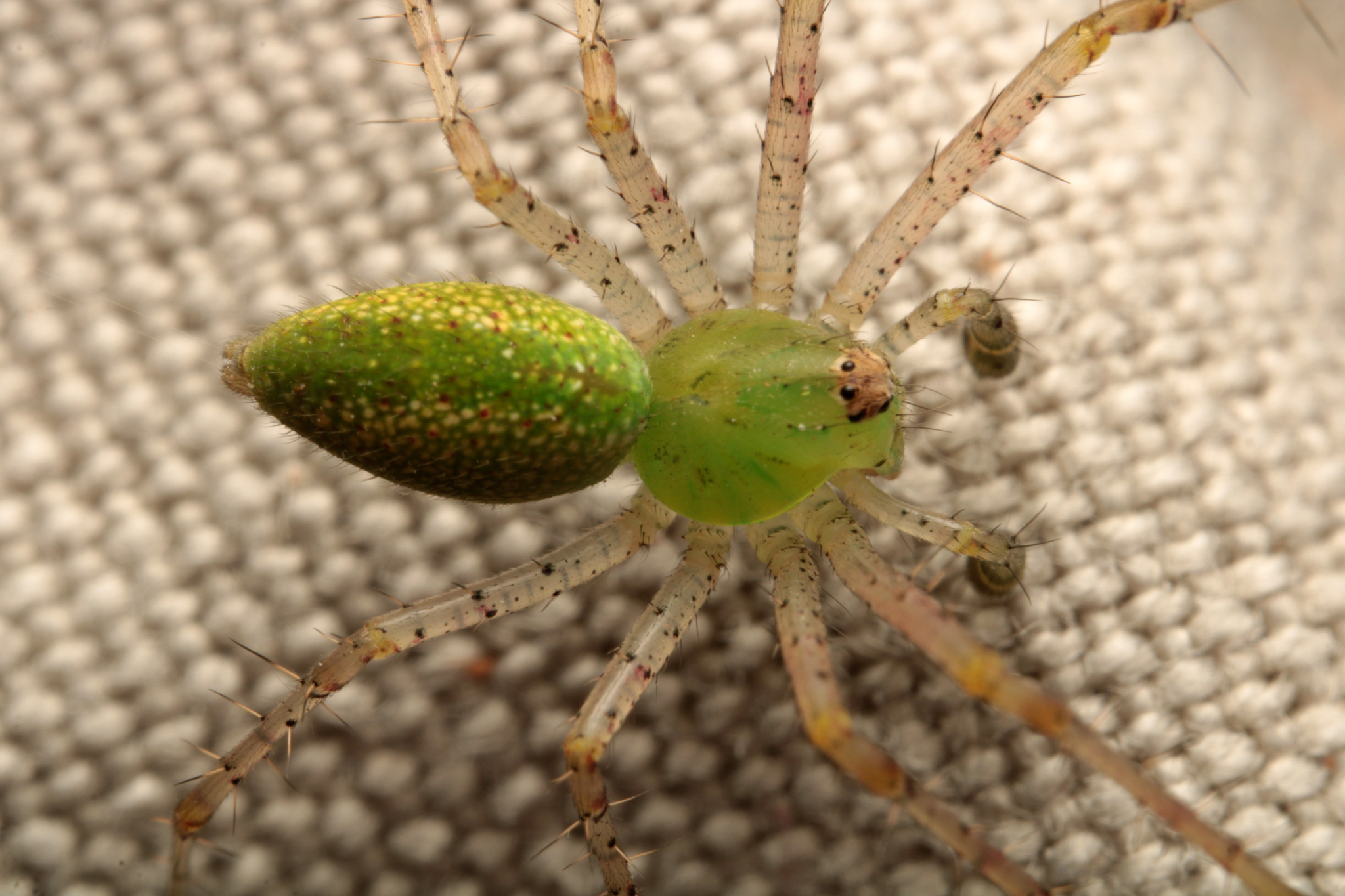

Scientific classification
- Kingdom: Animalia
- Phylum: Arthropoda
- Subphylum: Chelicerata
- Class: Arachnida
- Order: Araneae
- Infraorder: Araneomorphae
- Family: Oxyopidae
- Genus: Peucetia
- Species: P. maculifera

Binomial name
- Peucetia maculifera Pocock, 1900

= Peucetia maculifera =

Red-Legged Green Lynx Spider

Species of spider

Peucetia maculifera is a species of spider in the family Oxyopidae. It is endemic to southern Africa and is commonly known as the red-legged green lynx spider.

== Distribution ==
Peucetia maculifera occurs in Lesotho and South Africa. In South Africa, the species is recorded from four provinces: Eastern Cape, KwaZulu-Natal, Northern Cape, and Western Cape.

== Habitat and ecology ==
The species inhabits multiple biomes including Fynbos, Grassland, Nama Karoo, and Savanna biomes at altitudes ranging from 48 to 2,785 m above sea level.

Peucetia maculifera is a free-living plant dweller that occurs on vegetation.

== Description ==
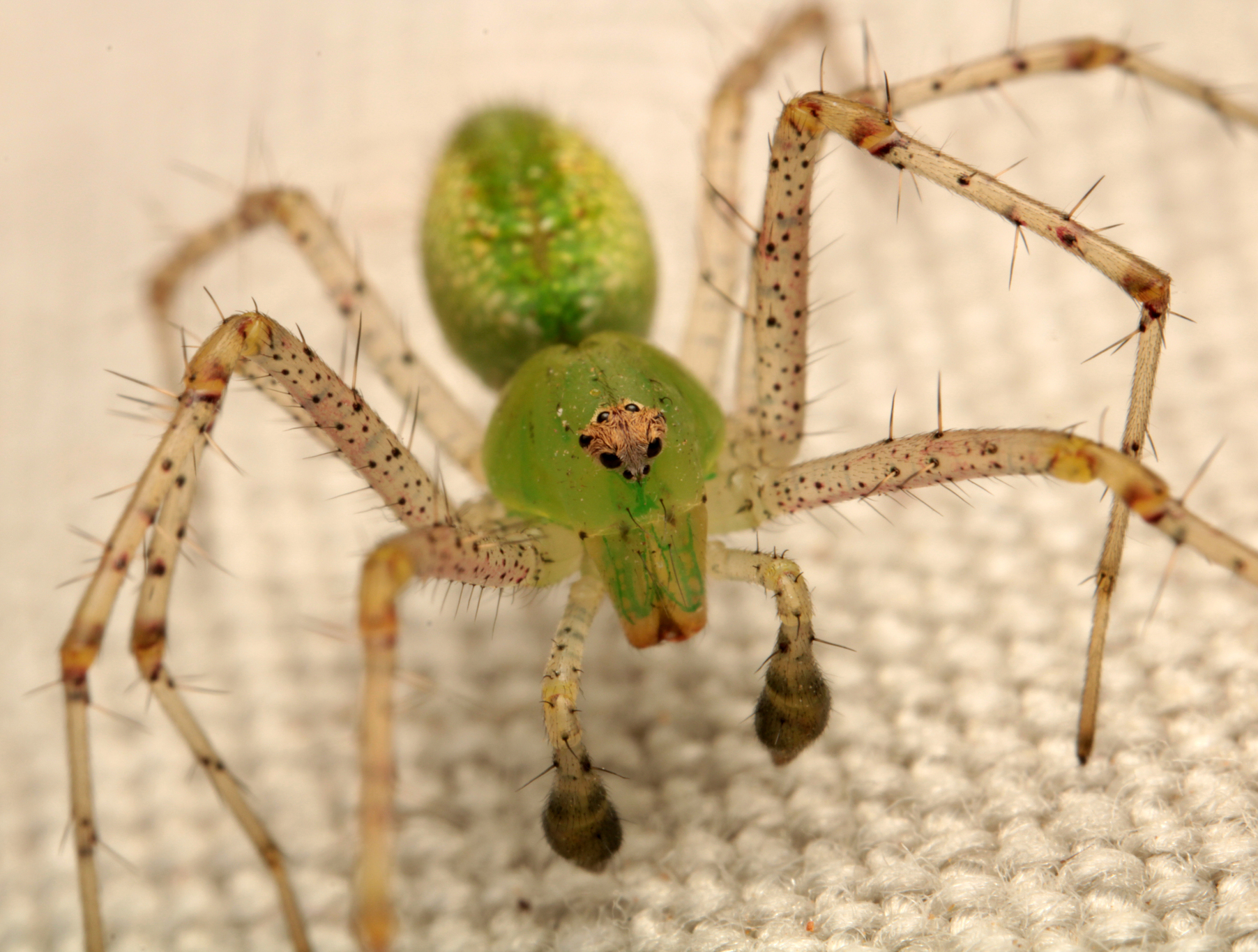

Peucetia maculifera is known from both sexes. The species is characterized by the absence of clypeal lines. Like other green lynx spiders, it displays bright green coloration and has long, slender legs with prominent spines.

== Conservation ==
Peucetia maculifera is listed as Least Concern by the South African National Biodiversity Institute due to its wide geographic range. The species is protected in three areas: Mountain Zebra National Park, Oorlogskloof Nature Reserve, and Swartberg Nature Reserve.

== Taxonomy ==
The species was originally described by Reginald Pocock in 1900 from King William's Town. A revision of the Afrotropical species of Peucetia was conducted by van Niekerk and Dippenaar-Schoeman in 1994.
