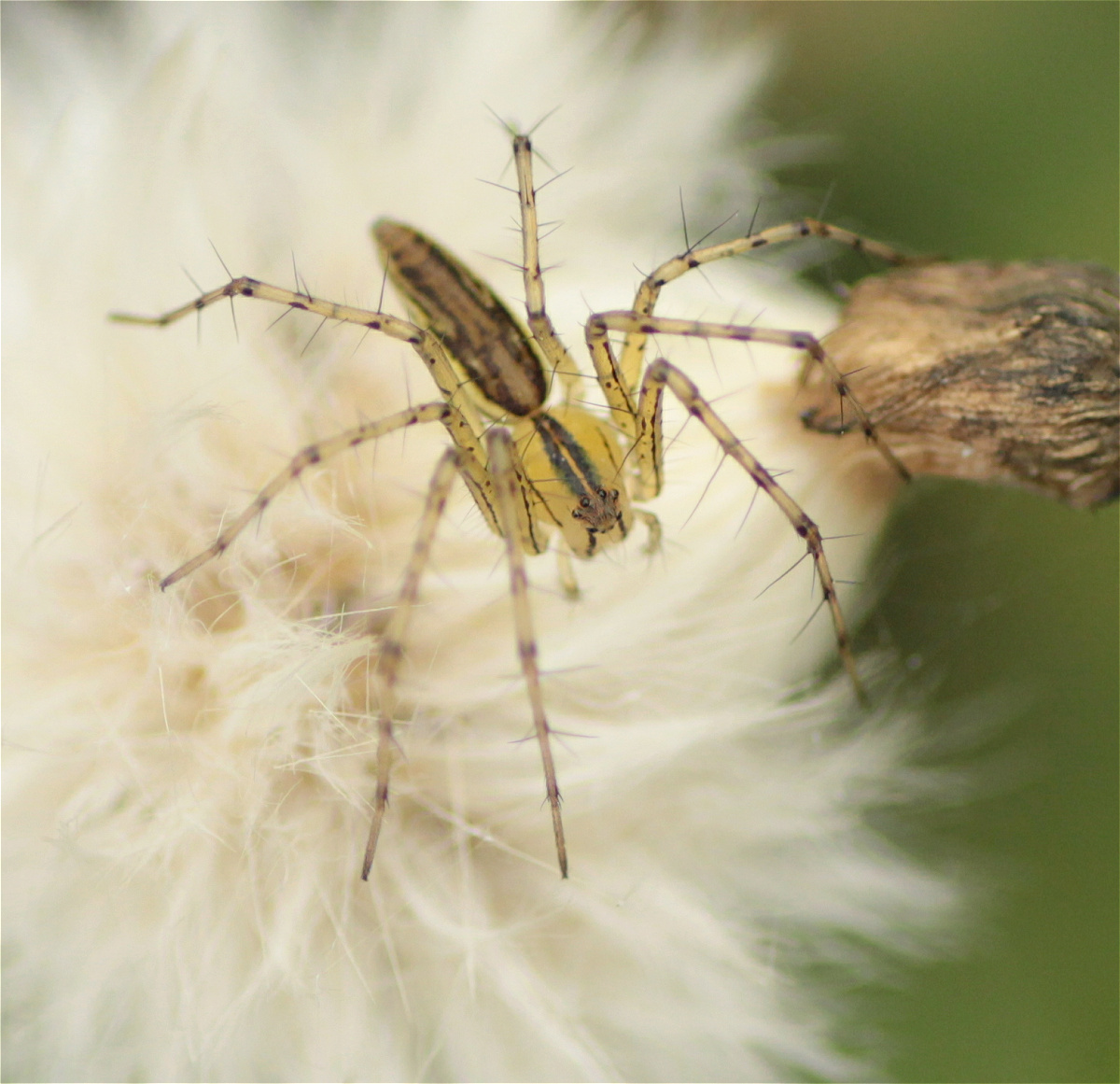
- P. rubrolineata from Colombia

Scientific classification
- Kingdom: Animalia
- Phylum: Arthropoda
- Subphylum: Chelicerata
- Class: Arachnida
- Order: Araneae
- Infraorder: Araneomorphae
- Family: Oxyopidae
- Genus: Peucetia
- Species: P. rubrolineata

Binomial name
- Peucetia rubrolineata Keyserling, 1877

Synonyms
- Peucetia similis Keyserling, 1877; Peucetia amazonica Mello-Leitão, 1929; Peucetia heterochroma Mello-Leitão, 1929; Peucetia maculipedes Piza, 1938; Peucetia trivittata Mello-Leitão, 1940; Peucetia duplovittata Mello-Leitão, 1941; Peucetia roseonigra Mello-Leitão, 1943; Tapinillus argentinus Mello-Leitão, 1941

= Peucetia rubrolineata =

Species of lynx spider

Peucetia rubrolineata is a species of lynx spider in the family Oxyopidae. It was first described by Keyserling in 1877. The species is widely distributed throughout the Neotropics, ranging from Panama to central Argentina.

The species name "rubrolineata" refers to the red bands on the carapace.

== Description ==
Males have a total length ranging from 5.71 to 10.28 mm, while females range from 2.85 to 13.28 mm. The carapace is orange with red thoracic groove and variable red longitudinal bands. In live or fresh specimens, the carapace displays two median red longitudinal bands that can vary in width, sometimes covering almost the entire carapace. The clypeus and chelicerae are orange, with chelicerae bearing two lateral red bands and a black spot on the cheliceral boss.

Males have cream-colored legs with darker metatarsus and tarsus, and dark spots at the base of spines. The abdomen is gray dorsally with lateral white bands, and gray ventrally with white spots near the epigastric furrow and spinnerets. The palpal structure is distinctive, featuring a bifid paracymbium with simple branches and a median apophysis with a curved, bifid apical projection.

Females display more variable coloration, with an orange carapace marked by red margins and longitudinal lines. The sternum is green with orange margins. The legs are orange with black spots at the base of spines, and red spots at the base of ventral femoral spines. The abdomen is white with a gray folium dorsally and a central gray band ventrally. The epigynum is concave with distinctive longitudinal and transverse septa.

== Taxonomy ==
The taxonomic history of this species is complex, with numerous species names now considered synonymous. Santos and Brescovit conducted a comprehensive revision of the genus in 2003, establishing that eight previously recognized species names are junior synonyms of P. rubrolineata. The synonymization was based on detailed morphological comparisons, including examination of type specimens and analysis of pre-epigynal structures in immature females.

For immature-based nominal species like P. similis, P. maculipedes, and P. trivittata, the authors compared pre-epigynal development patterns. In P. rubrolineata, the pre-epigynum presents only two pits, with tenuous sulci connecting the pits to the epigastric furrow before the final molt, and curved lines developing anteriorly to the pits. This structure differs markedly from other species in the genus.

The synonymy of Tapinillus argentinus was established through comparison with equally-sized immatures, based on carapace coloration vestiges and relative eye sizes. The type specimen of P. roseonigra could not be located, so its synonymization was based on the original description and illustrations, supplemented by specimens from the type locality.

== Distribution ==
The species has a broad Neotropical distribution, occurring from Panama through much of South America to Argentina. It has been recorded from various countries including Brazil, where many of the type specimens were originally housed at the Museu Nacional before the devastating fire in 2018. In Chile, it is restricted to the extreme northern regions.
