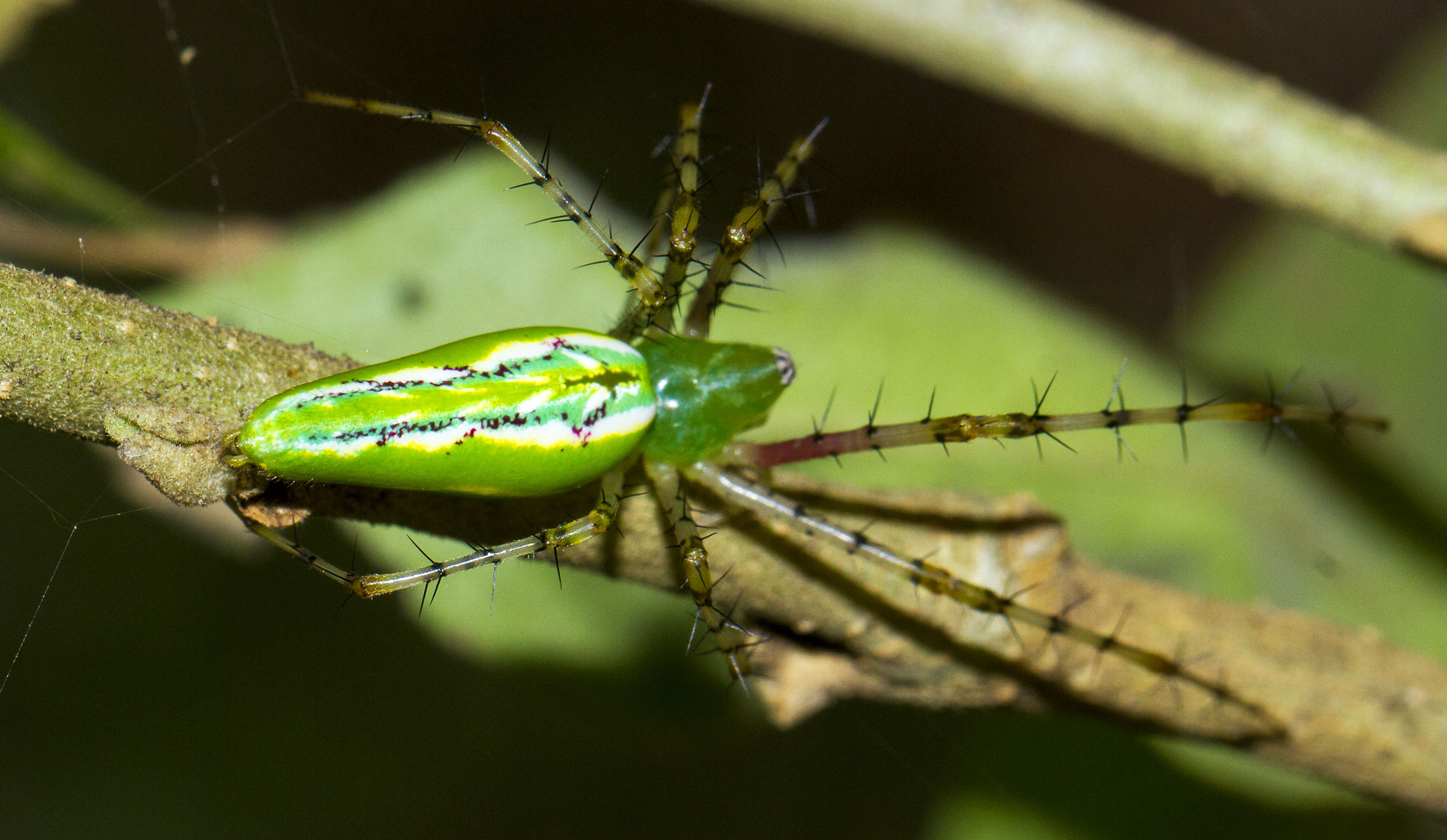

Scientific classification
- Kingdom: Animalia
- Phylum: Arthropoda
- Subphylum: Chelicerata
- Class: Arachnida
- Order: Araneae
- Infraorder: Araneomorphae
- Family: Oxyopidae
- Genus: Peucetia
- Species: P. madalenae

Binomial name
- Peucetia madalenae van Niekerk & Dippenaar-Schoeman, 1994

= Peucetia madalenae =

Spotted Leg Green Lynx Spider

Species of spider

Peucetia madalenae is a species of spider in the family Oxyopidae. It is endemic to southern Africa and is commonly known as the spotted leg green lynx spider.

== Distribution ==
Peucetia madalenae occurs in Mozambique and South Africa. In South Africa, the species is recorded from two provinces: KwaZulu-Natal and Limpopo.

== Habitat and ecology ==
The species inhabits the Savanna biome at altitudes ranging from 19 to 418 m above sea level.

Peucetia madalenae is a free-living plant dweller that occurs on vegetation.

== Description ==
Peucetia madalenae is known from both sexes. The species is characterized by the absence of clypeal lines. Like other green lynx spiders, it displays bright green coloration and has long, slender legs with prominent spines.

== Conservation ==
Peucetia madalenae is listed as Least Concern by the South African National Biodiversity Institute due to its wide geographic range. The species is protected in Ndumo Game Reserve, Tembe Elephant Park, and Kruger National Park.

== Taxonomy ==
The species was originally described by van Niekerk and Dippenaar-Schoeman in 1994 from Mozambique.
