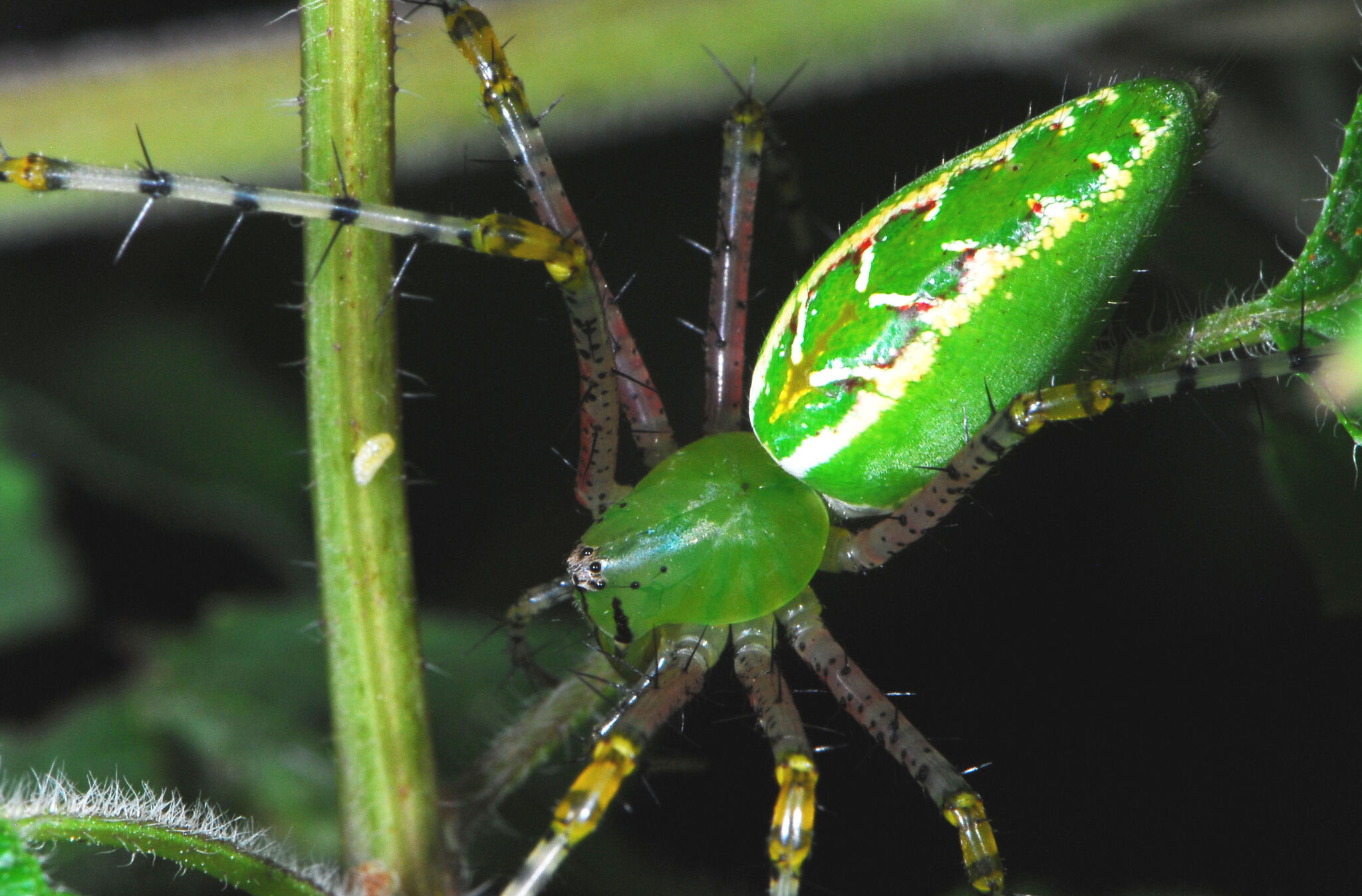
- female
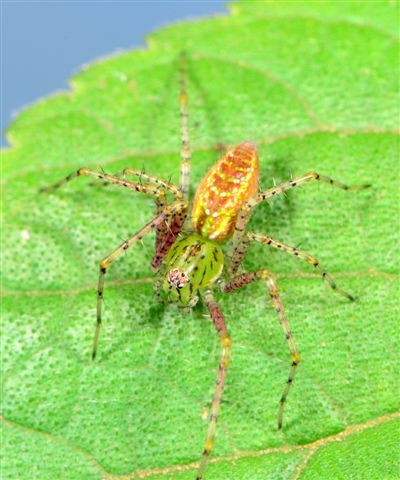
- juvenile

Scientific classification
- Kingdom: Animalia
- Phylum: Arthropoda
- Subphylum: Chelicerata
- Class: Arachnida
- Order: Araneae
- Infraorder: Araneomorphae
- Family: Oxyopidae
- Genus: Peucetia
- Species: P. pulchra

Binomial name
- Peucetia pulchra (Blackwall, 1865)

Synonyms
- Pasithea pulchra Blackwall, 1865

= Peucetia pulchra =

Striped Face Green Lynx Spider

Species of spider

Peucetia pulchra is a species of spider in the family Oxyopidae. It is found across multiple African countries and the Seychelles and is commonly known as the striped face green lynx spider.

== Distribution ==
Peucetia pulchra has a wide distribution across Central, Eastern, and Southern Africa, as well as the Seychelles. In South Africa, the species is recorded from two provinces: KwaZulu-Natal and Mpumalanga.

== Habitat and ecology ==
The species inhabits the Savanna biome at altitudes ranging from 48 to 1,345 m above sea level.

Peucetia pulchra is a free-living plant dweller that has been collected in mixed Acacia veld from grasses and herbs.

== Description ==
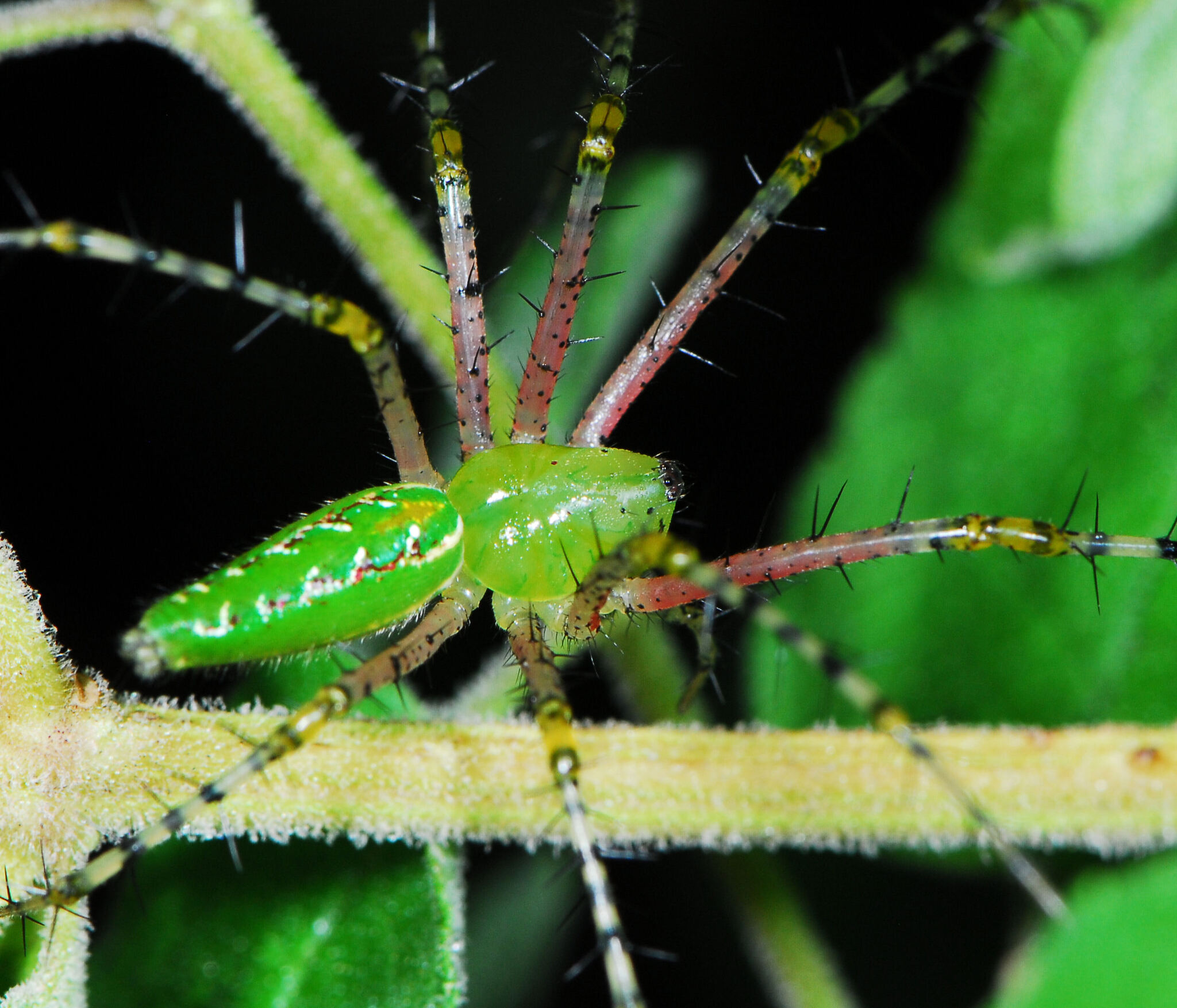
female

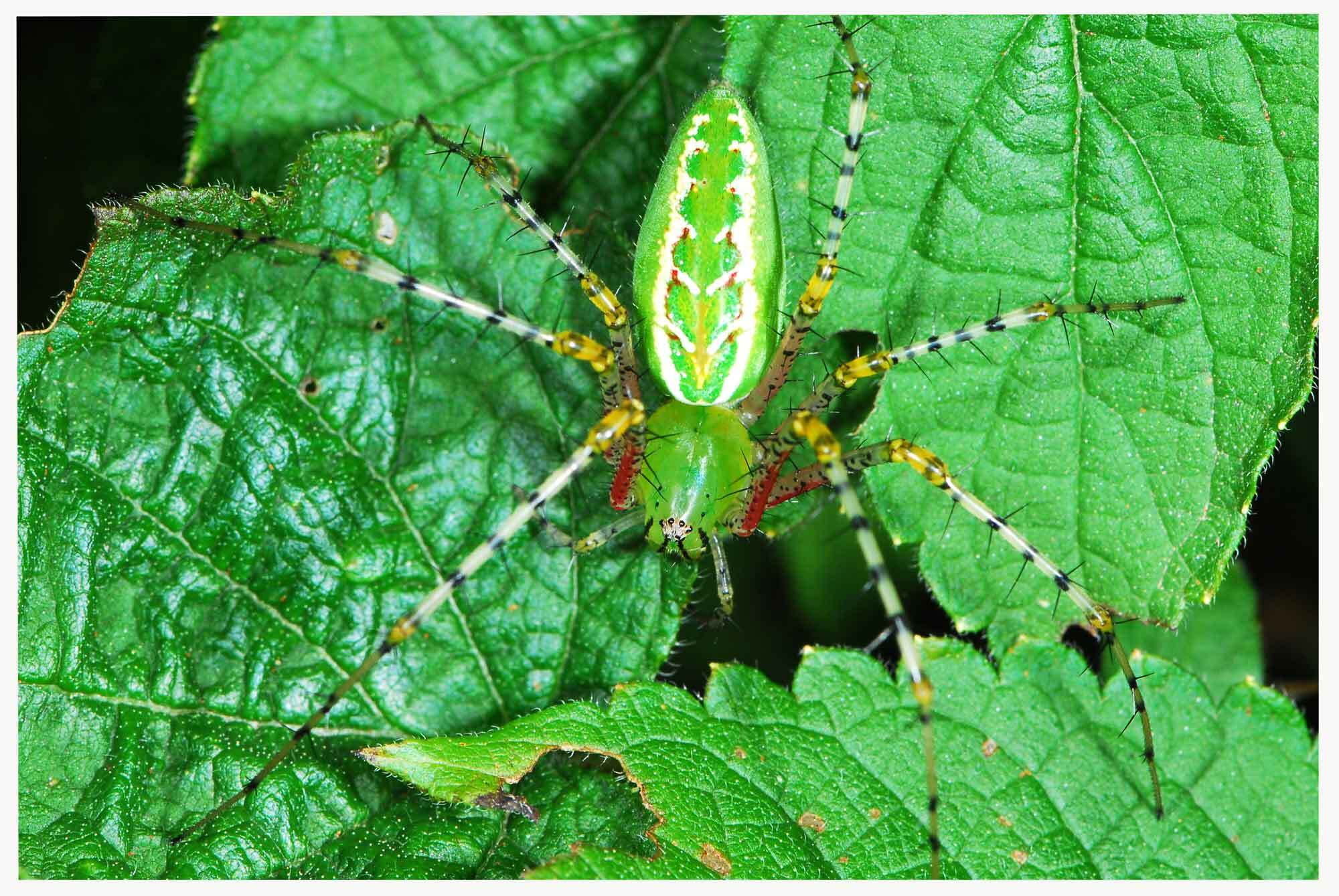
female

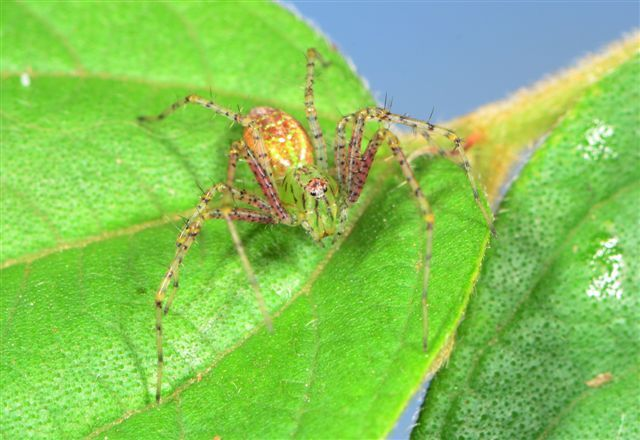
juvenile

Peucetia pulchra is known from both sexes. Like other green lynx spiders, it displays bright green coloration and has long, slender legs with prominent spines.

== Conservation ==
Peucetia pulchra is listed as Least Concern by the South African National Biodiversity Institute due to its wide geographic range across multiple African countries. The species is protected in Kruger National Park, Kosi Bay Nature Reserve, and Mkuzi Game Reserve.

== Taxonomy ==
The species was originally described by John Blackwall in 1865 from the Zambezi region under the name Pasithea pulchra. A revision of the Afrotropical species of Peucetia was conducted by van Niekerk and Dippenaar-Schoeman in 1994.
