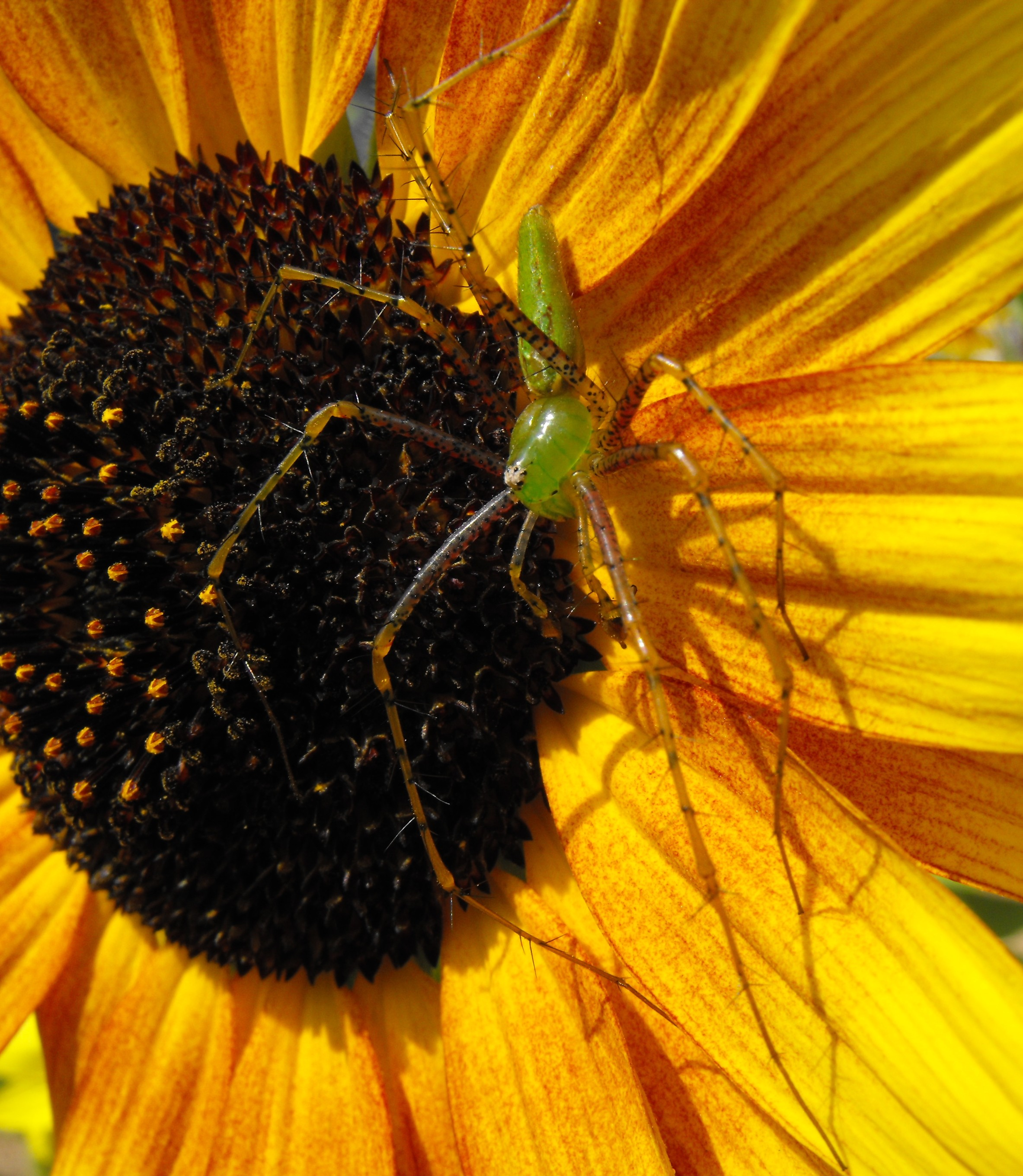

Scientific classification
- Domain: Eukaryota
- Kingdom: Animalia
- Phylum: Arthropoda
- Subphylum: Chelicerata
- Class: Arachnida
- Order: Araneae
- Infraorder: Araneomorphae
- Family: Oxyopidae
- Genus: Peucetia
- Species: P. longipalpis

Binomial name
- Peucetia longipalpis F. O. P.-Cambridge, 1902

= Peucetia longipalpis =

Species of spider

Peucetia longipalpis is a species of lynx spider in the family Oxyopidae. It is found in a range from the United States to Venezuela.It was first described by Frederick Octavius Pickard-Cambridge in the year 1902. It is a known predator of Narnia femorata.
