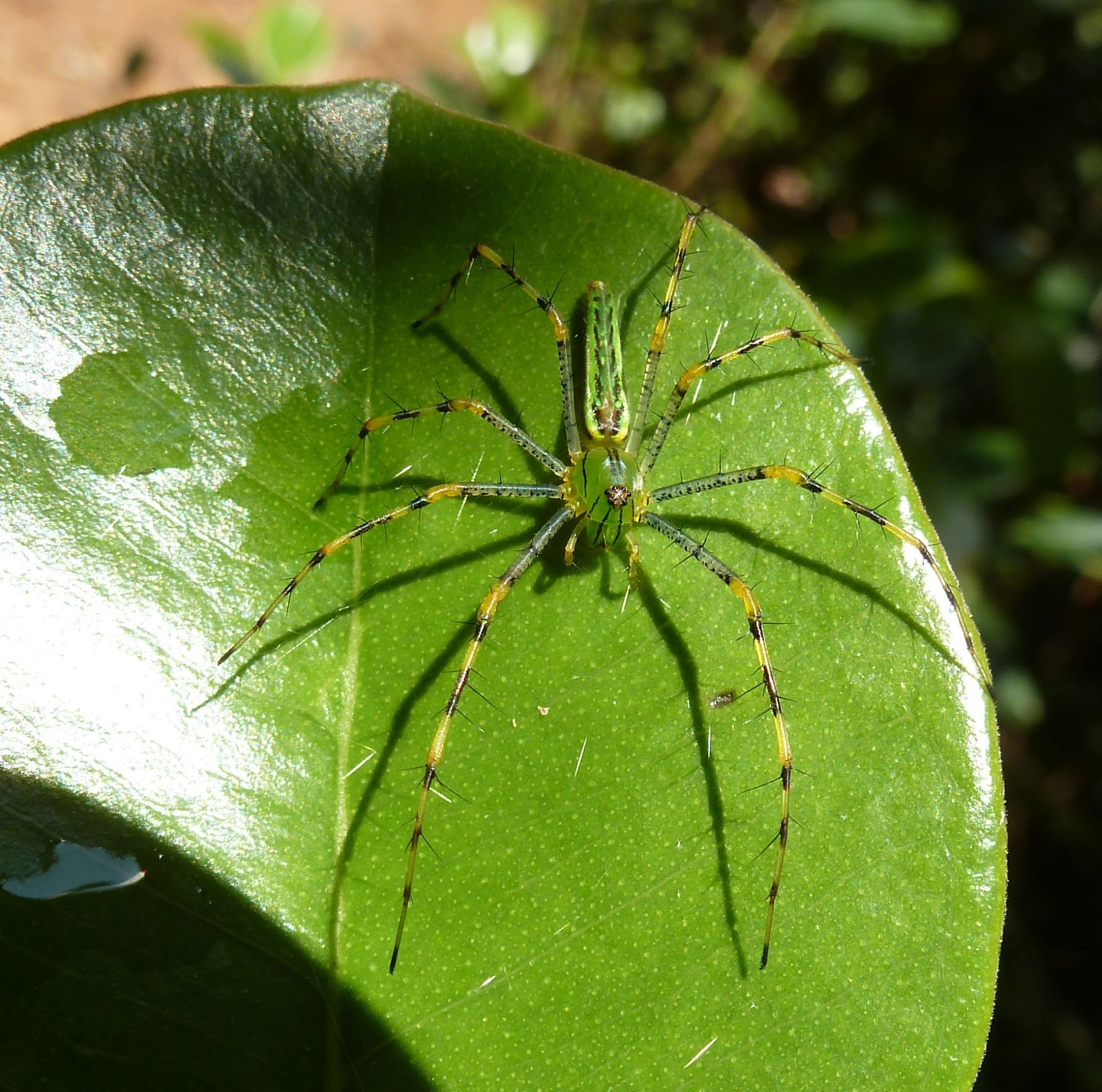

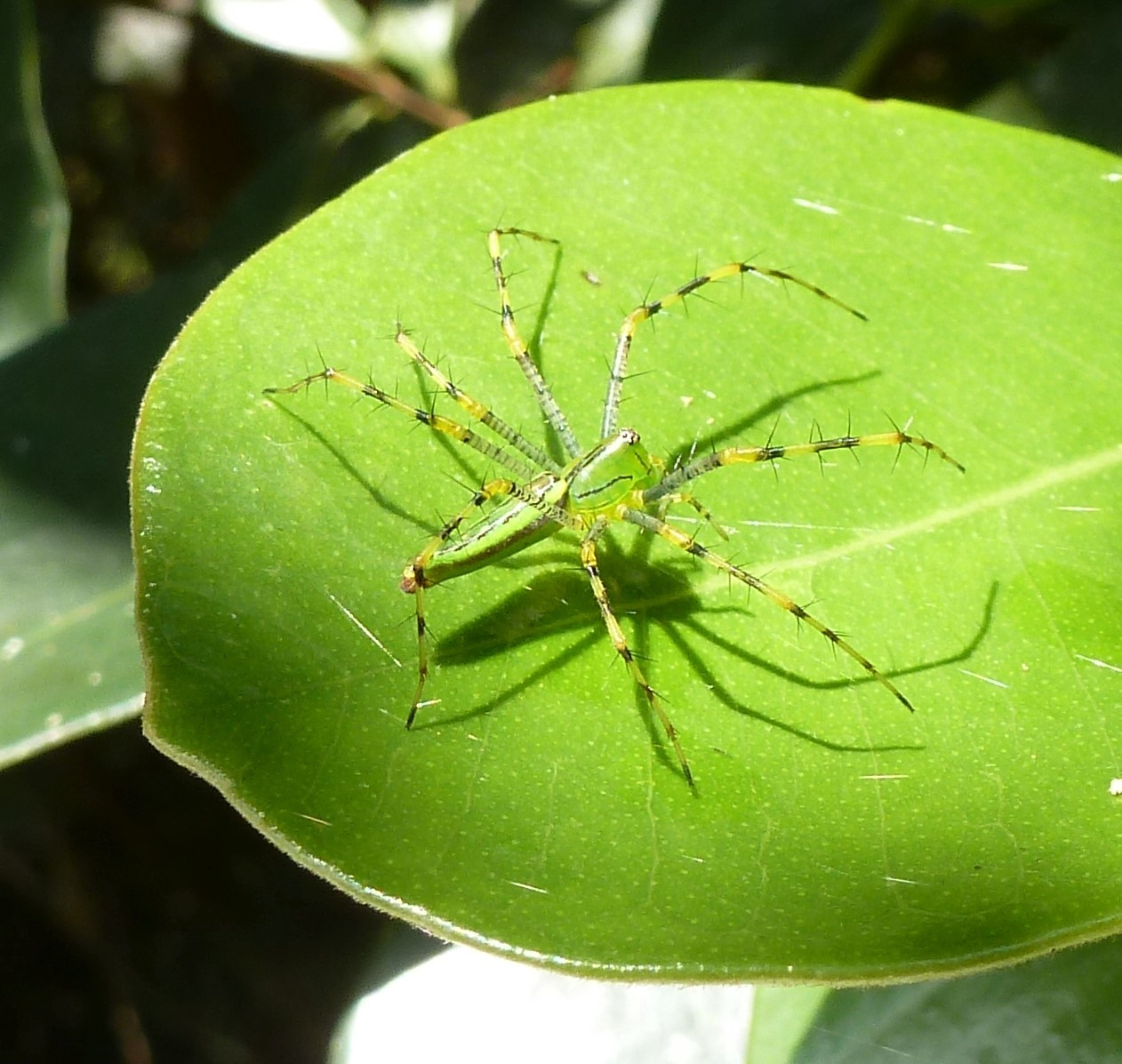

Scientific classification
- Kingdom: Animalia
- Phylum: Arthropoda
- Subphylum: Chelicerata
- Class: Arachnida
- Order: Araneae
- Infraorder: Araneomorphae
- Family: Oxyopidae
- Genus: Peucetia
- Species: P. lucasi

Binomial name
- Peucetia lucasi (Vinson, 1863)

Synonyms
- Sphasus lucasii Vinson, 1863

= Peucetia lucasi =

Madagascar Green Lynx Spider

Species of spider

Peucetia lucasi is a species of spider in the family Oxyopidae. It is found across multiple African countries and islands and is commonly known as the Madagascar green lynx spider.

== Distribution ==
Peucetia lucasi occurs in Botswana, South Africa, Comoros, Mayotte, and Madagascar. In South Africa, the species is known only from Limpopo province, specifically from Welgevonden Nature Reserve.

== Habitat and ecology ==
The species inhabits the Savanna biome at altitudes around 1,435 m above sea level.

Peucetia lucasi is a free-living plant dweller that occurs on vegetation.

== Conservation ==
Peucetia lucasi is listed as Least Concern by the South African National Biodiversity Institute due to its wide geographic range across multiple African countries. The species is protected in Welgevonden Nature Reserve.

== Taxonomy ==
The species was originally described by Auguste Vinson in 1863 from Madagascar under the name Sphasus lucasii. A revision of the Afrotropical species of Peucetia was conducted by van Niekerk and Dippenaar-Schoeman in 1994.
