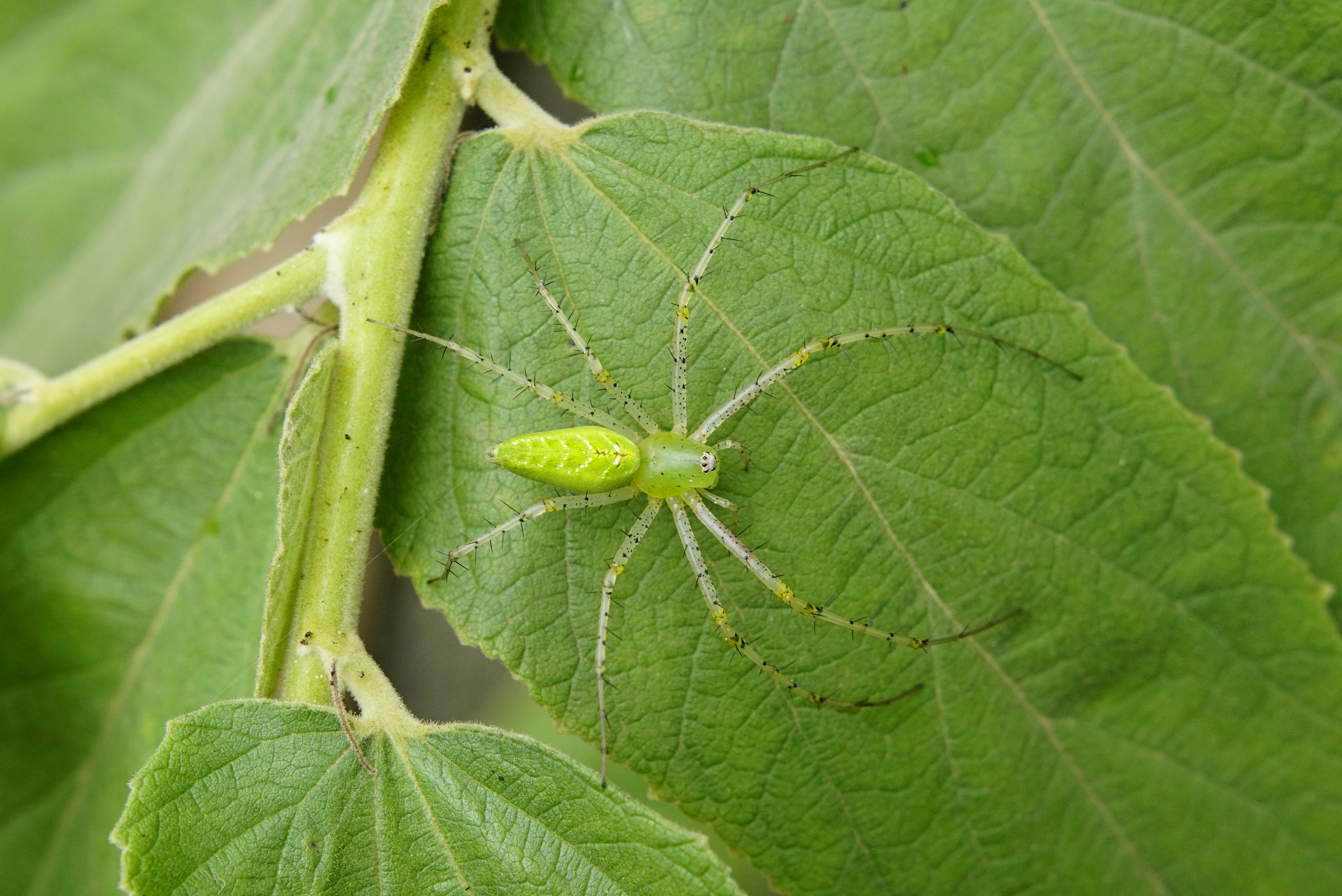

Scientific classification
- Kingdom: Animalia
- Phylum: Arthropoda
- Subphylum: Chelicerata
- Class: Arachnida
- Order: Araneae
- Infraorder: Araneomorphae
- Family: Oxyopidae
- Genus: Peucetia
- Species: P. viridana

Binomial name
- Peucetia viridana (Stoliczka, 1869)

Synonyms
- Sphasus viridanus Stoliczka, 1869; Peucetia viridana (Stoliczka, 1869); Peucetia nigropunctata Simon, 1884; Peucetia prasina Thorell, 1887

= Peucetia viridana =

Species of spider

Peucetia viridana is a species of spider found in India, Myanmar and Sri Lanka.

== Description ==
Peucetia viridana is a green colored spider with cephalothorax having brown spots. The head region has a few spines and the centre has deep fovea which is green in colour. The clypeus is long with two black lines extending from the base of the middle anterior eyes. The sternum is heart shaped, pointed behind and covered with pines and hair. The legs are long and strong covered with conspicuous black spots and black long spines. The abdomen is long, narrowing behind and covered with fine hair. A longitudinal deep brown line runs through the center of the abdomen with lateral branches.

The females are about 10–12 mm in size and the males about 8–10 mm in size.

== Habitat ==
It is generally found on grass and low shrubs.

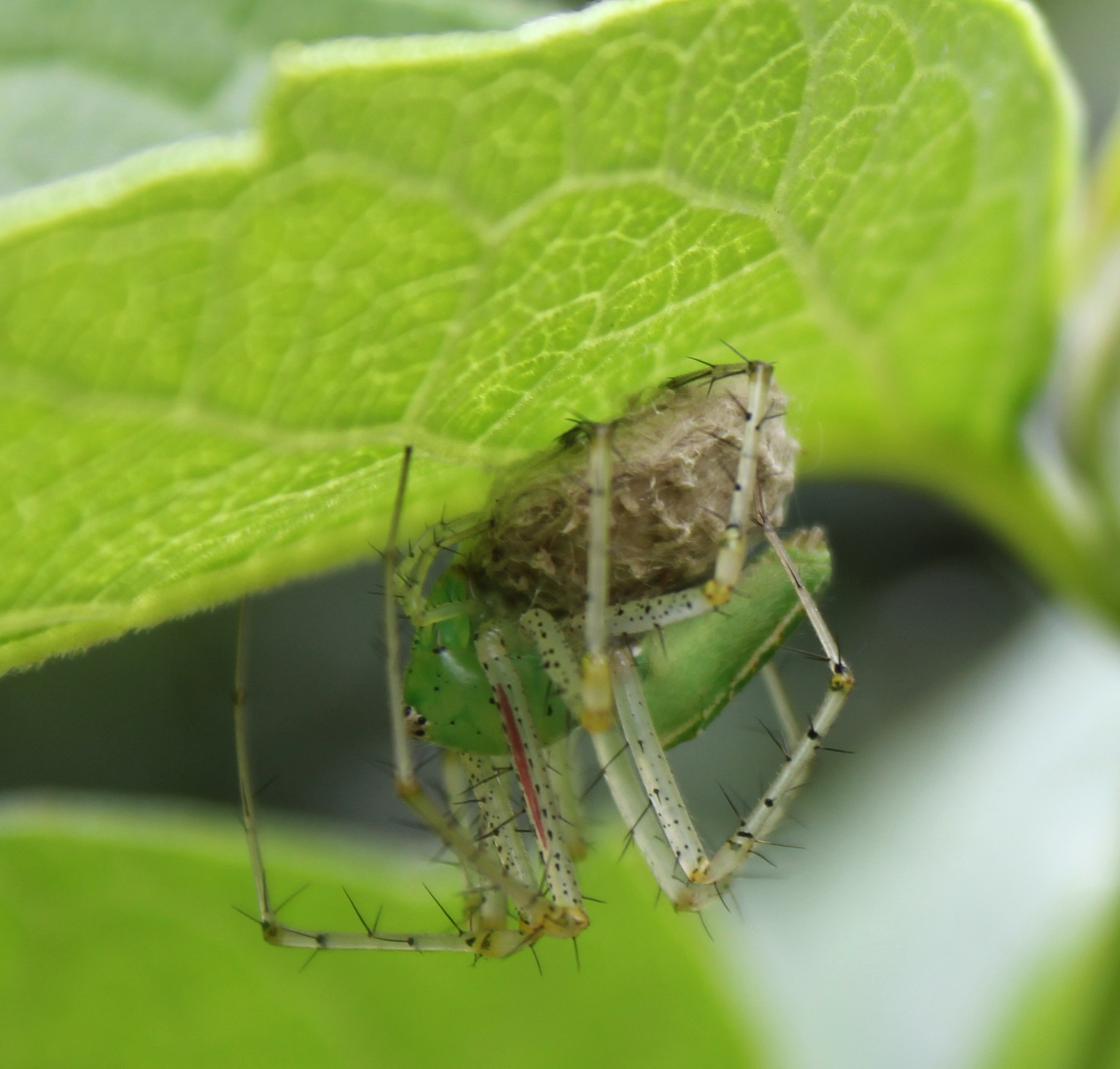
Female green lynx spider with egg sac
