= Peucetia transvaalica =

Transvaal Green Lynx Spider

Scientific classification
- Kingdom: Animalia
- Phylum: Arthropoda
- Subphylum: Chelicerata
- Class: Arachnida
- Order: Araneae
- Infraorder: Araneomorphae
- Family: Oxyopidae
- Genus: Peucetia
- Species: P. transvaalica

Binomial name
- Peucetia transvaalica Simon, 1897

Species of spider

Peucetia transvaalica is a species of spider in the family Oxyopidae. It is found across multiple African countries and is commonly known as the Transvaal green lynx spider.

== Distribution ==
Peucetia transvaalica occurs across Central and Southern Africa, including Botswana, Republic of the Congo, Mozambique, Eswatini, Uganda, Zimbabwe, and South Africa. In South Africa, the species is recorded from eight provinces.

== Habitat and ecology ==
The species inhabits multiple biomes including Grassland, Nama Karoo, and Savanna biomes at altitudes ranging from 93 to 1,556 m above sea level.

Peucetia transvaalica is a free-living plant dweller that occurs on vegetation.

== Description ==
Peucetia transvaalica is known from both sexes. The species is characterized by the absence of clypeal lines. Like other green lynx spiders, it displays green coloration and has long, slender legs with prominent spines.

== Conservation ==
Peucetia transvaalica is listed as Least Concern by the South African National Biodiversity Institute due to its wide geographic range across multiple African countries. The species is protected in several protected areas including Mhlopeni Nature Reserve, Tembe Elephant Park, Kruger National Park, Makalali Nature Reserve, Nylsvley Nature Reserve, Kgaswane Mountain Reserve, and Karoo National Park.

== Taxonomy ==
The species was originally described by Eugène Simon in 1897 from Matabeleland. A revision of the Afrotropical species of Peucetia was conducted by van Niekerk and Dippenaar-Schoeman in 1994.
