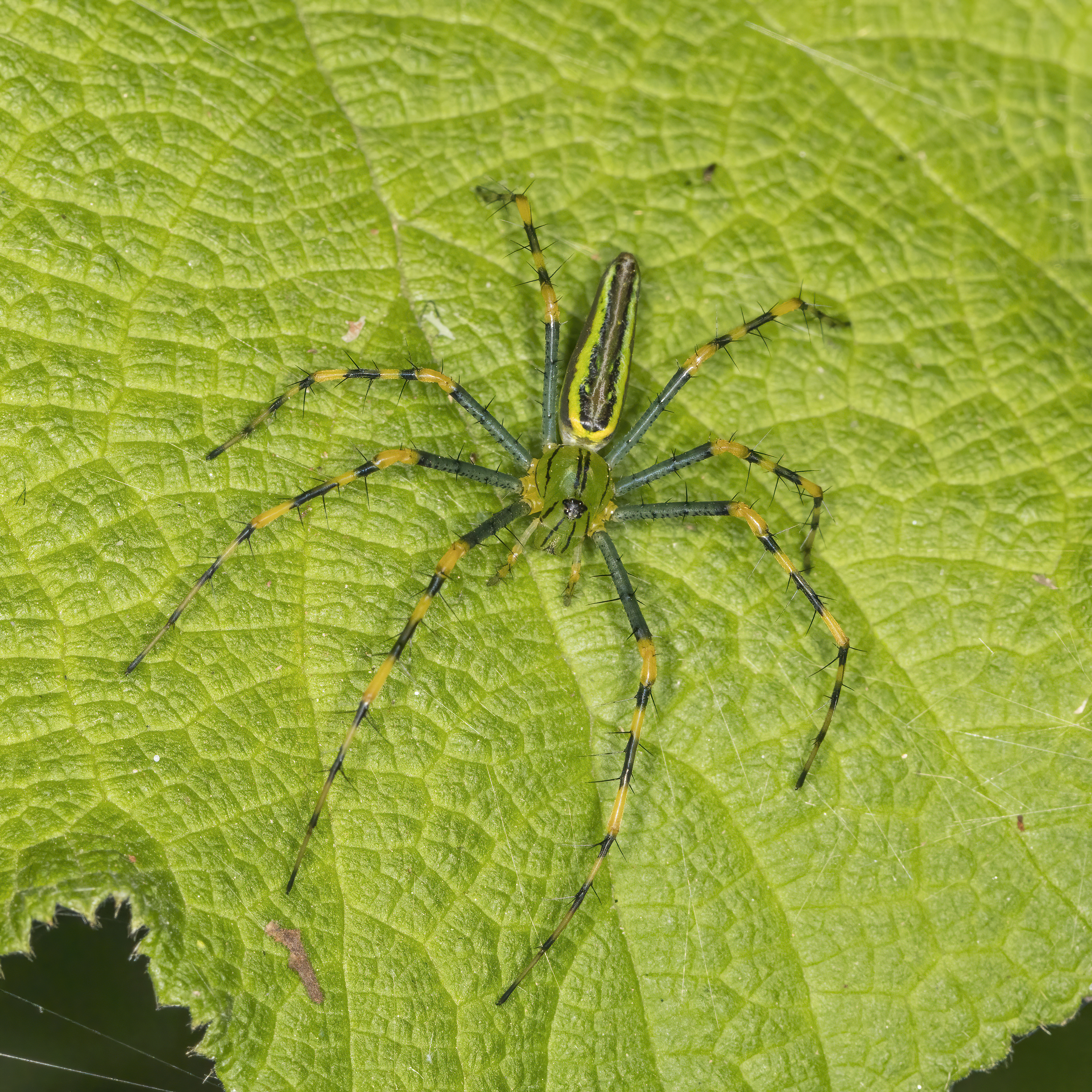
- Male P. madagascariensis
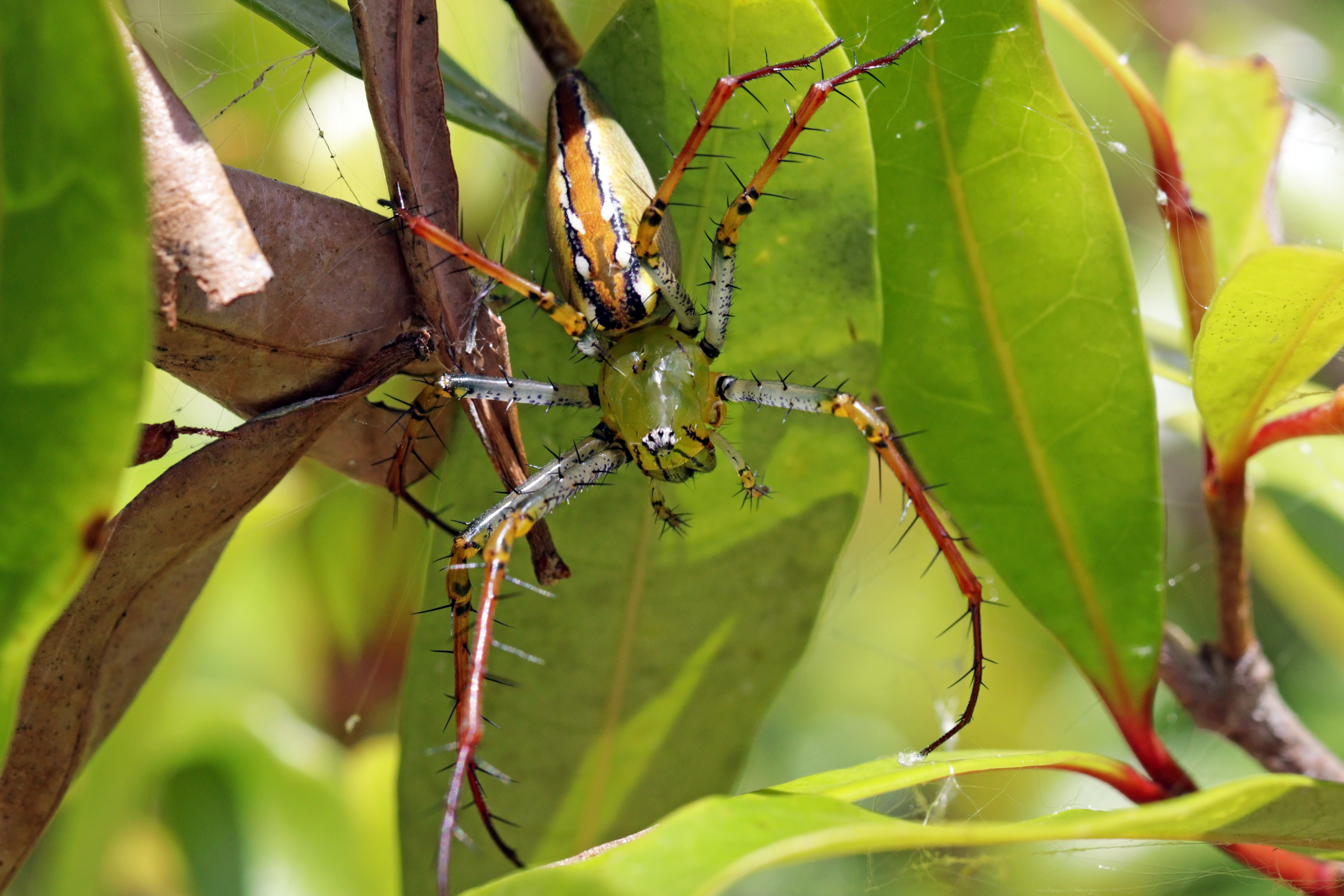
- Female P. madagascariensis

Scientific classification
- Kingdom: Animalia
- Phylum: Arthropoda
- Subphylum: Chelicerata
- Class: Arachnida
- Order: Araneae
- Infraorder: Araneomorphae
- Family: Oxyopidae
- Genus: Peucetia; Thorell, 1869

Diversity
- 47 species

= Peucetia =

Genus of spiders

Peucetia is a genus of lynx spiders that is found worldwide.

While P. viridana is found only in Asia, the similar named P. viridans (Green Lynx Spider) occurs only from the southern United States to Venezuela.

The only Peucetia species to occur in the United States, apart from P. viridans (which occurs in the south from coast to coast) is P. longipalpis, which occurs in the southwestern US to Belize.

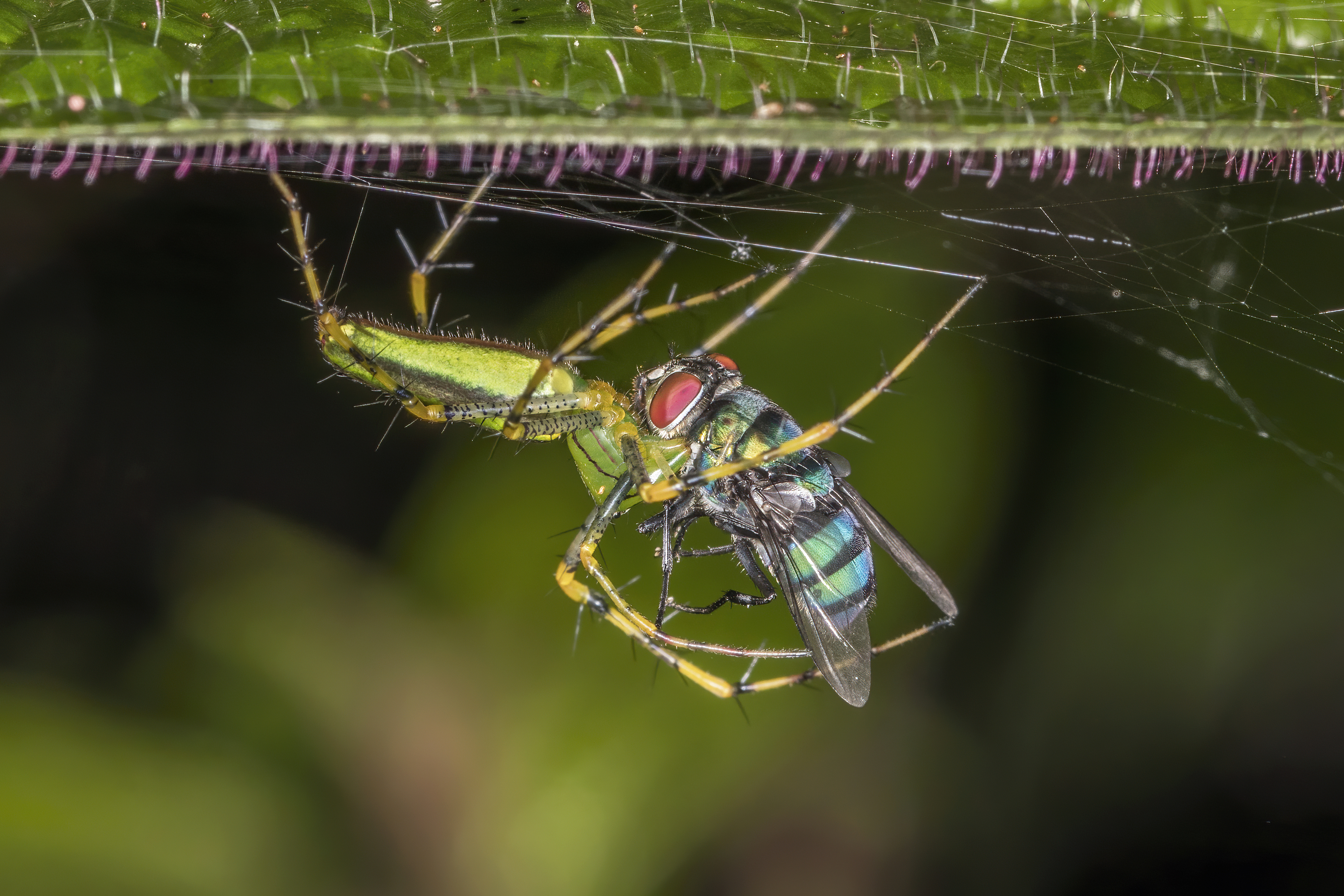
Malagasy green lynx spider (P. lucasi) and green bottle fly (Lucilia sp.)

== Species ==
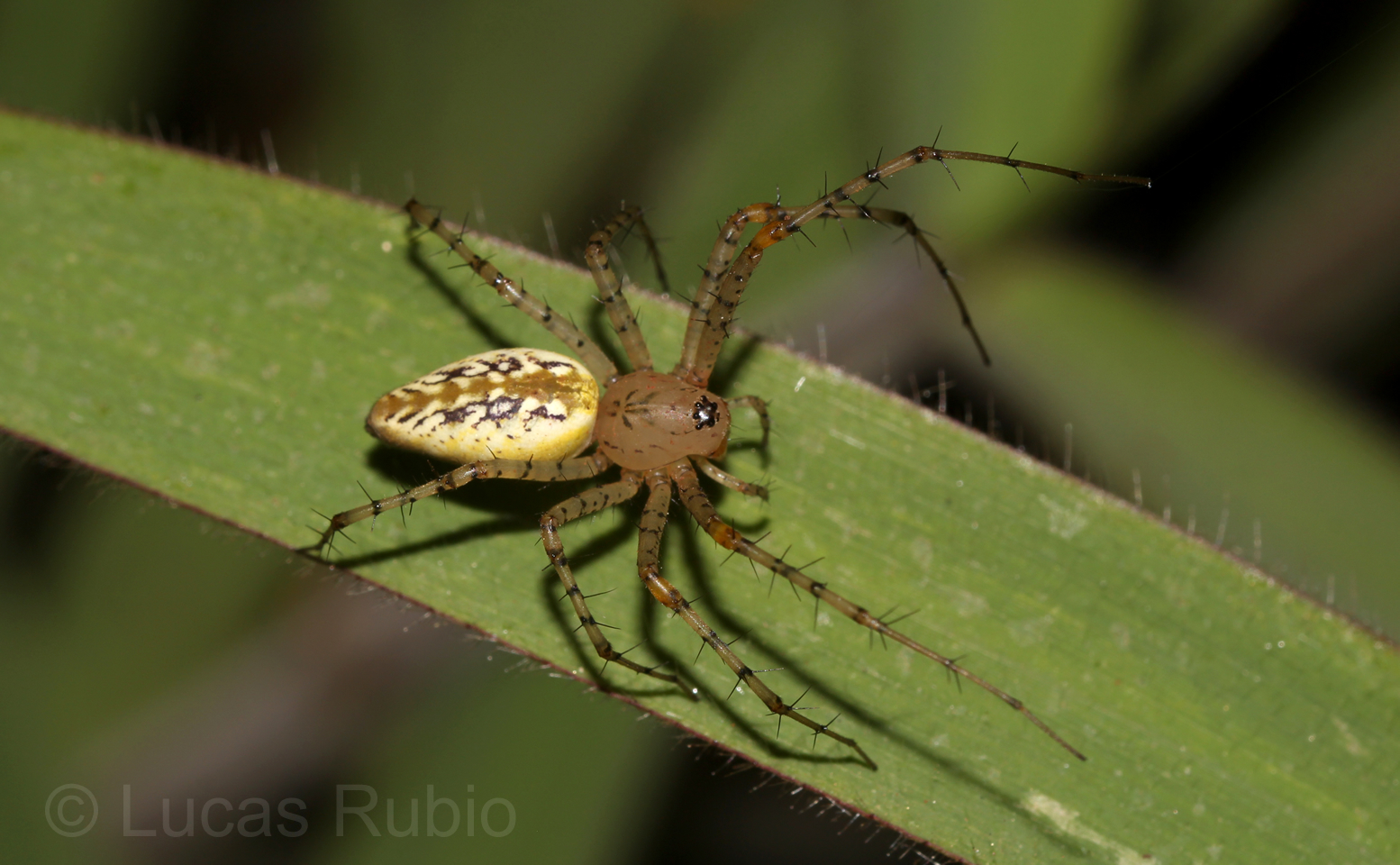
P. flava

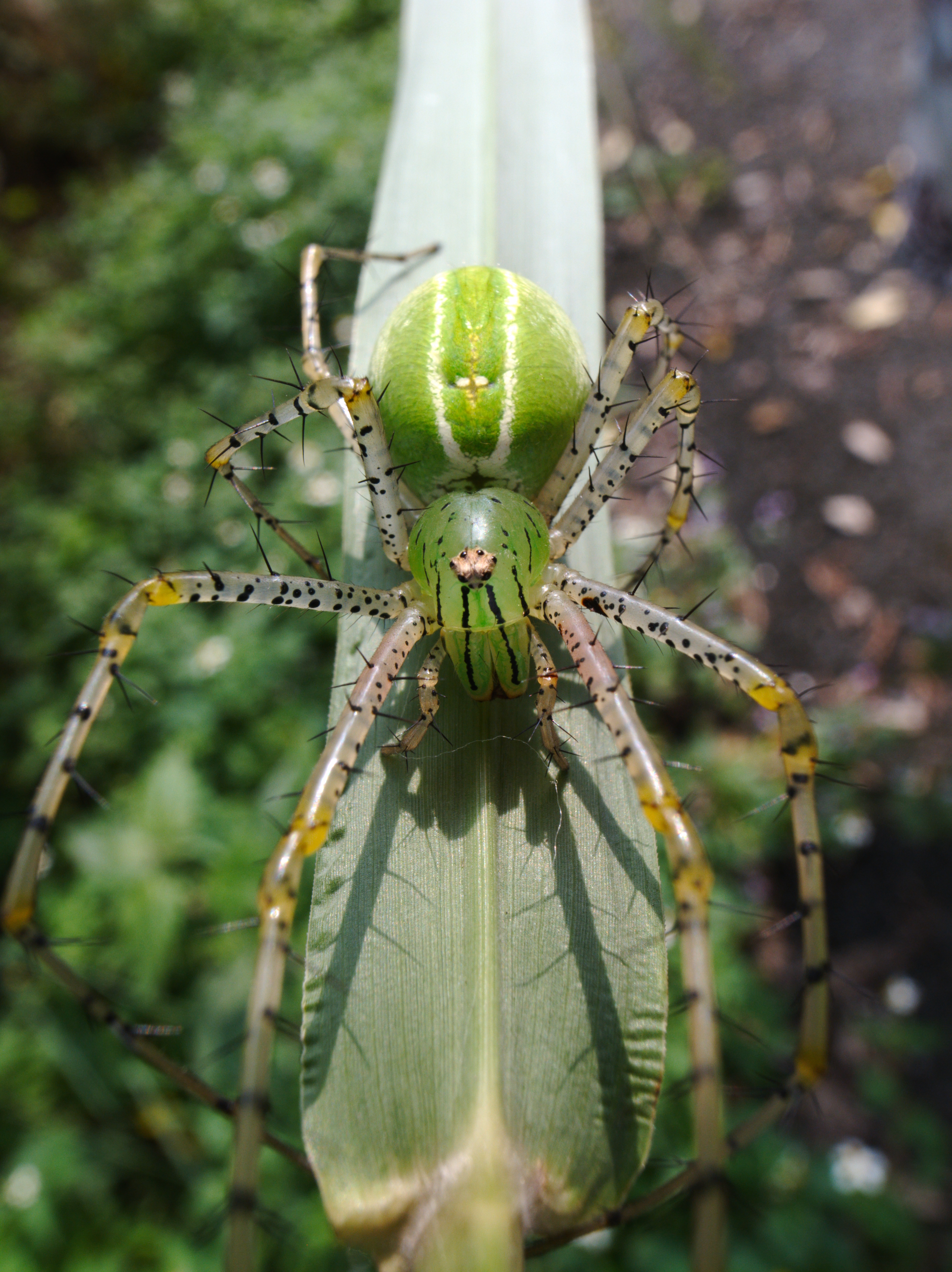
P. formosensis

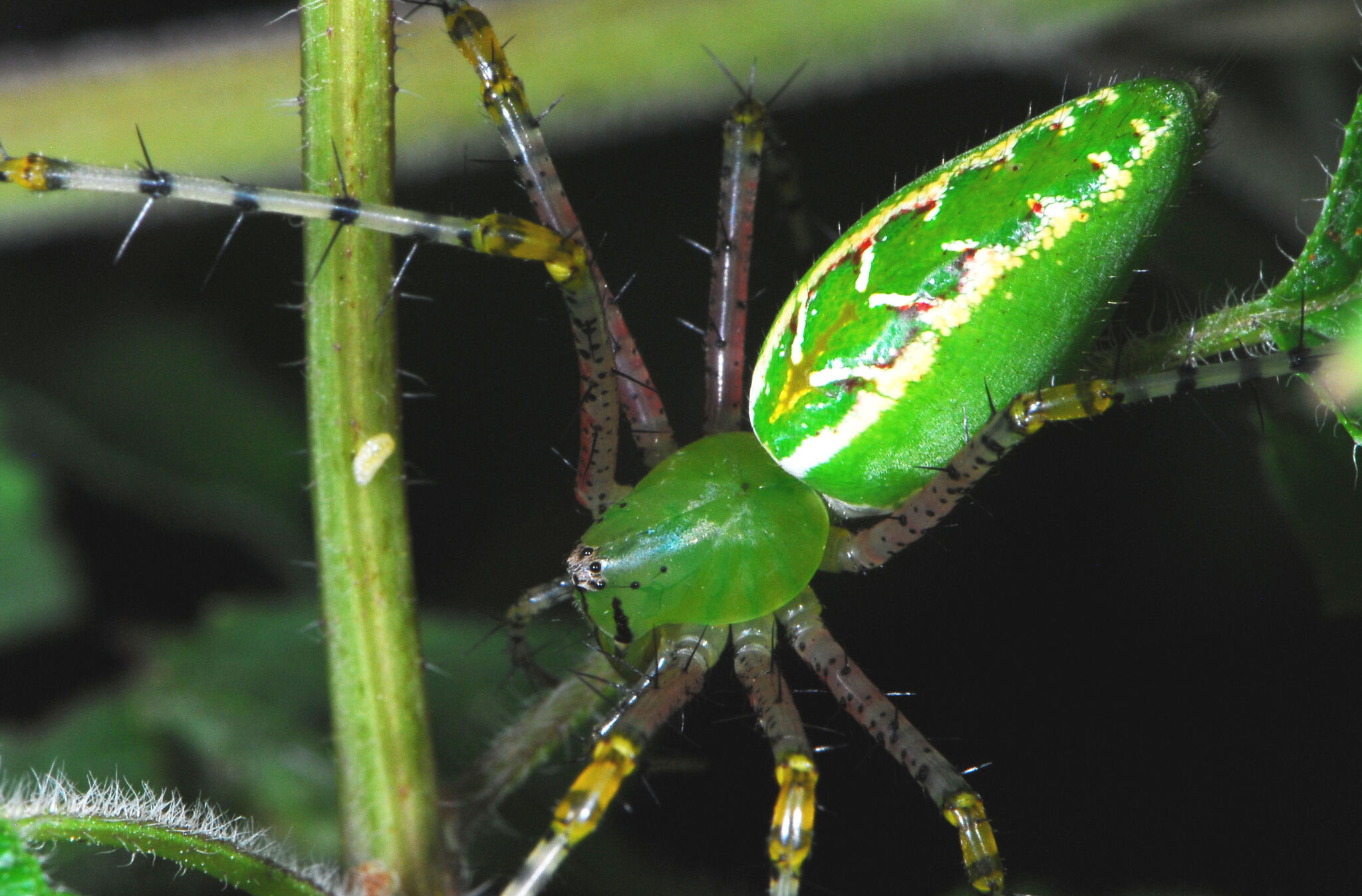
P. pulchra
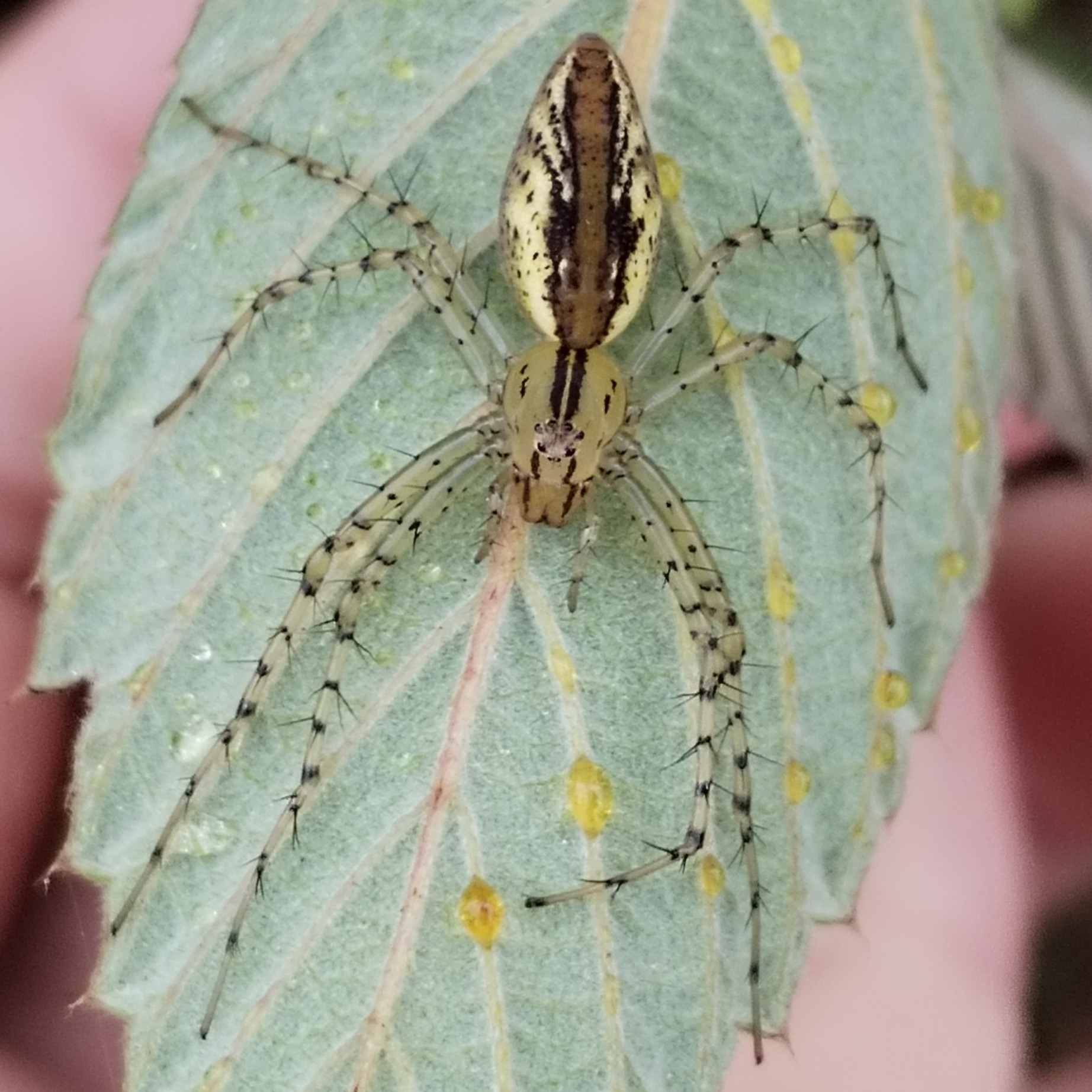
P. rubrolineata

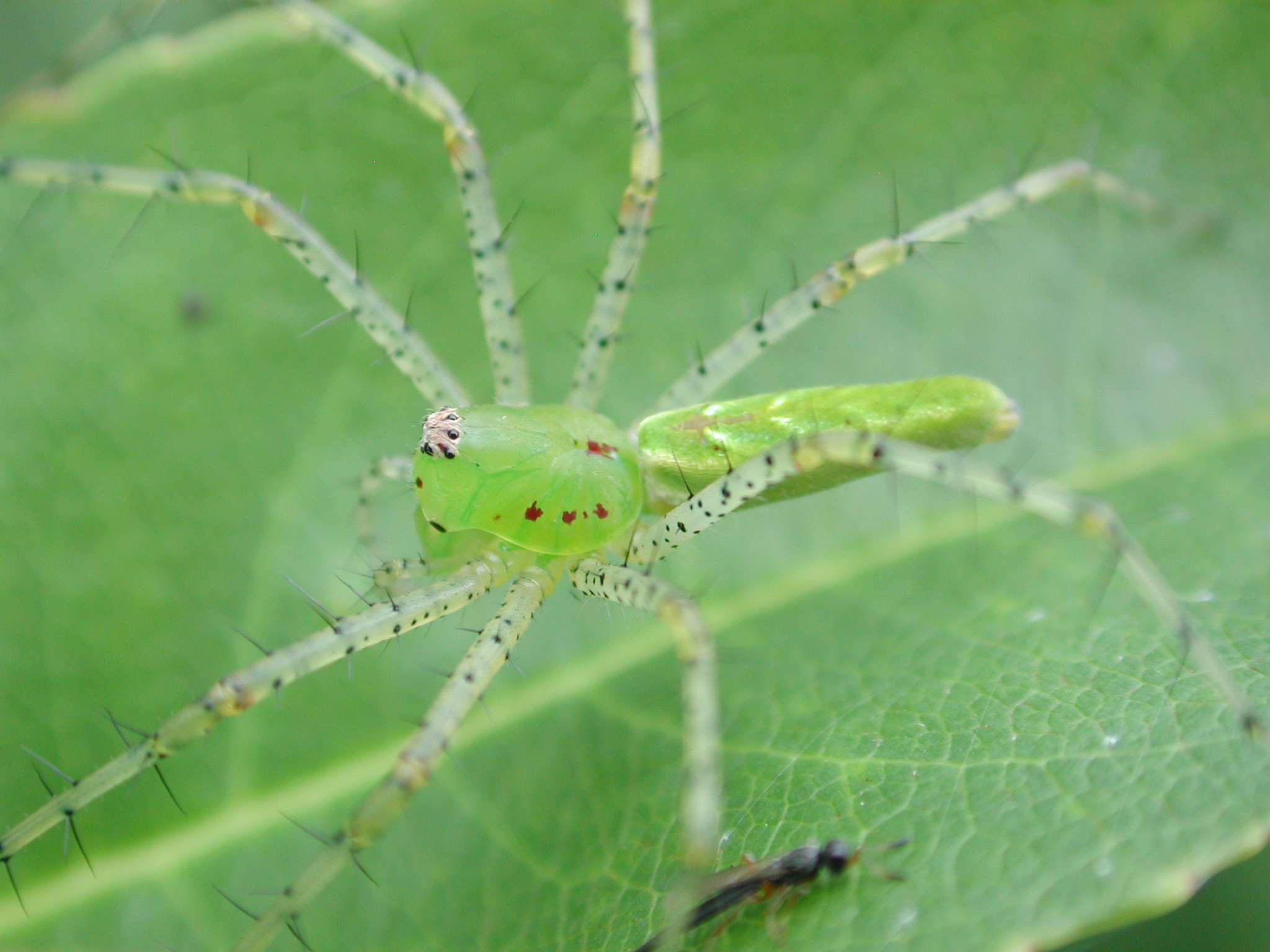
P. viridans

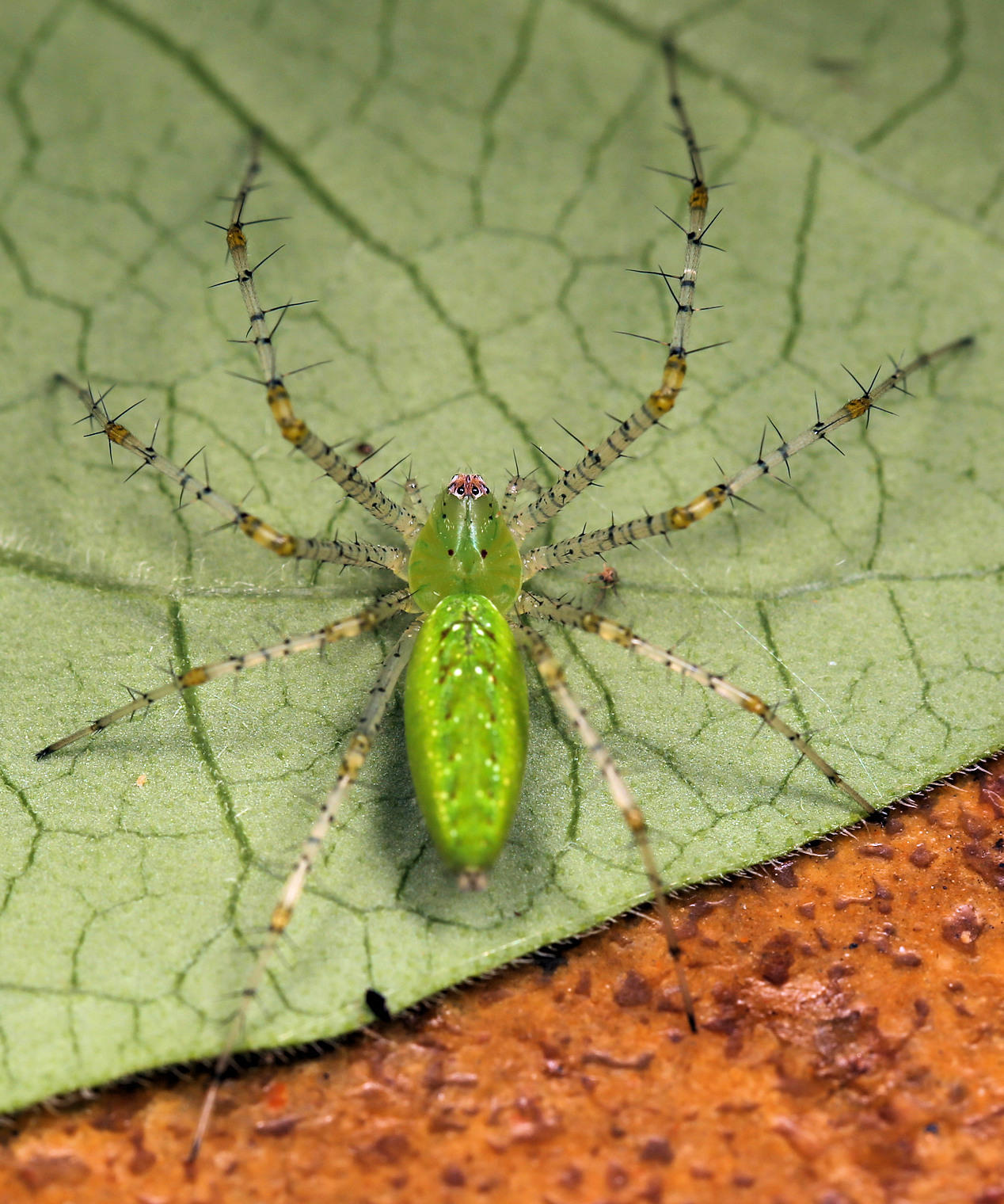
P. viridis

As of October 2025, this genus includes 47 species:

- Peucetia akwadaensis Patel, 1978 – India, China
- Peucetia albescens L. Koch, 1878 – Australia (Queensland)
- Peucetia ananthakrishnani Murugesan, Mathew, Sudhikumar, Sunish, Biju & Sebastian, 2006 – India
- Peucetia arabica Simon, 1882 – Greece, North, East Africa, Middle East
- Peucetia ashae Gajbe & Gajbe, 1999 – India
- Peucetia betlaensis Saha & Raychaudhuri, 2007 – India
- Peucetia biharensis Gajbe, 1999 – India
- Peucetia casseli Simon, 1900 – West, Central Africa
- Peucetia cayapa Santos & Brescovit, 2003 – Ecuador, Peru
- Peucetia chhaparajnirvin N. Kumari, V. Kumari, Bodhke & Zafri, 2024 – India
- Peucetia choprai Tikader, 1965 – India
- Peucetia crucifer Lawrence, 1927 – Namibia, Botswana, Zimbabwe, South Africa
- Peucetia flava Keyserling, 1877 – Venezuela to Argentina
- Peucetia formosensis Kishida, 1930 – Taiwan, Japan (Ryukyu Is.)
- Peucetia gauntleta Saha & Raychaudhuri, 2004 – India
- Peucetia gerhardi van Niekerk & Dippenaar-Schoeman, 1994 – Ivory Coast, Sudan, Ethiopia, DR Congo, Uganda
- Peucetia graminea Pocock, 1900 – India
- Peucetia harishankarensis Biswas, 1975 – India
- Peucetia jabalpurensis Gajbe & Gajbe, 1999 – India
- Peucetia ketani Gajbe, 1992 – India
- Peucetia latikae Tikader, 1970 – India, China, Taiwan
- Peucetia lesserti van Niekerk & Dippenaar-Schoeman, 1994 – Niger, Kenya
- Peucetia longipalpis F. O. Pickard-Cambridge, 1902 – USA to Venezuela
- Peucetia lucasi (Vinson, 1863) – Botswana, South Africa, Comoros, Mayotte, Madagascar
- Peucetia macroglossa Mello-Leitão, 1929 – Colombia, Brazil, Guyana
- Peucetia maculifera Pocock, 1900 – South Africa, Lesotho
- Peucetia madagascariensis (Vinson, 1863) – Comoros, Mayotte, Madagascar
- Peucetia madalenae van Niekerk & Dippenaar-Schoeman, 1994 – Mozambique, South Africa
- Peucetia margaritata Hogg, 1914 – Australia (Montebello Is.)
- Peucetia myanmarensis Barrion & Litsinger, 1995 – Myanmar
- Peucetia nicolae van Niekerk & Dippenaar-Schoeman, 1994 – South Africa
- Peucetia pawani Gajbe, 1999 – India
- Peucetia phantasma Ahmed, Satam, Khalap & Mohan, 2015 – India
- Peucetia procera Thorell, 1887 – Myanmar
- Peucetia pulchra (Blackwall, 1865) – Central, Eastern, Southern Africa, Seychelles
- Peucetia punjabensis Gajbe, 1999 – India
- Peucetia rajani Gajbe, 1999 – India
- Peucetia ranganathani Biswas & Roy, 2005 – India
- Peucetia rubrolineata Keyserling, 1877 – Panama to Argentina
- Peucetia striata Karsch, 1878 – Yemen to South Africa, Comoros. Introduced to St. Helena
- Peucetia transvaalica Simon, 1897 – Central, Southern Africa
- Peucetia virescens (O. Pickard-Cambridge, 1872) – Turkey, Middle East
- Peucetia viridana (Stoliczka, 1869) – Pakistan, India, Sri Lanka, Bangladesh, Myanmar
- Peucetia viridans (Hentz, 1832) – North & Central America, Caribbean, Venezuela
- Peucetia viridis (Blackwall, 1858) – Spain, Greece, Canary Islands, Africa, Middle East. Introduced to Caribbean Is. (type species)
- Peucetia viveki Gajbe, 1999 – India
- Peucetia yogeshi Gajbe, 1999 – India
