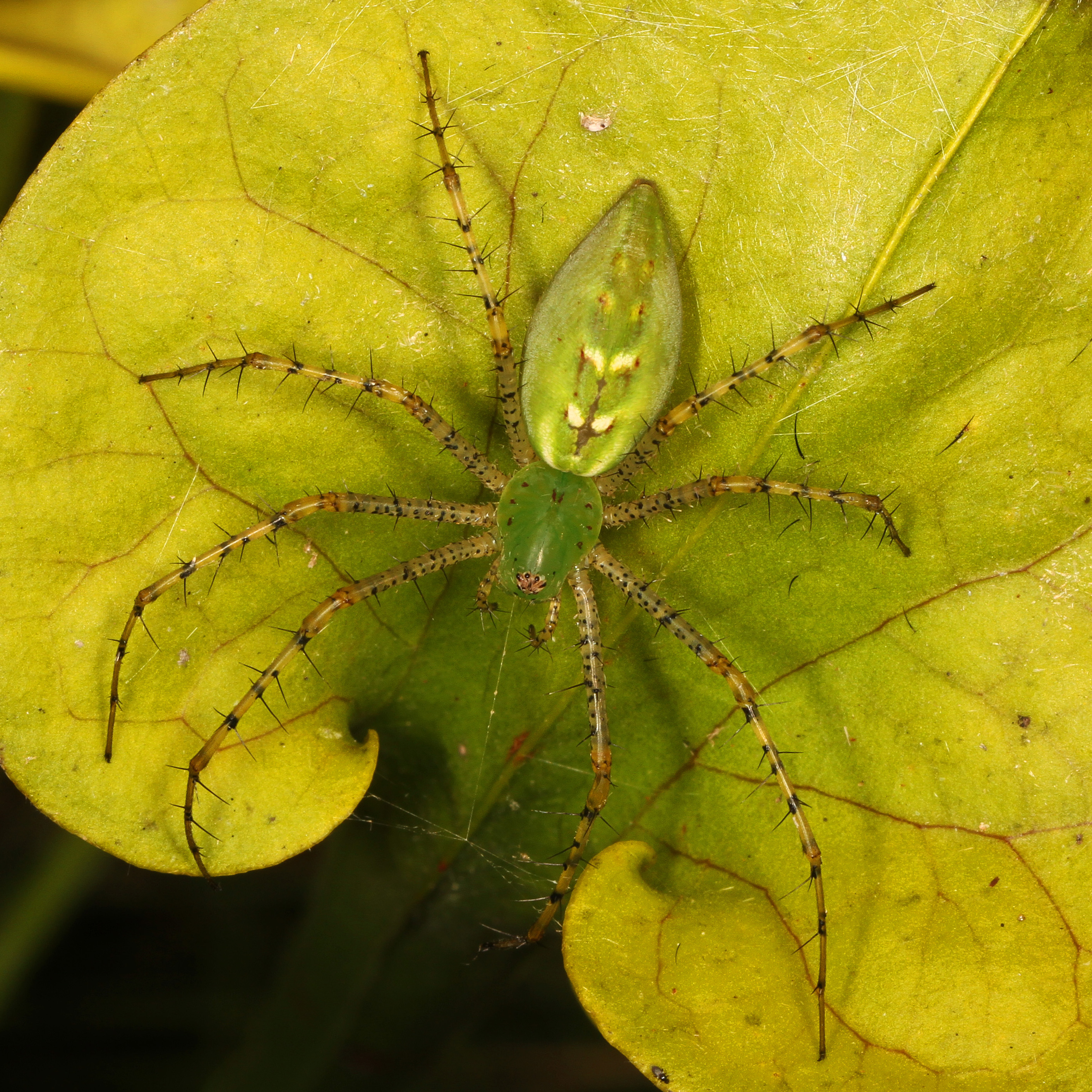
- On a Sarracenia pitcher plant, Green Swamp, North Carolina

Scientific classification
- Kingdom: Animalia
- Phylum: Arthropoda
- Subphylum: Chelicerata
- Class: Arachnida
- Order: Araneae
- Infraorder: Araneomorphae
- Family: Oxyopidae
- Genus: Peucetia
- Species: P. viridans

Binomial name
- Peucetia viridans (Hentz, 1832)

Synonyms
- List: Sphasus viridans; Clastes abbot; Clastes viridis; Clastes roseus; Oxyopes viridans; Sphasus poeyi; Peucetia thalassina; Peucetia aurora; Peucetia bibranchiata; Peucetia rubricapilla; Peucetia poeyi; Peucetia abboti

= Peucetia viridans =

Green lynx spider

Species of spider

Peucetia viridans, the green lynx spider, is a bright-green lynx spider usually found on green plants. This spider is common in the southern U.S., Mexico, Central America, and in many West Indies islands, especially Jamaica. Lynx spiders are hunters specialized for living on plants. This species does not use a web to capture its prey. It pounces on its prey in a cat-like manner, which is the reason for the name lynx. It is active during the day.

== Description ==
The body of the female may be as much as 22 millimeters (0.87 in) long. The male is smaller, being more slender and averaging 12 millimeters (0.47 in) in length. There often is a red patch between the eyes, with a few red spots on the body. The eye region is clothed with white appressed hairs. The dorsal surface of the abdomen bears about six Chevron-like marks with the centres pointing forward. The legs are green to yellow, bearing long black spines such as appear on the legs of most species of Oxyopidae, and with a generous scattering of black spots. Peucetia viridans is confusingly similar to Peucetia longipalpis, the other Peucetia species to occur in the United States, but Peucetia longipalpis tends to have a shorter, fatter, more domed abdomen, with less pronounced markings in its upper surface.

Late in the season Peucetia viridans is prone to change its colour from predominantly green to paler yellow, typically with streaks of reddish, suggesting degradation of the tetrapyrrole pigment in the blood. Gravid females may change their color to fit their background. This takes about 16 days.

Feeding behaviour

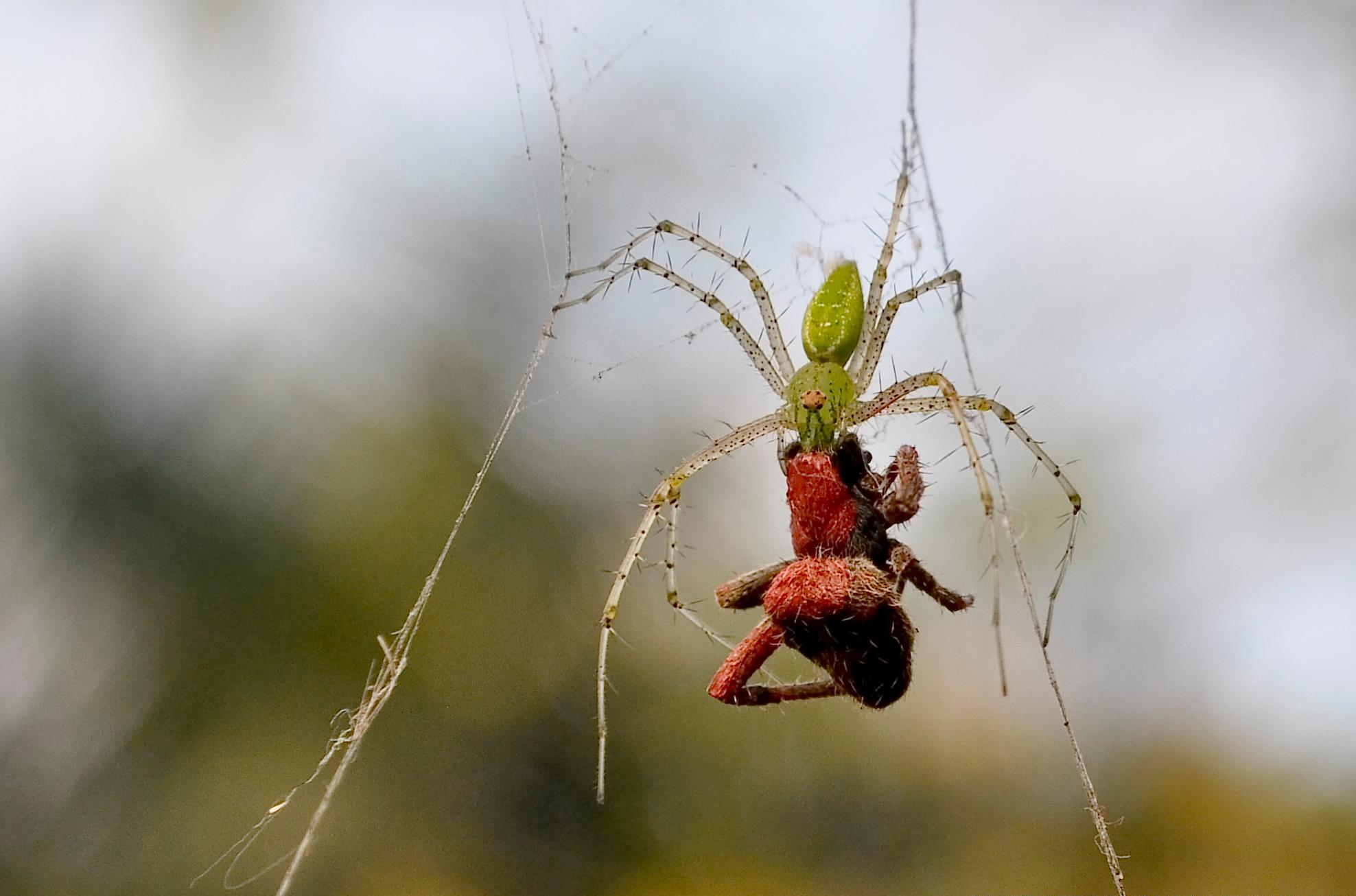
Green Lynx vs Pisauridae, IN

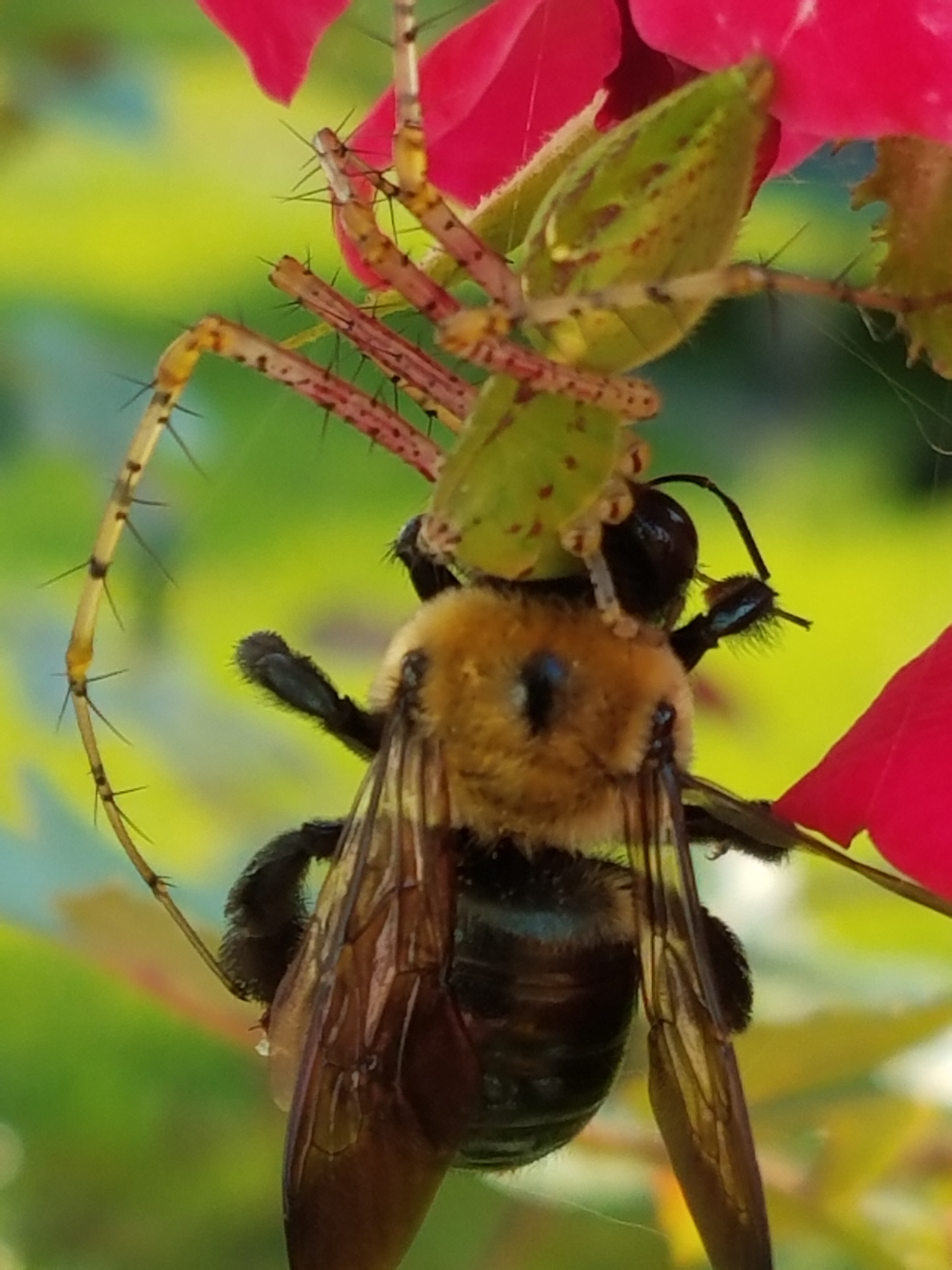
Female eating a carpenter bee prize in Fort Mill, SC

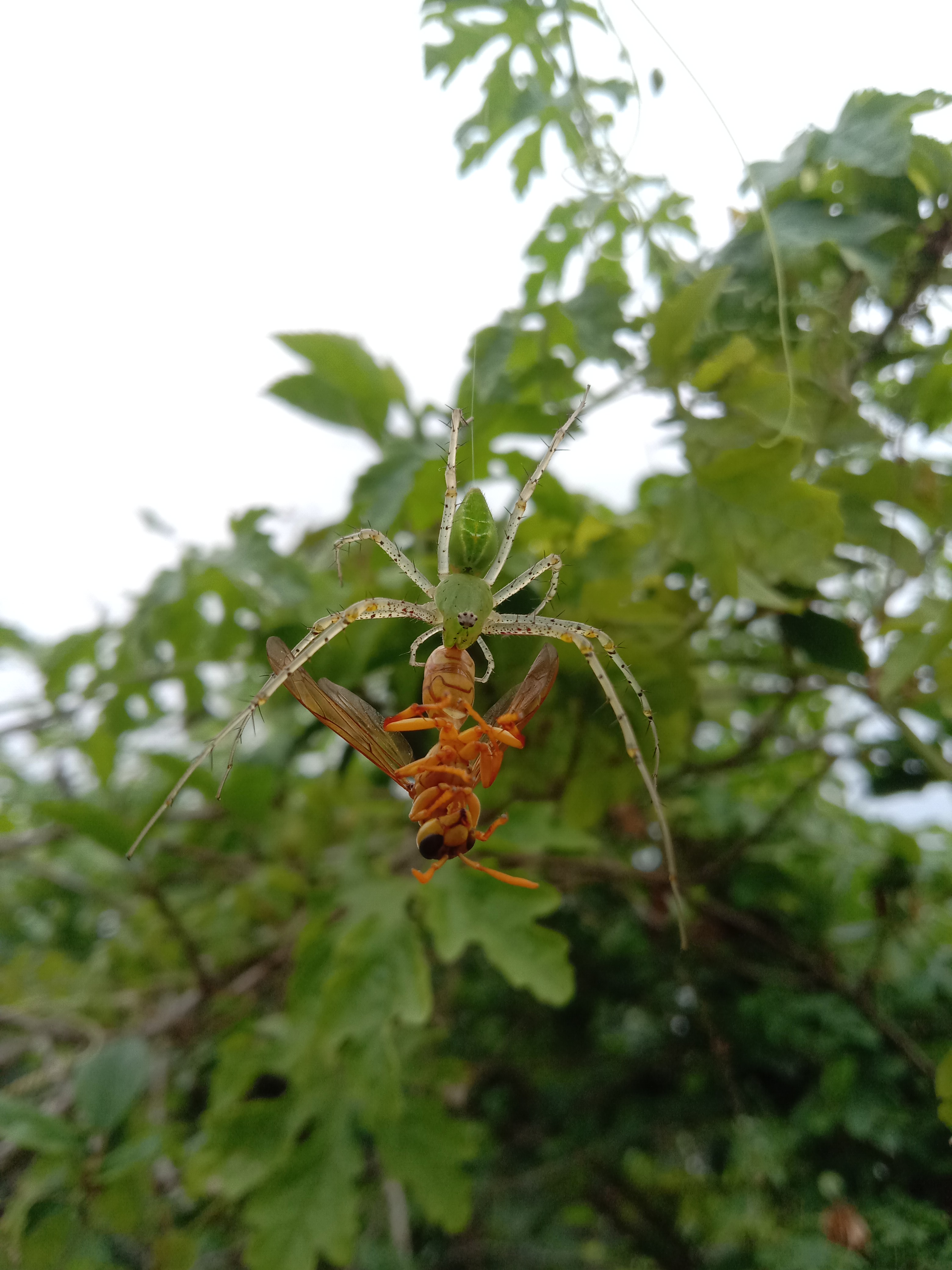
Eating a yellow paper wasp in West Bengal, India.

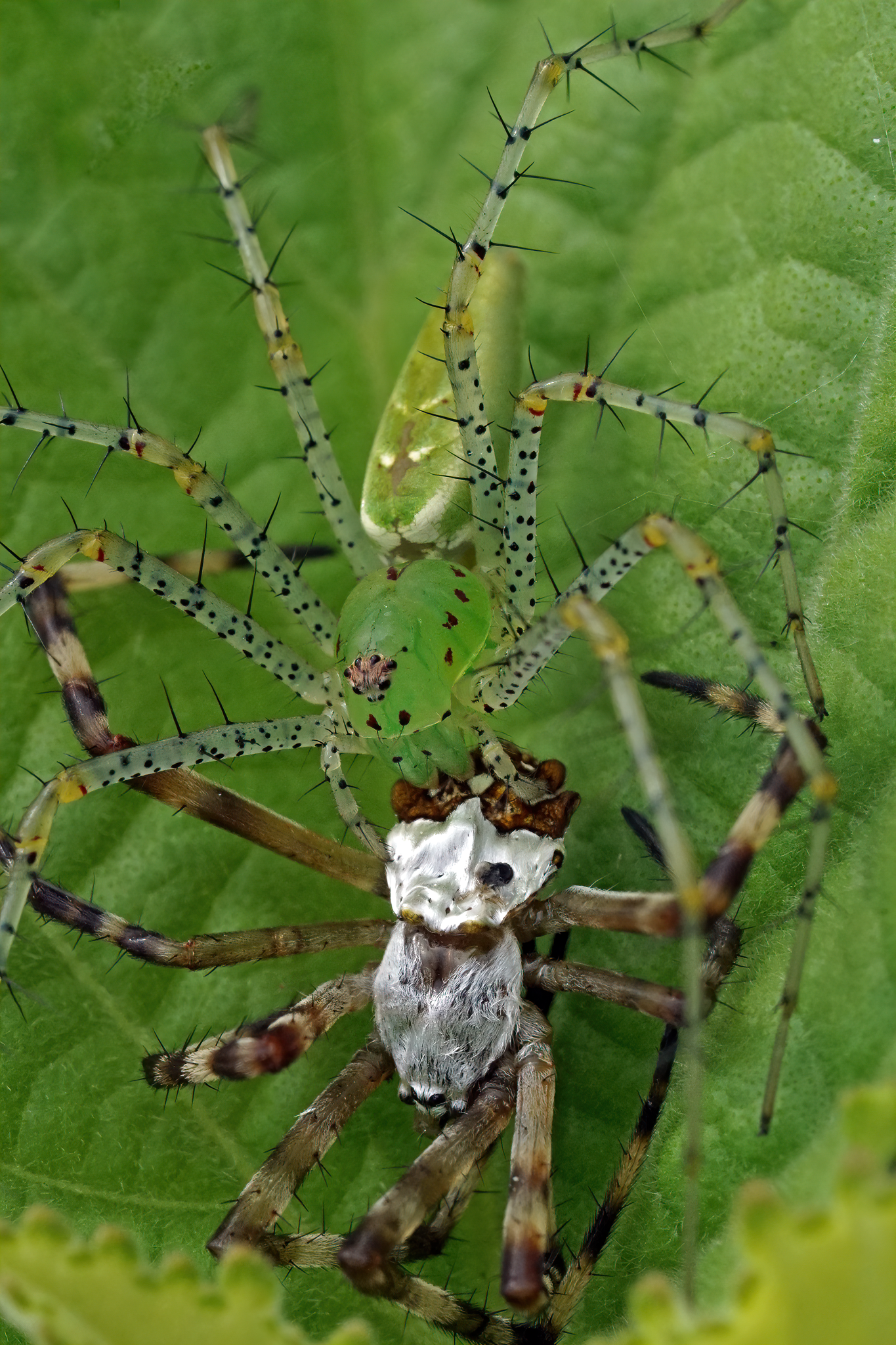
Eating a silver garden orbweaver

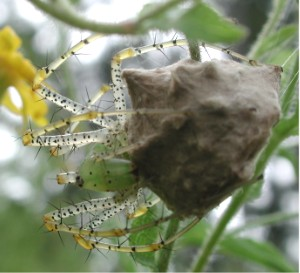
Female with egg sac

== Habits ==
The female constructs one to five 2-centimeter (0.8 in) egg sacs in September and October, each containing 25 to 600 bright orange eggs, which she guards, usually hanging upside down from a sac and attacking everything that comes near. Remarkably, one of her means of defense is to squirt (spit) venom from her chelicerae, sometimes for a distance of about a foot (300 mm). The eggs hatch after about two weeks, and after another two weeks fully functional spiderlings emerge from the sac. They pass through eight instars to reach maturity.

== Green lynx spiders and humans ==
The green lynx spider very seldom bites humans, and when it does, its venomous bite, though painful, is not deadly but it has caused a 25 mm (0.98 in) surrounding swelling (edema) in one patient and lasted two days, and a 10–20 cm (3.9–7.9 in) in diameter swelling in another patient.

The species is primarily of interest for its usefulness in agricultural pest management, for example in cotton fields. The spiders have been observed to hunt several moth species and their larvae, including some of the most important crop pests, such as the bollworm moth (Helicoverpa zea), the cotton leafworm moth (Alabama agrillacea), and the cabbage looper moth (Trichoplusia ni). However, they also prey on beneficial insects, such as honey bees.

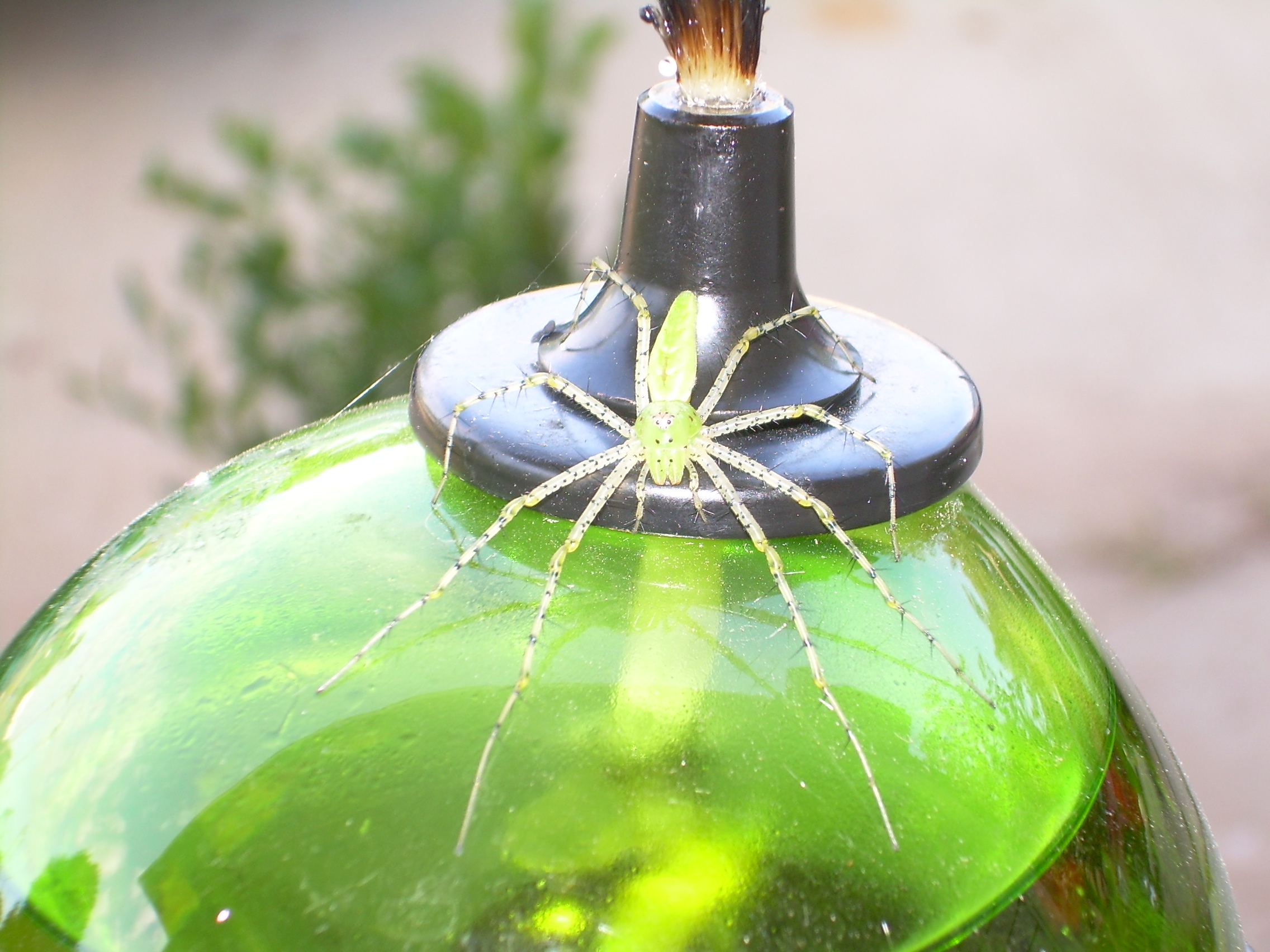
Photo showing relative sizes of legs

== Distribution ==
This species occurs in the southern United States, California, Mexico, Central America, the West Indies, and Venezuela.

== Name ==
The species name, viridans, is Latin for "becoming green". It should not be confused with either P. viridana, a species that occurs only in India and Myanmar, or P. viridis from Spain and Africa.

== Images ==
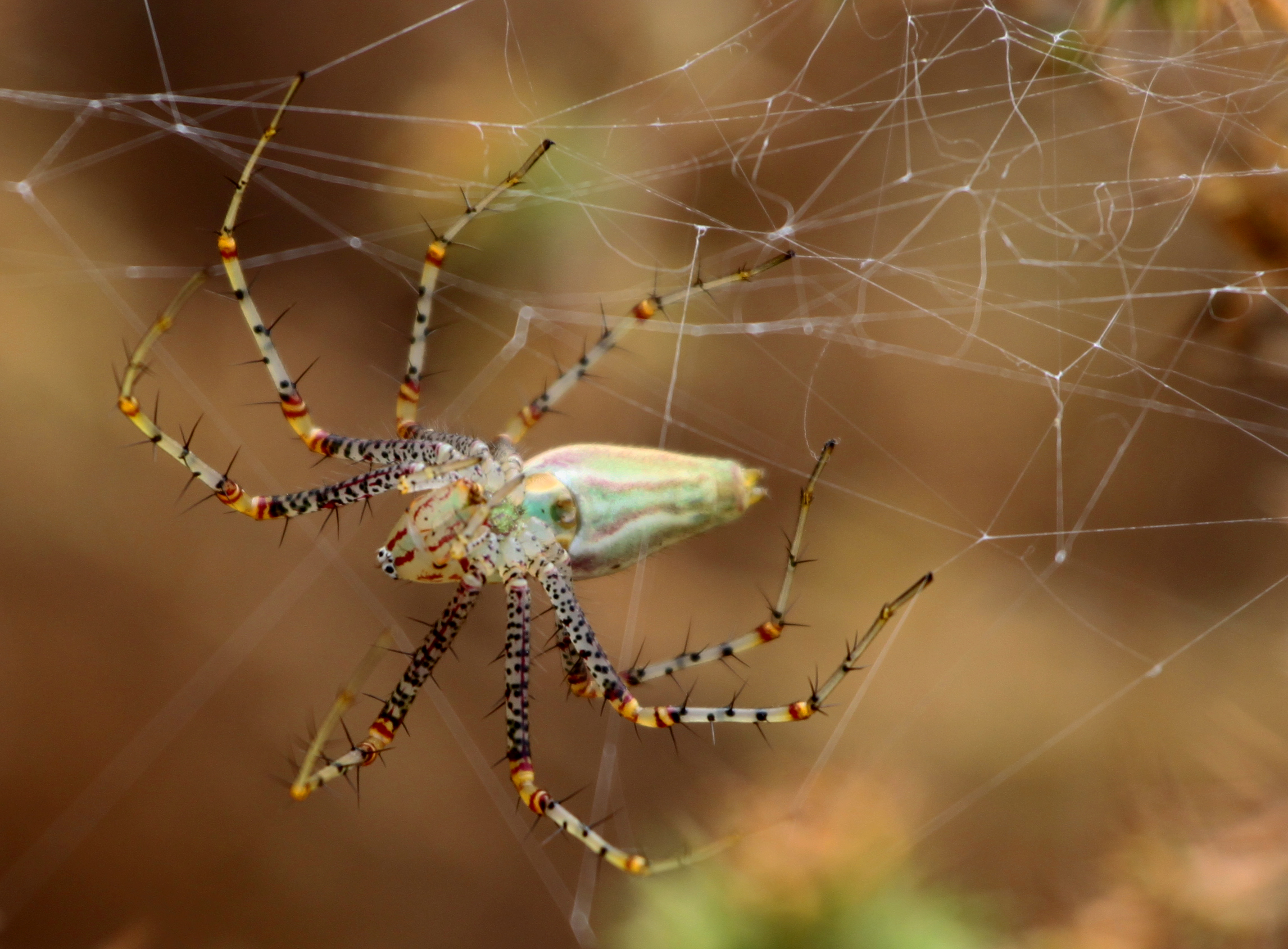
Female, Mason Regional Park, Irvine CA

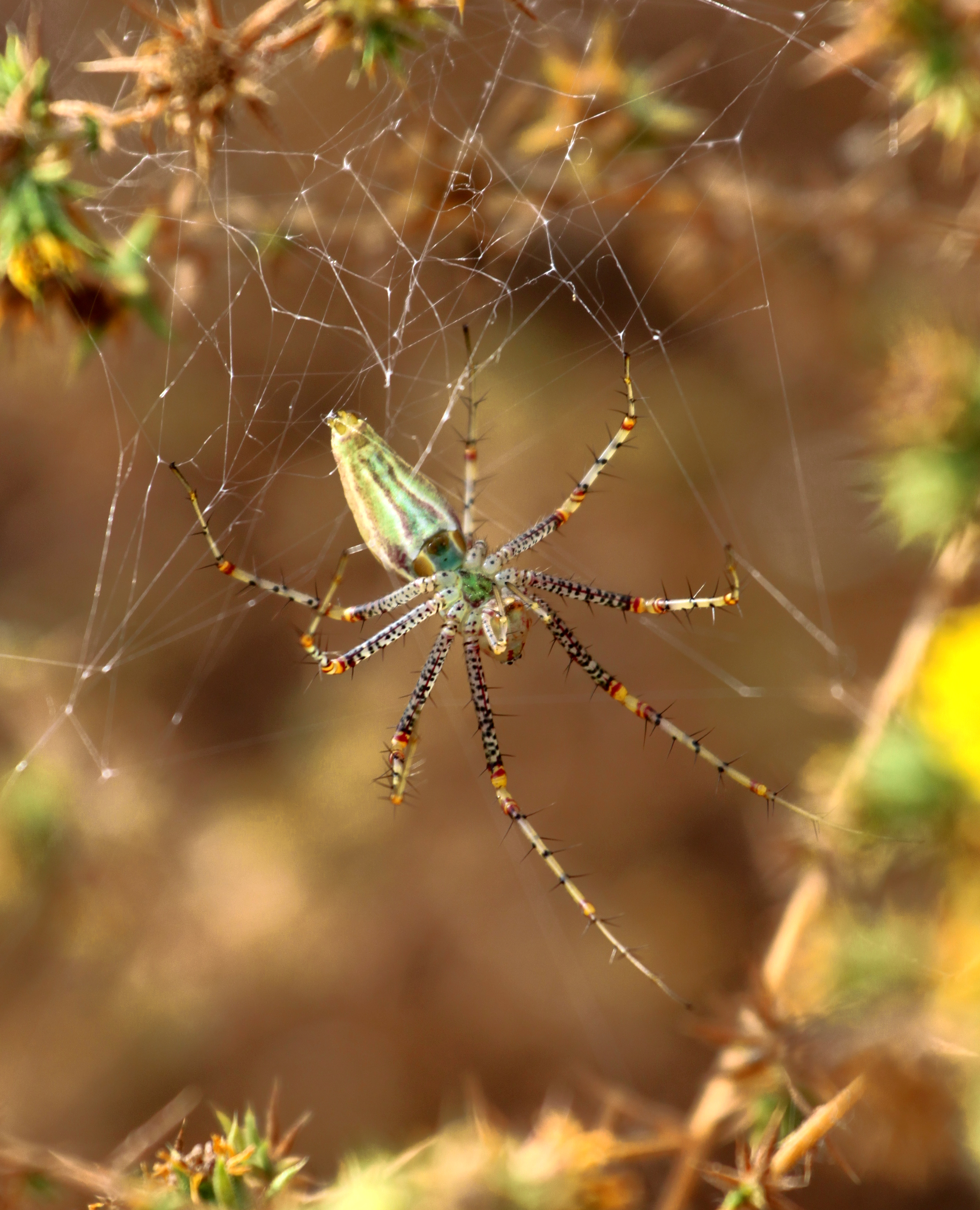
Female, Mason Regional Park, Irvine CA

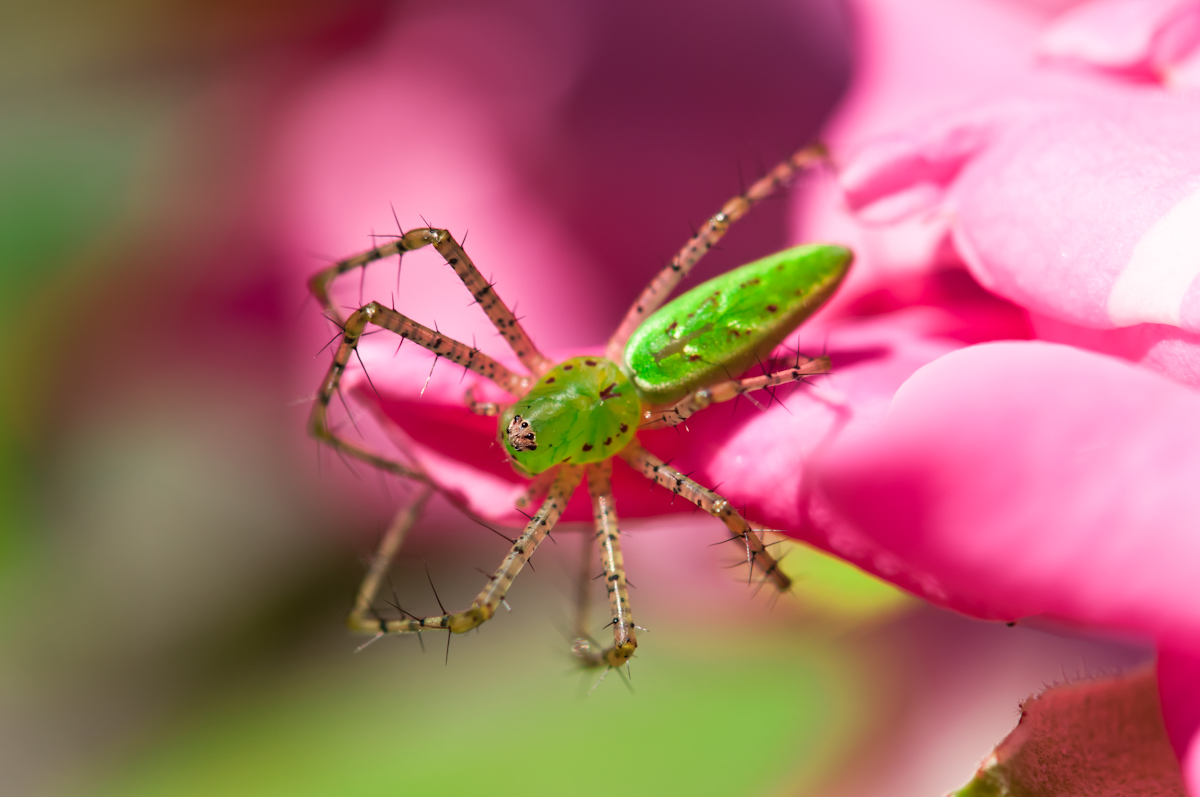
In Chesapeake, VA

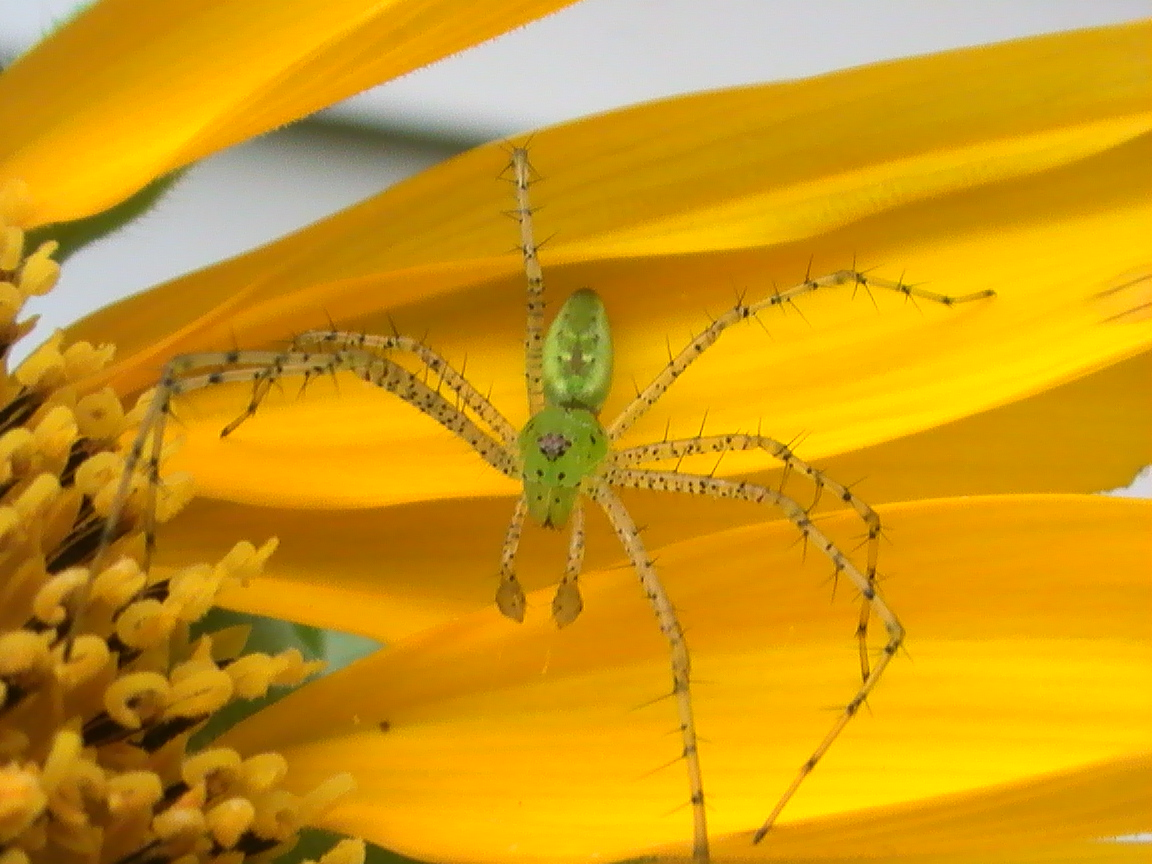
Male, Chesapeake, VA

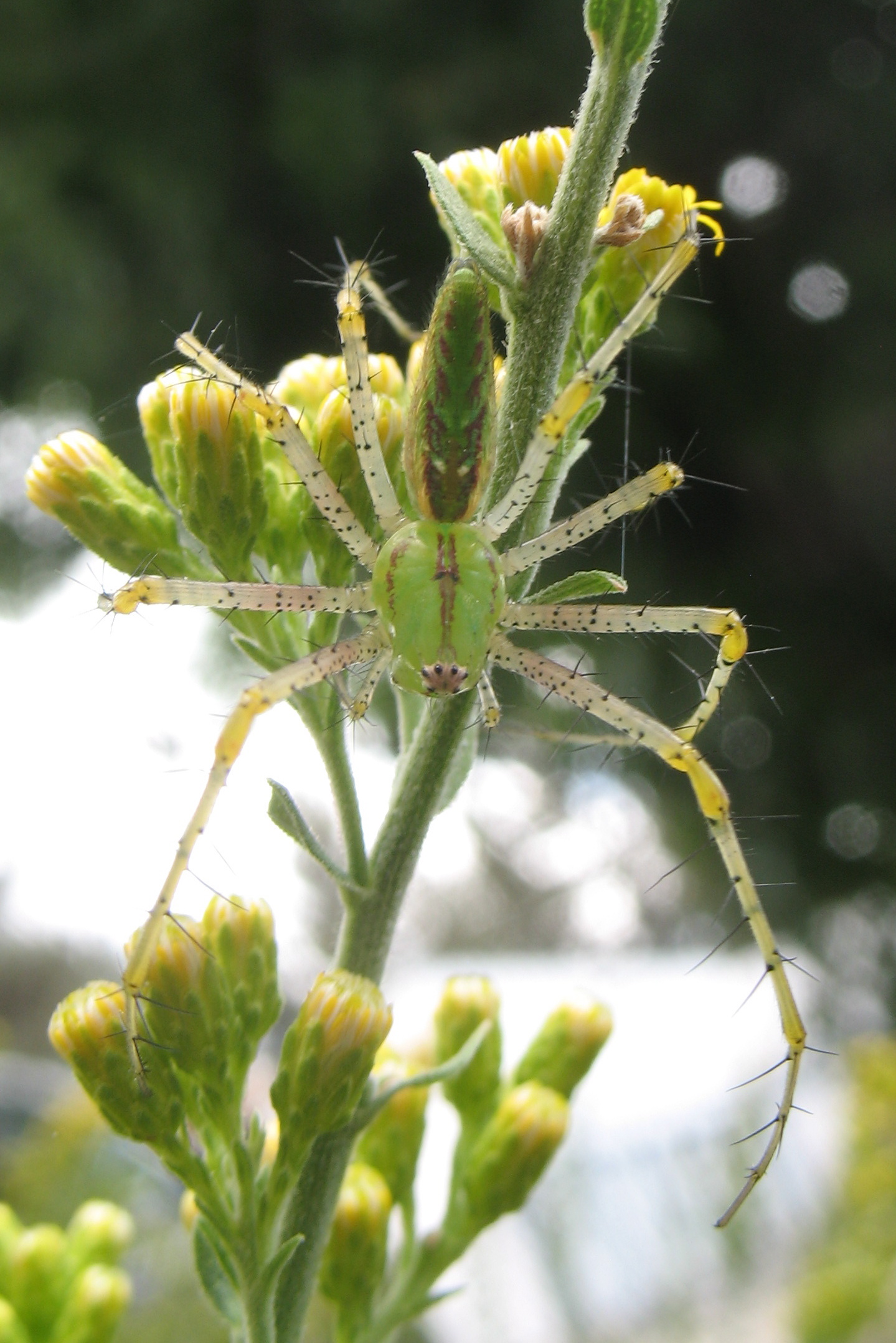
In a garden, Big Bear City, CA 92314

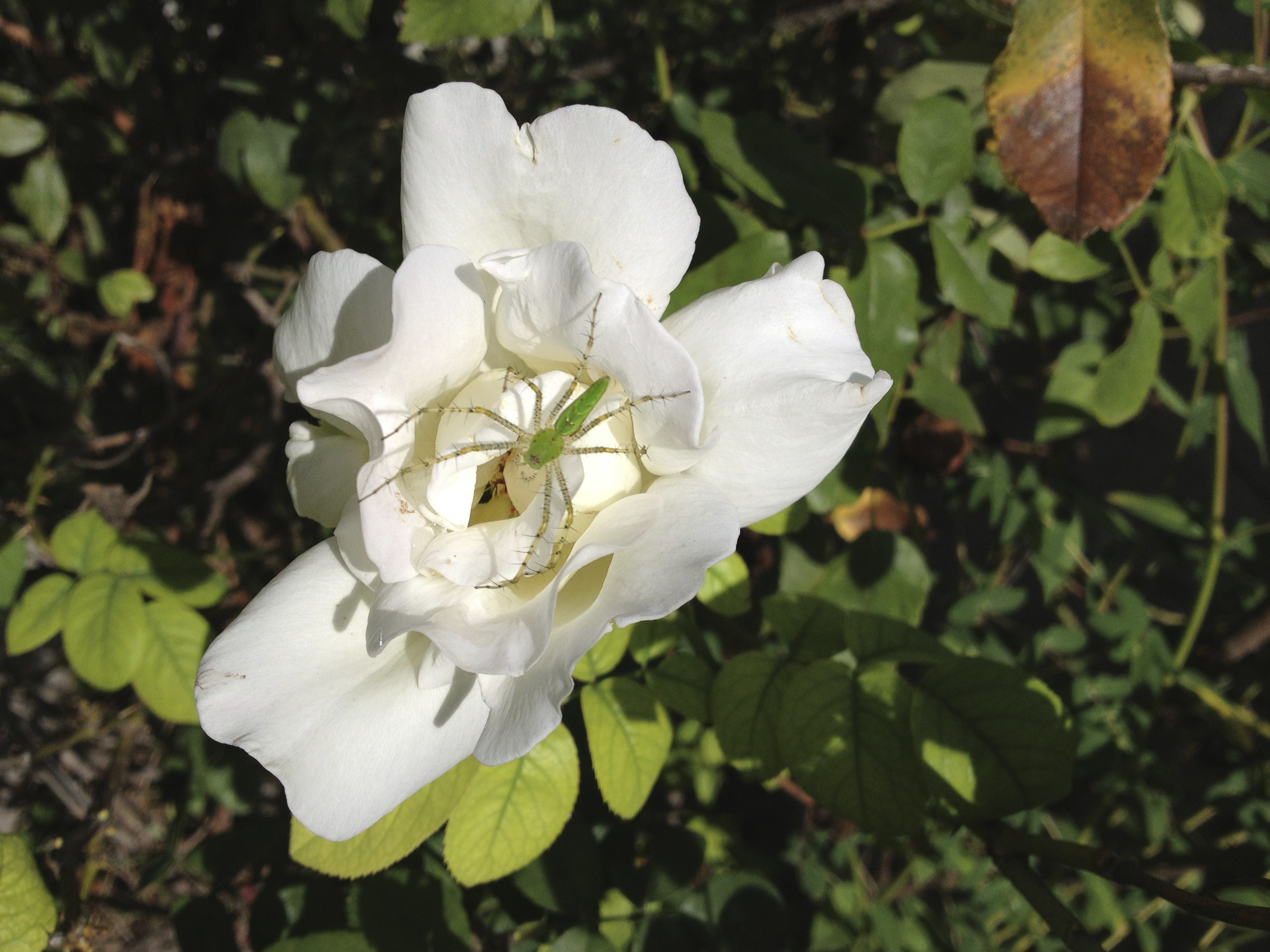

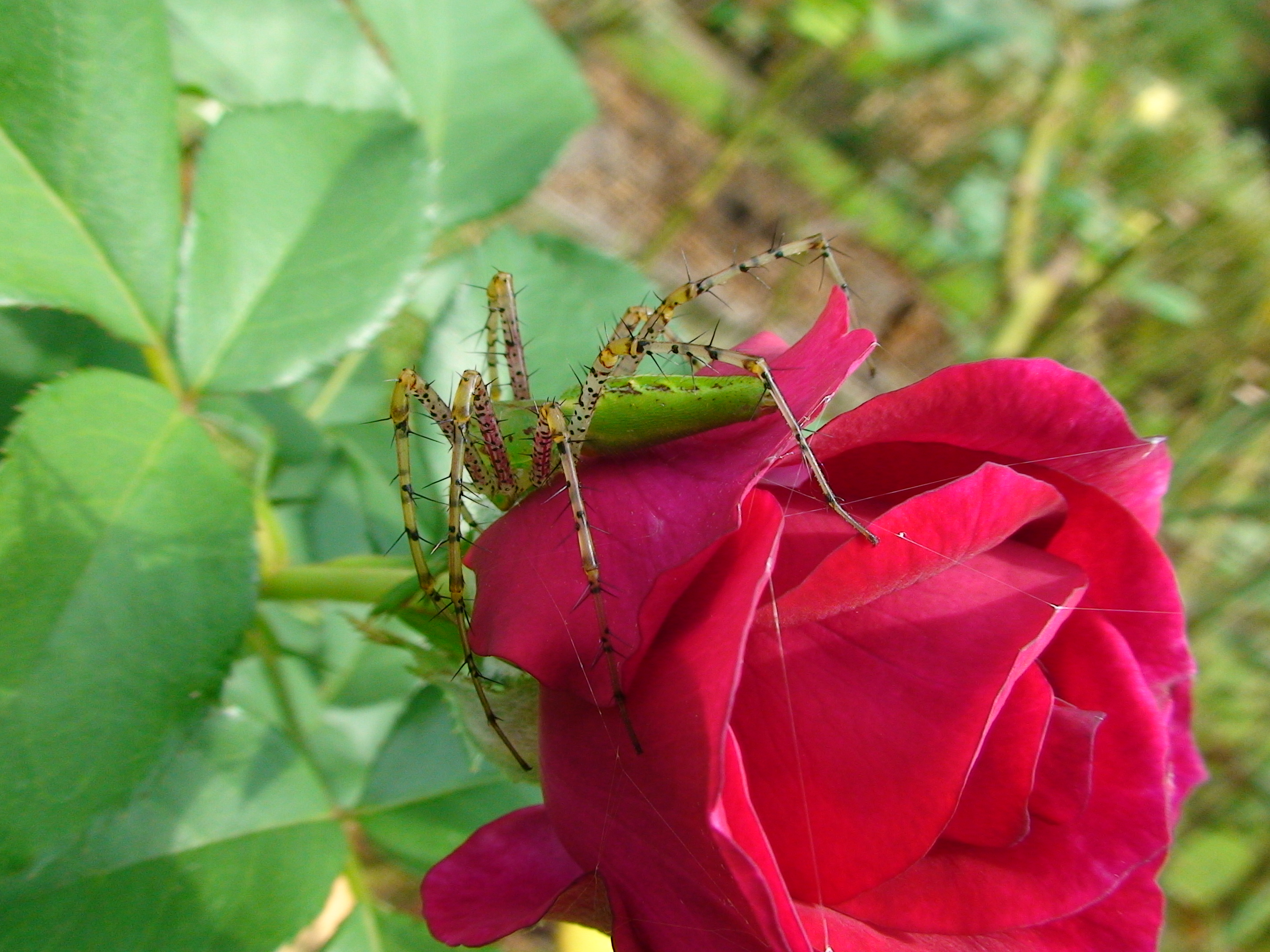
On a rose in Tyler, Texas

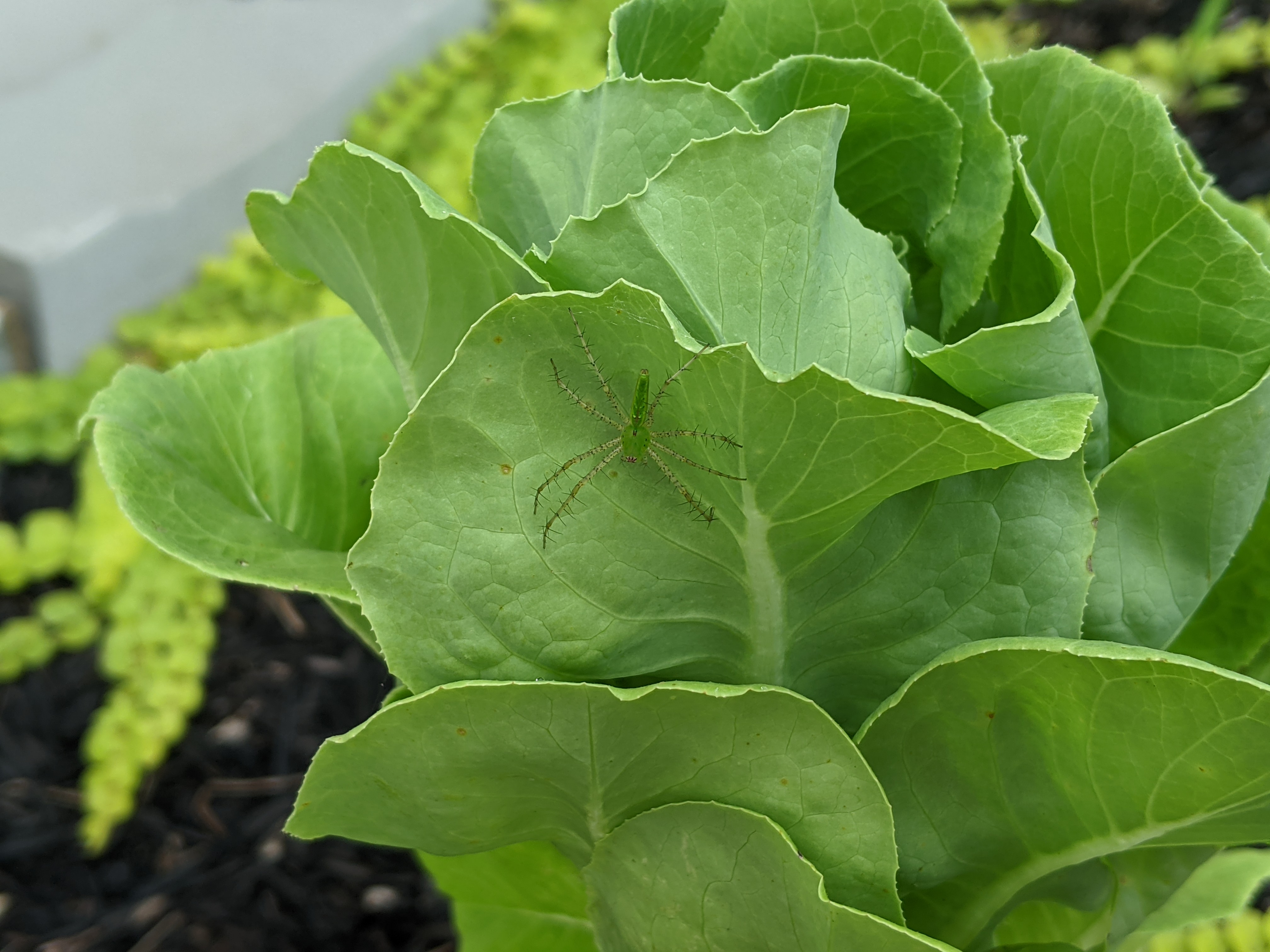
In North Houston, TX

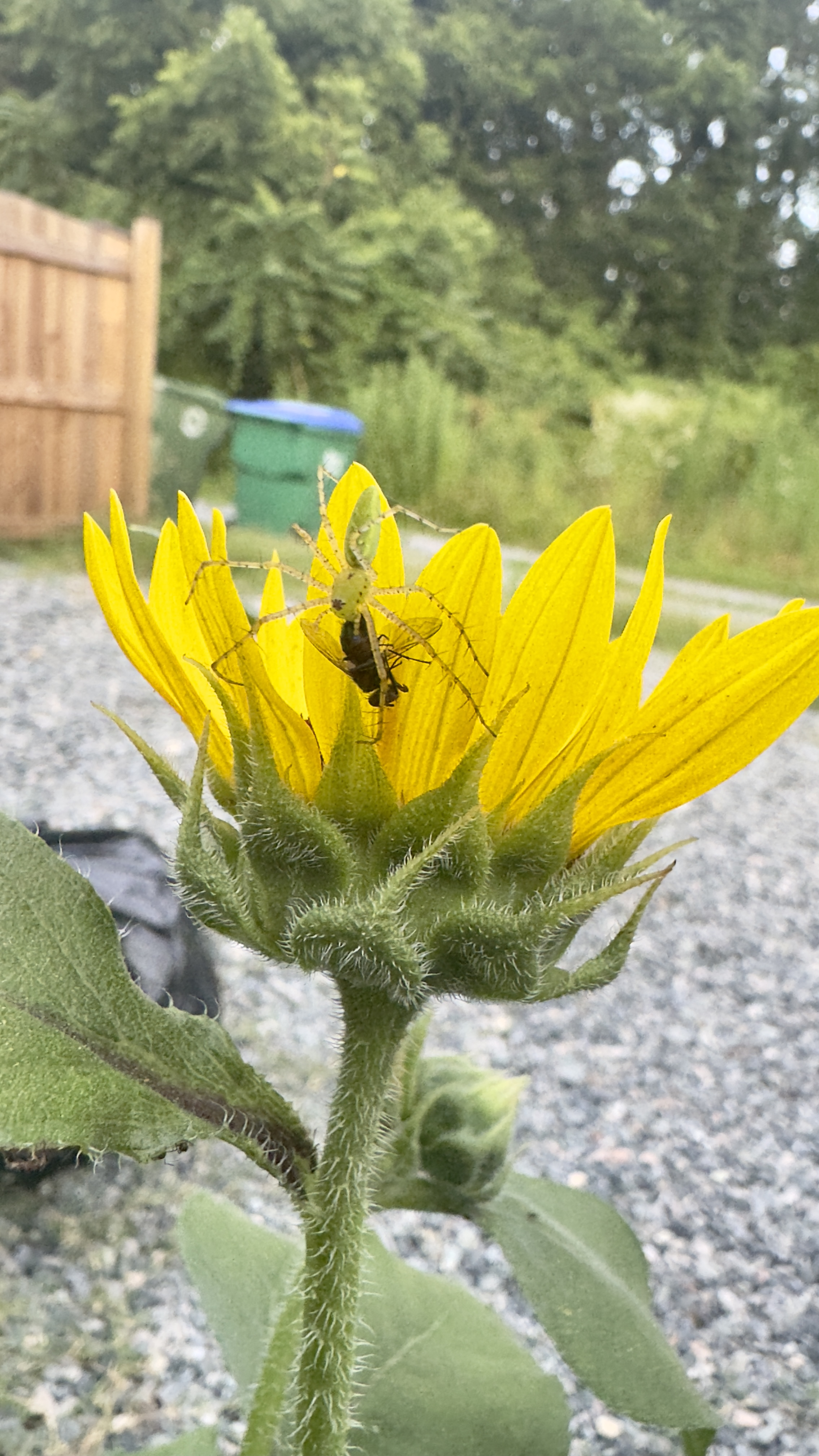
Male, Church Hill, Richmond VA
