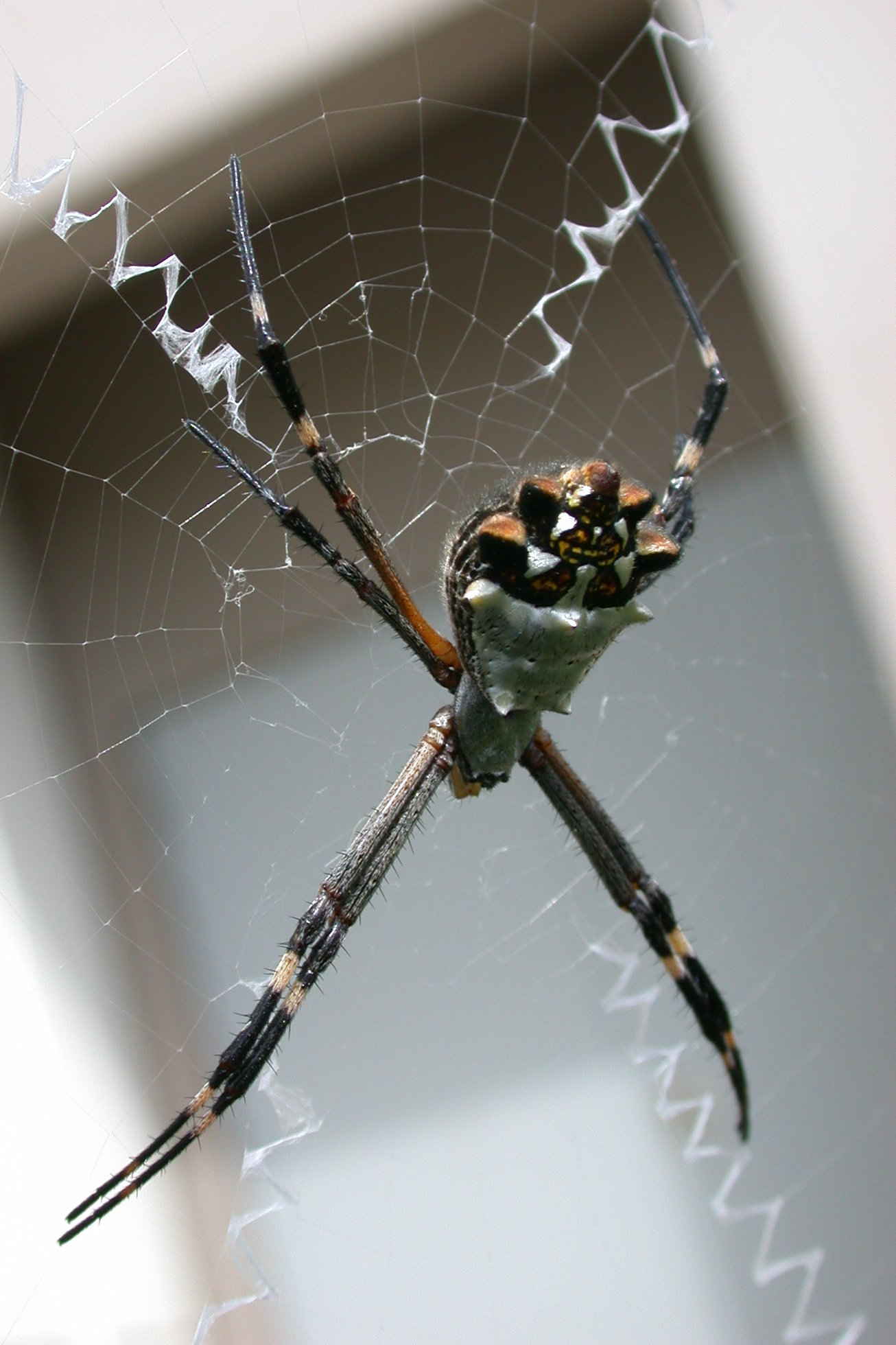
- Female in California (dorsal side)

Scientific classification
- Kingdom: Animalia
- Phylum: Arthropoda
- Subphylum: Chelicerata
- Class: Arachnida
- Order: Araneae
- Infraorder: Araneomorphae
- Family: Araneidae
- Genus: Argiope
- Species: A. argentata

Binomial name
- Argiope argentata (Fabricius, 1775)

Synonyms
- List: Aranea argentata Fabricius, 1775; Aranea mammeata De Geer, 1778; Aranea mammata Olivier, 1789; Epeira mammata (Olivier, 1789); Argyopes argentatus (Fabricius, 1775); Argyopes fenestrinus C. L. Koch, 1838; Epeira argentata (Fabricius, 1775); Epeira amictoria Walckenaer, 1841; Plectana sloanii Walckenaer, 1841; Epeira gracilis Keyserling, 1865; Argiope carinata L. Koch, 1871; Argyopes maronicus Taczanowski, 1873; Argyopes subtilis Taczanowski, 1873; Acrosoma sloanii (Walckenaer, 1841); Argyopes hirtus Taczanowski, 1879; Argiope waughi Simon, 1896; Araneus gracilis (Keyserling, 1865); Micrathena sloanei Petrunkevitch, 1911; Gea panamensis Chamberlin, 1917; Argiope argyrea Badcock, 1932; Argiope cuyunii Hingston, 1932; Argiope filiargentata Hingston, 1932; Argiope filinfracta Hingston, 1932; Micrathena sloani Mello-Leitão, 1932; Singa gracilis (Keyserling, 1865); Aranea gracilenta Roewer, 1942; Argiope indistincta Mello-Leitão, 1944; Argiope hirta (Taczanowski, 1879)

= Argiope argentata =

Species of spider

Argiope argentata, commonly known as the silver argiope or silver garden spider due to the silvery color of its cephalothorax, is a member of the orb-weaver spider family Araneidae. This species resides in arid and warm environments in North America, Central America, the Caribbean and widely across South America. In the United States, it is found at least in Southern California, Florida, Arizona, and Texas. A. argentata create stabilimenta and a unique zig-zag in its web design, and it utilizes its UV-reflecting silk to attract pollinating species to prey upon. Like other species of Argiope, its venom is not harmful to humans; however, it can be employed to immobilize its prey. A. argentata engages in sexual cannibalism either mid- or post-copulation. One aspect of particular interest regarding this species is its extinction patterns, which notably have minimal correlation with its population size but rather occur sporadically for the species.

== Description ==
Argiope argentata belongs to the genus Argiope. As with all Argiope, there is notable sexual dimorphism in regards to size, with the male being much smaller than the female. The average size of the female A. argentata is 12 millimeters, which is three times the size of the average male. UV-light reflects off of the top surface of their bodies. This UV-reflectance may serve the same purpose as the UV-silk used to spin their webs: to attract pollinating prey by imitating the characteristics of flowers. The under-area of A. argentata has a dark-brown coloring, with a yellow stripe going across it. A. argentata has two sets of eyes: a primary set and a secondary set.

== Habitat and distribution ==
Argiope argentata are native to areas of Southern California. It is also found southwards as far as Argentina and Chile. As a spider that is attracted to dry and humid environments, it thrives on the prickly-pear plants of Southern California. This spider is not typically found in Europe, or in places with seasons that involve cooler temperatures. This spider is relatively abundant within its distribution. Argiope argentata are commonly seen and photographed by hikers in Southern California and the Andes Mountains.

== Hunting and diet ==
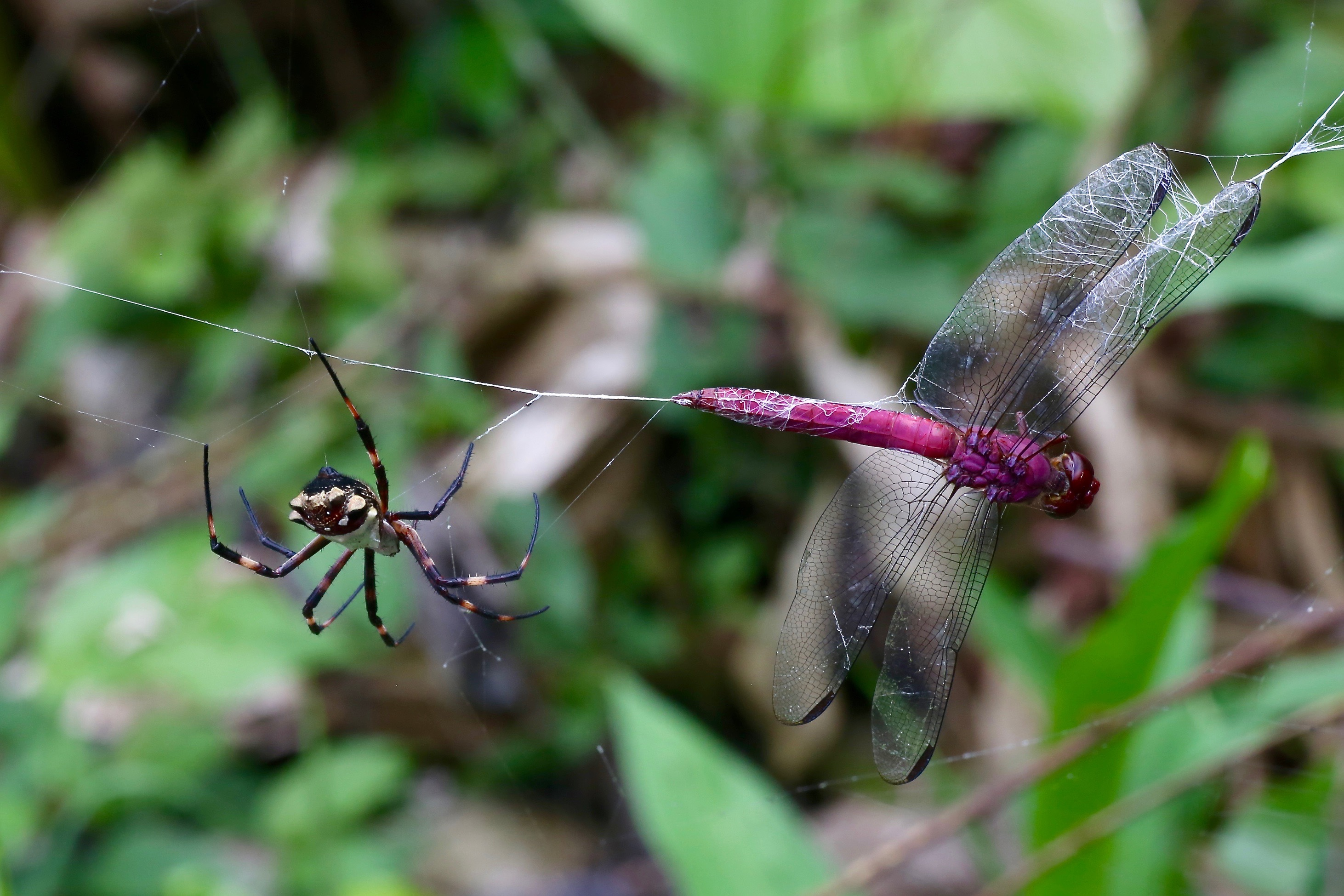
With carmine skimmer

=== Hunting ===
Argiope argentata follows a distinct sequence of steps when capturing, killing, and ultimately eating its prey. The first step is localization of the prey, for which the spider's vibration receptors are critical. The second step is immobilization of the prey which involves two steps: wrapping and biting. The second step consists of either a long or short bite depending on the type of prey. The third step is transportation, which involves carrying the prey back to where the spider was alarmed of its presence. In the fourth and final step before feeding, the spider manipulates the orientation of the prey so that it is in the proper positioning for the spider to consume.

The determining bite length is an important component of prey immobilization. It is determined by the spider by momentarily touching the prey before biting. This contact allows the spider to determine in some manner what the prey is, and what its immobilization will entail.

=== Biting prey ===
Argiope argentata exhibits two different forms of biting to its prey, which are differentiated by the duration of the bite: the short bite versus the long bite. For Lepidoptera, i.e. moths and butterflies, A. argentata performs a long bite, in contrast to the short bite given to other insects. Another juxtaposition between these two methods of predation is that the long bite is executed before the prey is wrapped in silk, whereas the short bite is executed after. One hypothesis for the difference in bite duration is that the long bite utilizes the spider's venom to immobilize the prey, whereas the short bite is unnecessary because the prey has already been immobilized by the silk wrapping.

Since the short bite is given after the prey has been immobilized by other tactics, a separate hypothesis for its purpose has been proposed. For starters, the venomous content in this bite is likely to be slim to none. Since the prey is already immobilized and dead, venom is not necessary and would be a waste of the A. argentata's predatorial resources. Rather, this short bite may serve as a "taste-tester" for the spider. This "taste-tester" supposedly gives the A. argentata sufficient information on the prey it has caught to determine whether or not it is consumable.

=== Diet ===
Argiope argentata eats butterflies and moths, both of which require a long bite upon first encounter. This is contrary to other insects that are immediately wrapped in silk. It also preys upon mosquitoes, grasshoppers, and flies.

The species incorporates UV-reflecting silks into its web design which serve as an attractor to their prey. These patterns have been hypothesized to specifically attract prey that engage in pollination. Flowers incorporate UV-reflecting patterns to ensure their pollination by insects.

== Webs and silk ==
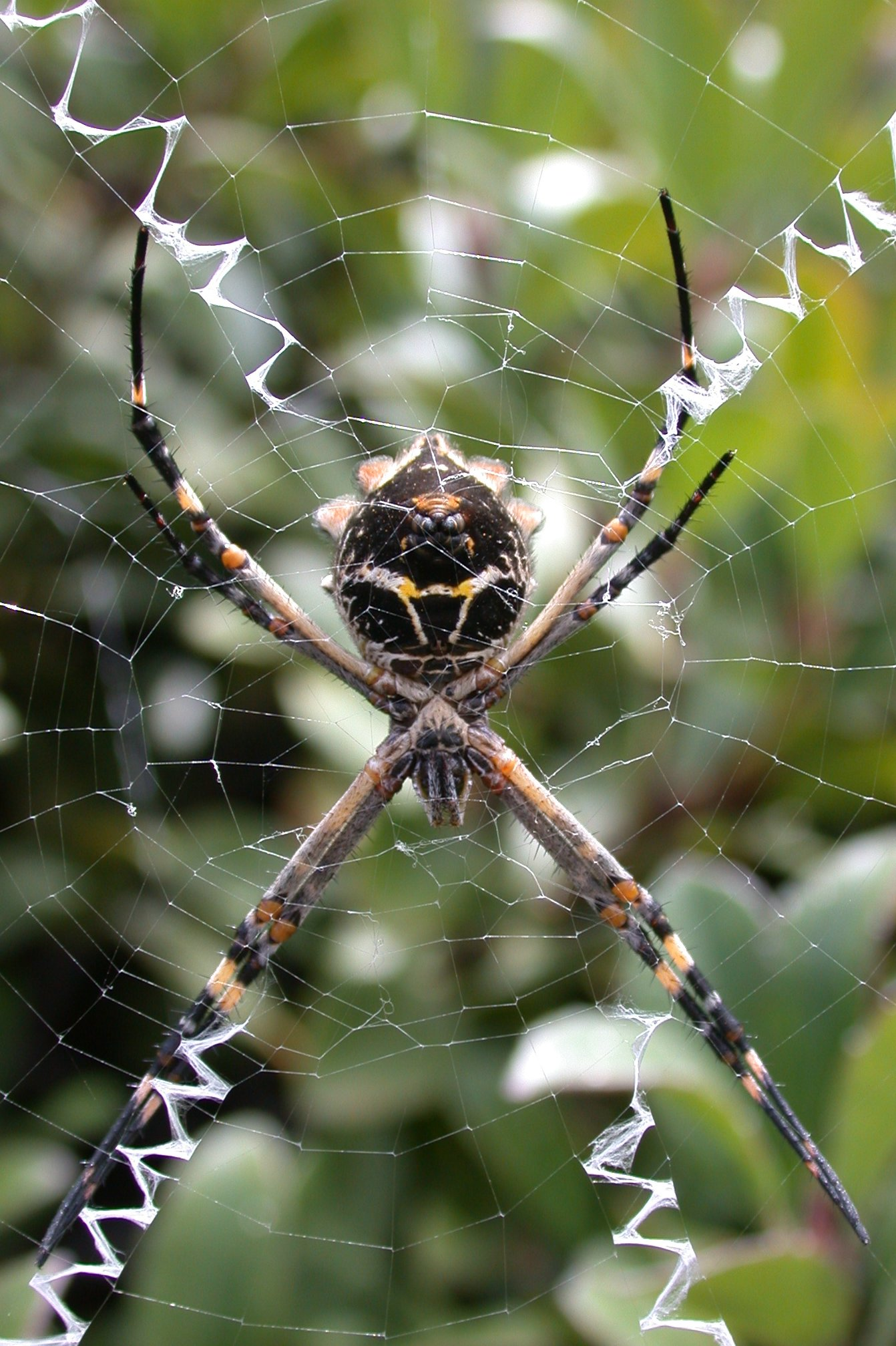
Female in web, California

=== Webs ===
Like other members of Argiope, silver argiopes often spin stabilimenta into their webs. These often take the form of zigzag lines, and frequently there are four of them forming a centerless "X" shape near the center of the web; the spider then rests in the very middle, with four pairs of legs each drawn together and splayed out in an "X" shape more or less aligned with the stabilimentum "X".

==== Decorations ====
There are multiple hypotheses regarding the reasoning behind A. argentata web decorations. Evidence shows that in part this web-decoration is utilized to attract prey. Further hypotheses center on the idea that the UV reflective capabilities of the web divert and deter birds from crashing into it. Thus, A. argentata might be able to save itself the resources and energy needed to rebuild its web. Despite hypotheses that the web is also used in part as a defense measure against predators, evidence shows that the decorations can also attract them. This is supported by the statistical analysis of degree of web decoration in association with survival rate. High degrees of decoration correlate to a lower survival rate than moderate to minimal degrees of decoration.

=== Silks ===
Argiope argentata is in the family Araneidae, otherwise known as orb-weavers. Like other orb-weavers, A. argentata has seven distinct silks, five of which are fibrous. These silks differ in many ways including the silk gland they are ejected from, their mechanical properties, and their protein composition. Four of the fibrous silks, aciniform, major ampullate, minor ampullate, and tubiliform, are considered dry silks, and the remaining fibrous silk, capture spiral, is considered a wet silk.

== Reproduction ==
=== Sexual cannibalism ===
Argiope argentata spider engages in sexual cannibalism, during or after copulation, without fail. The act of sexual cannibalism amongst A. argentata has been looked at more closely in the laboratory with virgin females. Upon the first attempt at mating, the female spider thrusts the male spider off of her, which results in his death more than two-thirds of the time. Males that survive, bravely try again, this time with success, only to be met with immediate cannibalism after the act of insemination is completed.

=== Plugging ===
As a consequence of post-coital cannibalism, males generally have a single chance at successful mating. As an evolutionary strategy to ensure gene propagation, they engage in "plugging", in which the male breaks off its copulatory organ, securing it into the female, thus preventing future insemination by rivals.

== Behavior ==
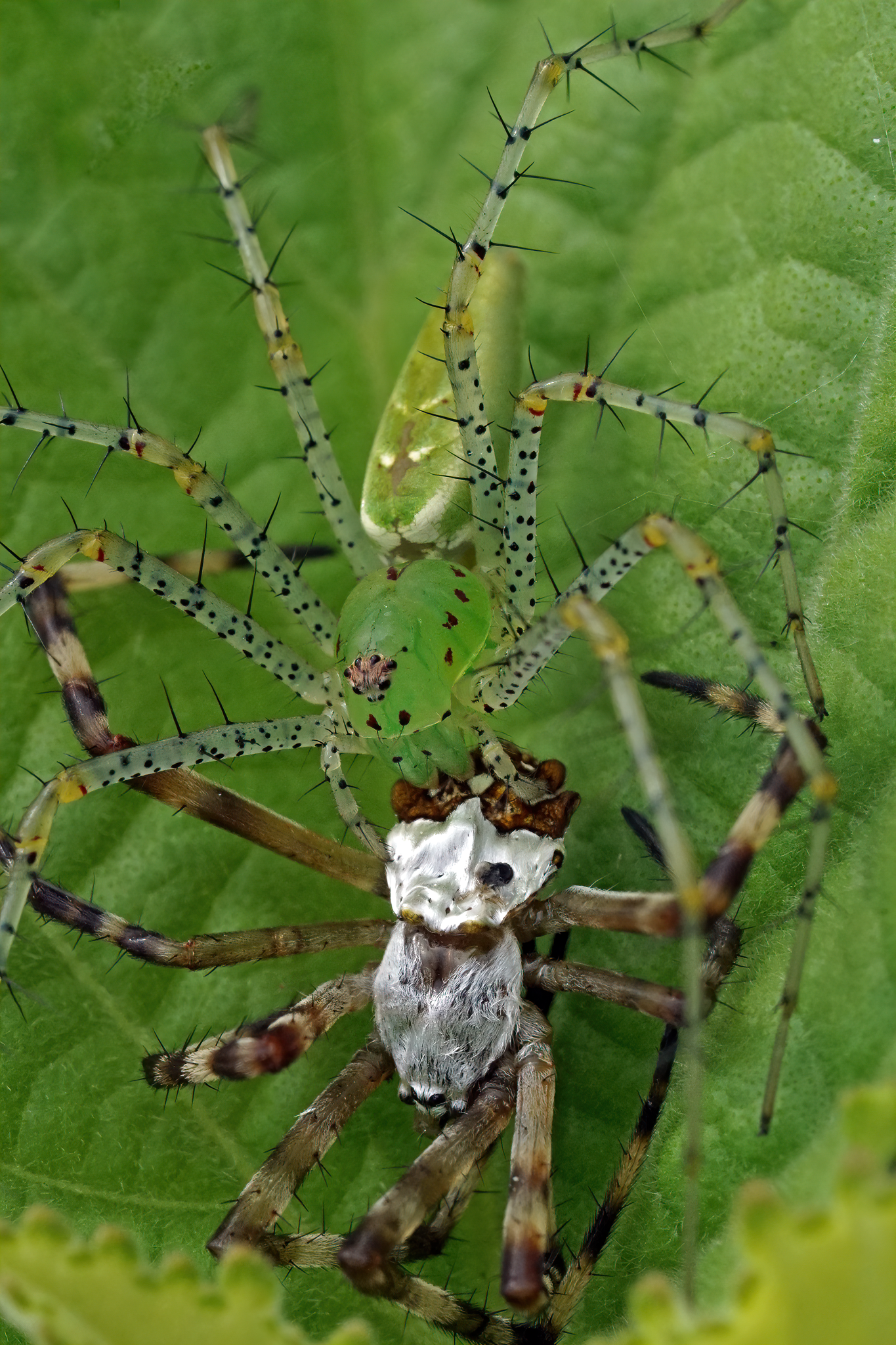
Being eaten by a green lynx spider

=== Grooming ===
Argiope argentata engages in grooming behavior post prey capture. The duration and intensity of this grooming behavior has a specific connection to the type of prey that was captured. The spider deliberately grooms the tarsal region on each of its eight legs, which is hypothesized to be due to the ability of these structures to respond to chemical changes using chemosensory organs. There is no evidence that A. argentata extends this grooming behavior to the rest of its body.

=== Defecating ===
The act of defecation occurs most frequently after biting the prey or feeding on it, and is a very calculated process. A. argentata consciously widens the space between its abdomen and its web before defecating, to ensure that the web itself is not soiled. A. argentata’s anus is positioned away from the web, so that the defecation itself will be excreted away from the web.

=== Drinking ===
Argiope argentata is found to receive its water supply from the web's surface. The web is able to capture and hold droplets of water for A. argentata to drink. It appears that this is the supplier of water for the spider, regardless of the presence and degree of other environmental conditions. For example, the spider is not reliant on the humidity of the air or the water content of the prey.

== Enemies ==
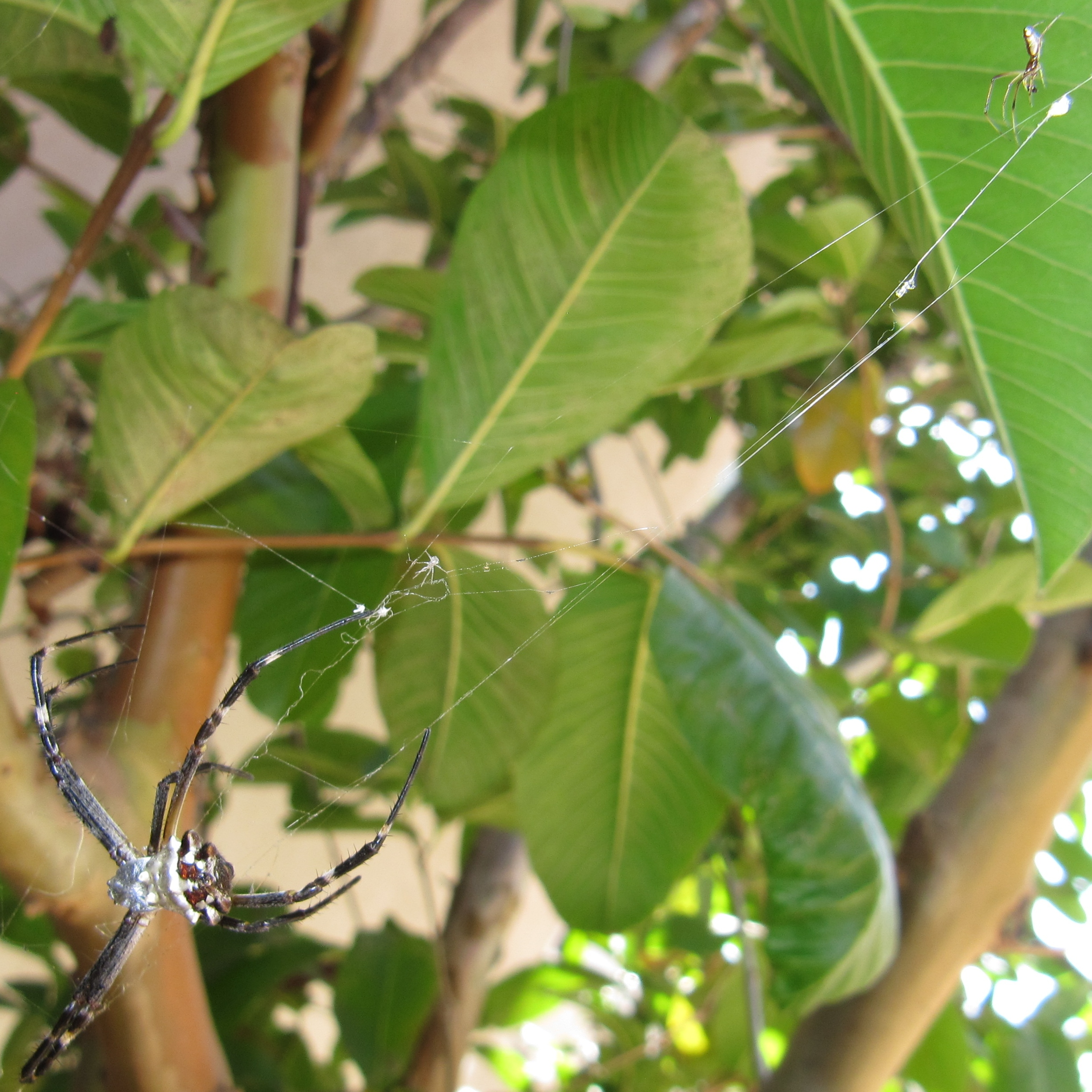
Female silver argiope (bottom-left), with dewdrop spider (top-right, also with silver abdomen) living in its web, in Southern California

=== Predators ===
Lizards are significant predators of A. argentata, as can be seen by the so-called "lizard effect". That is, within island habitats, there is a negative correlation between the number of lizard inhabitants and the number of A. argentata. Other predators include wasps and birds.

=== Parasites ===
As skilled web designers and catchers of prey, Argiope argentata are frequently the target of food theft by other species. Dewdrop spiders (genus Argyrodes) are small kleptoparasitic or commensal spiders that can often be found living in the webs of A. argentata, where they feed on insects trapped by their host's web. Due to silver argiopes' poor vision, these intruders are usually able to escape detection and consequences for their trespass and thievery.

== Conservation ==
Argiope argentata is not currently an endangered species. These spiders are relatively abundant across a variety of different habitats. Because Argiope argentata can be found across different countries, there are currently no unified efforts to promote the conservation of either the species or the land on which they reside. As has been relatively commonplace, conservation efforts for most natural habitats (including that of Argiope argentata) revolve around reducing greenhouse gas emissions, recycling, and reducing pollution. These efforts will not only sustain the habitats of spiders, but those of countless other species who might be harmed by human action. Argiope argentata are very important for the conservation of certain environments. According to information gathered from the St. Louis Zoo, these spiders help keep insect and pest numbers down as they consume thousands of pounds of them per year. This helps to preserve certain crops and plant life without the need of harmful pesticides.

== Extinction patterns ==
Argiope argentata lacks a strong relationship between population size and persistence rates, which results in its high likelihood of sudden extinction regardless of its current population size. The four month long developmental time for A. argentata spiderlings opens the species up to a higher risk of deviation or disturbance in its normal population size. One hypothesis provided for these rampant cycles of extinction and regeneration, is that this constant fluctuation in population size leads to an inevitable outcome possibly hitting zero.

== Human bites ==
Argiope argentata are relatively harmless to human beings. If thoroughly and intentionally provoked, these spiders might bite out of self defense. Their venom is not toxic to humans and rarely causes any sort of adverse reactions. In fact, the bites of Argiope argentata are relatively comparable to a bee sting - with only minor redness and occasional swelling resulting. Despite being relatively harmless to humans, the bites of A. argentata can prove deadly to smaller animals such as insects and rodents. They are effective ways for the spiders to kill their prey once they have been immobilized.

== Gallery ==
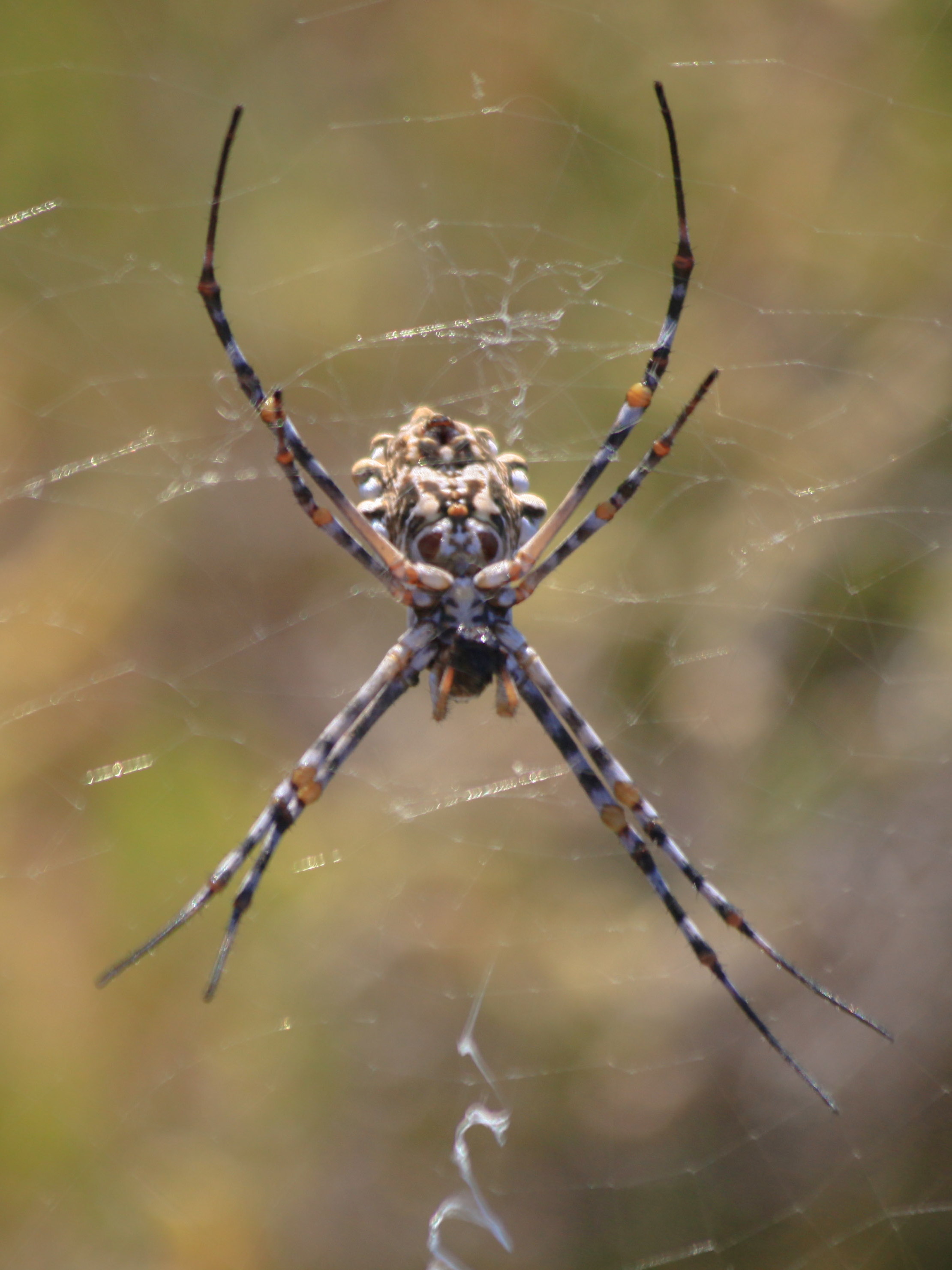
Argiope argentata - kerkennah - Tunisie

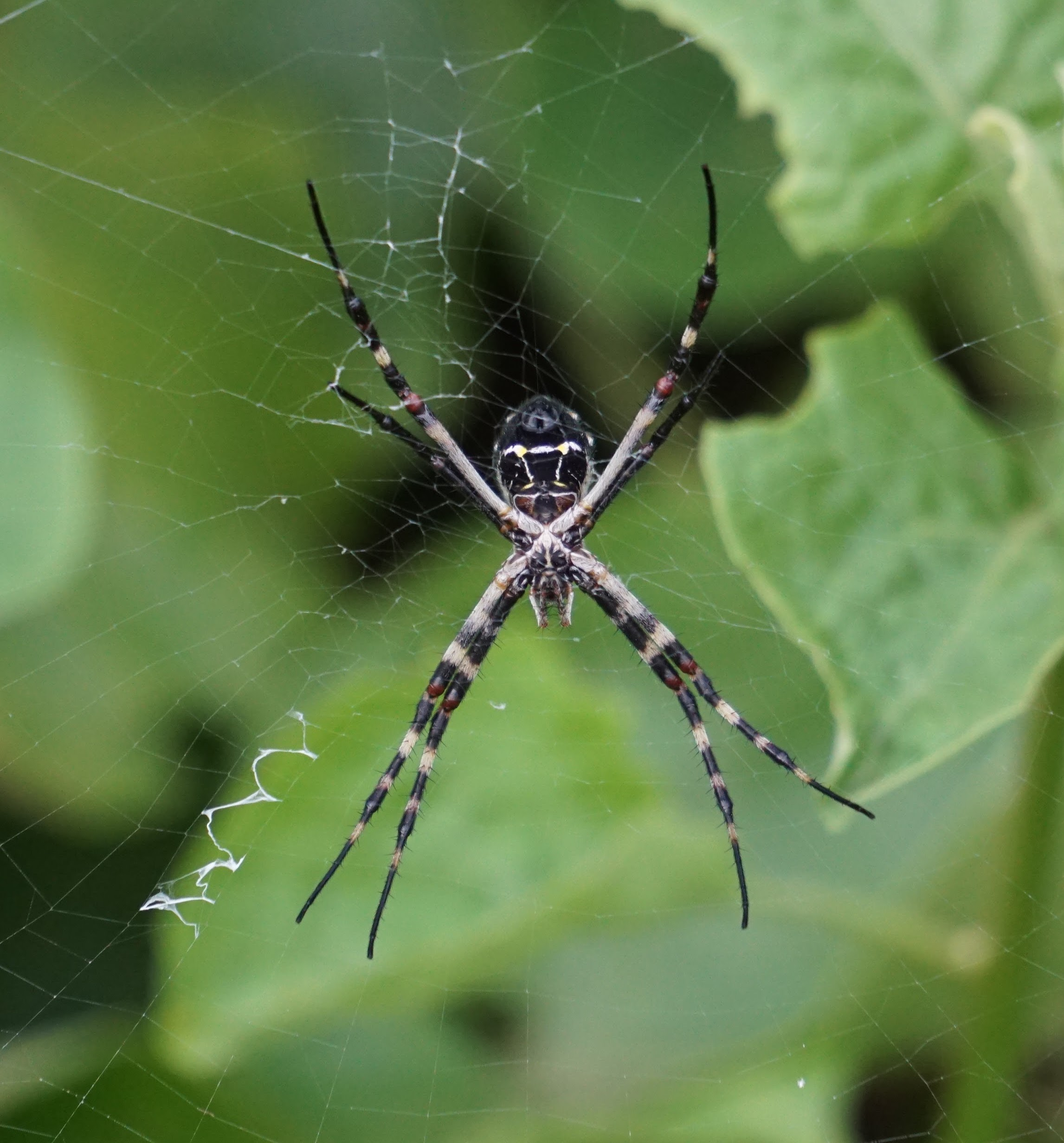
Female in the Galápagos Islands

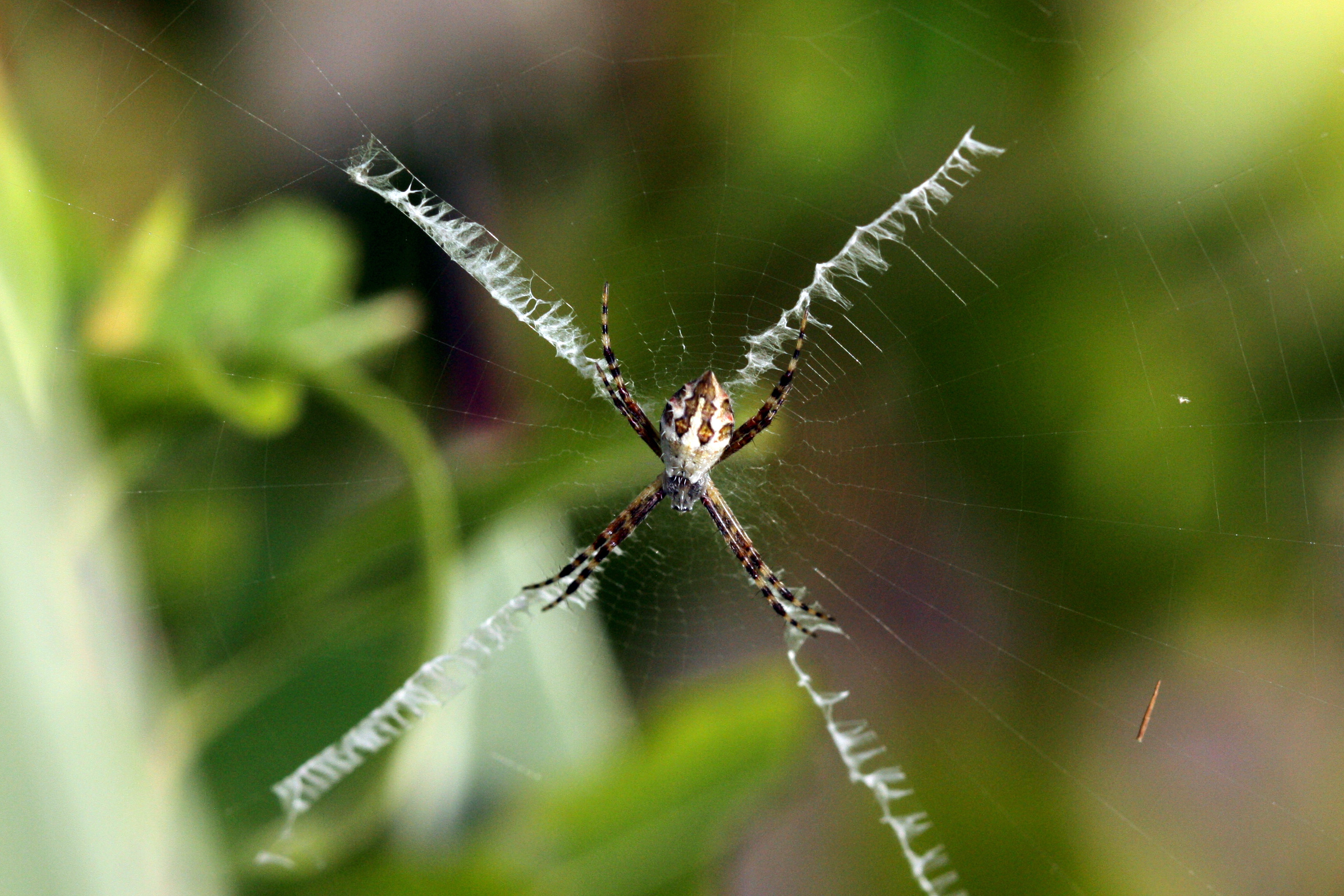
Female in Jamaica

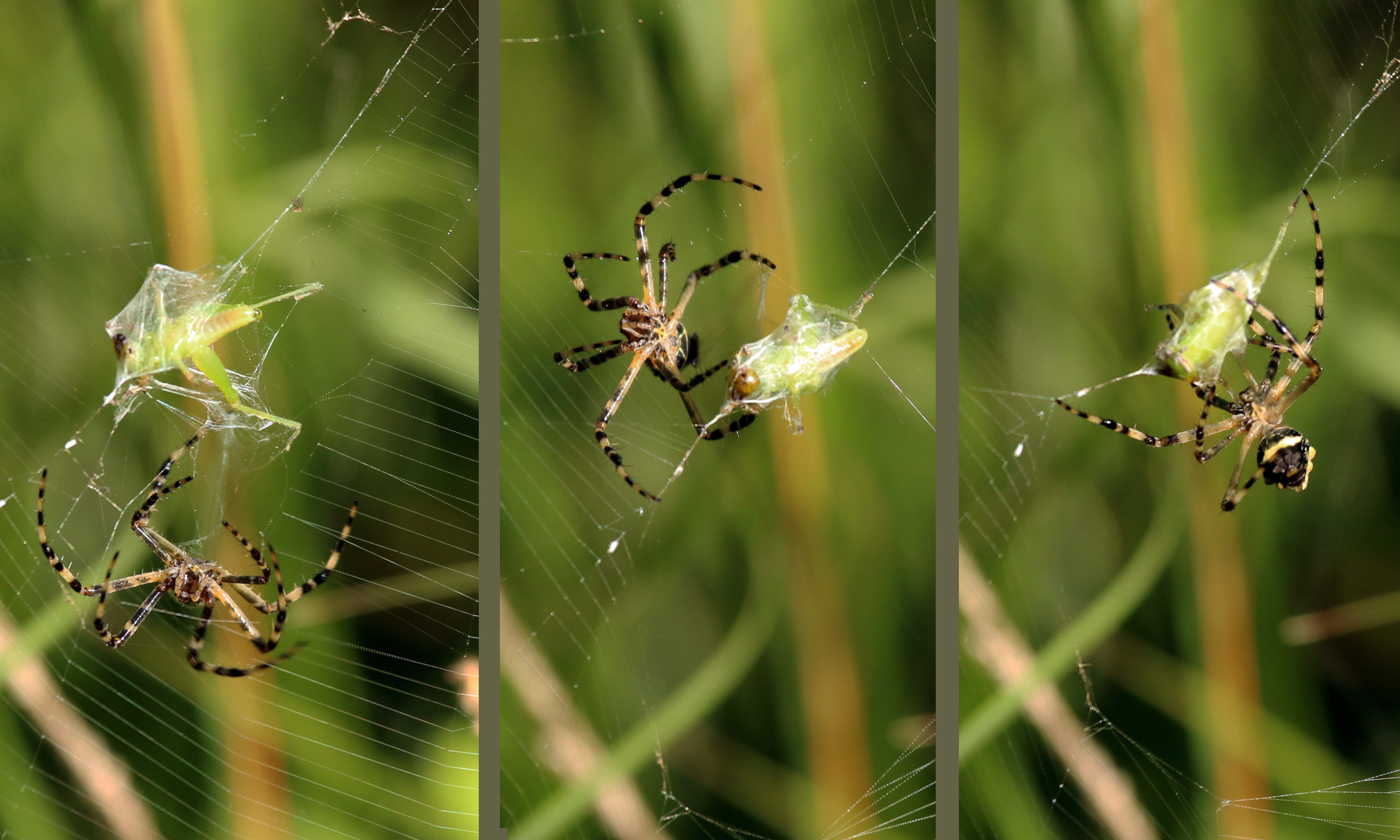
Female with victim (a bush cricket) in Jamaica

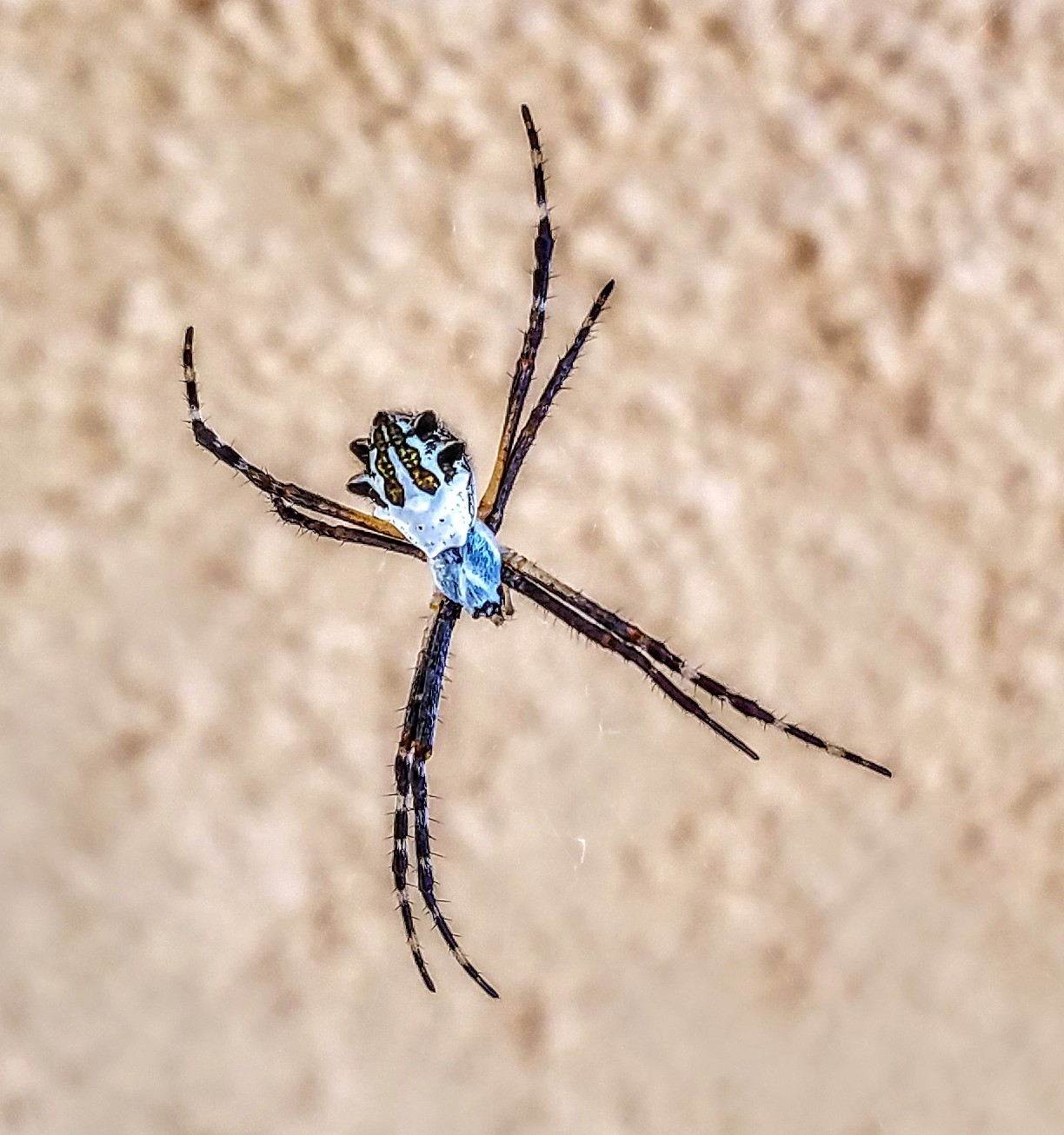
Female in Southern California
