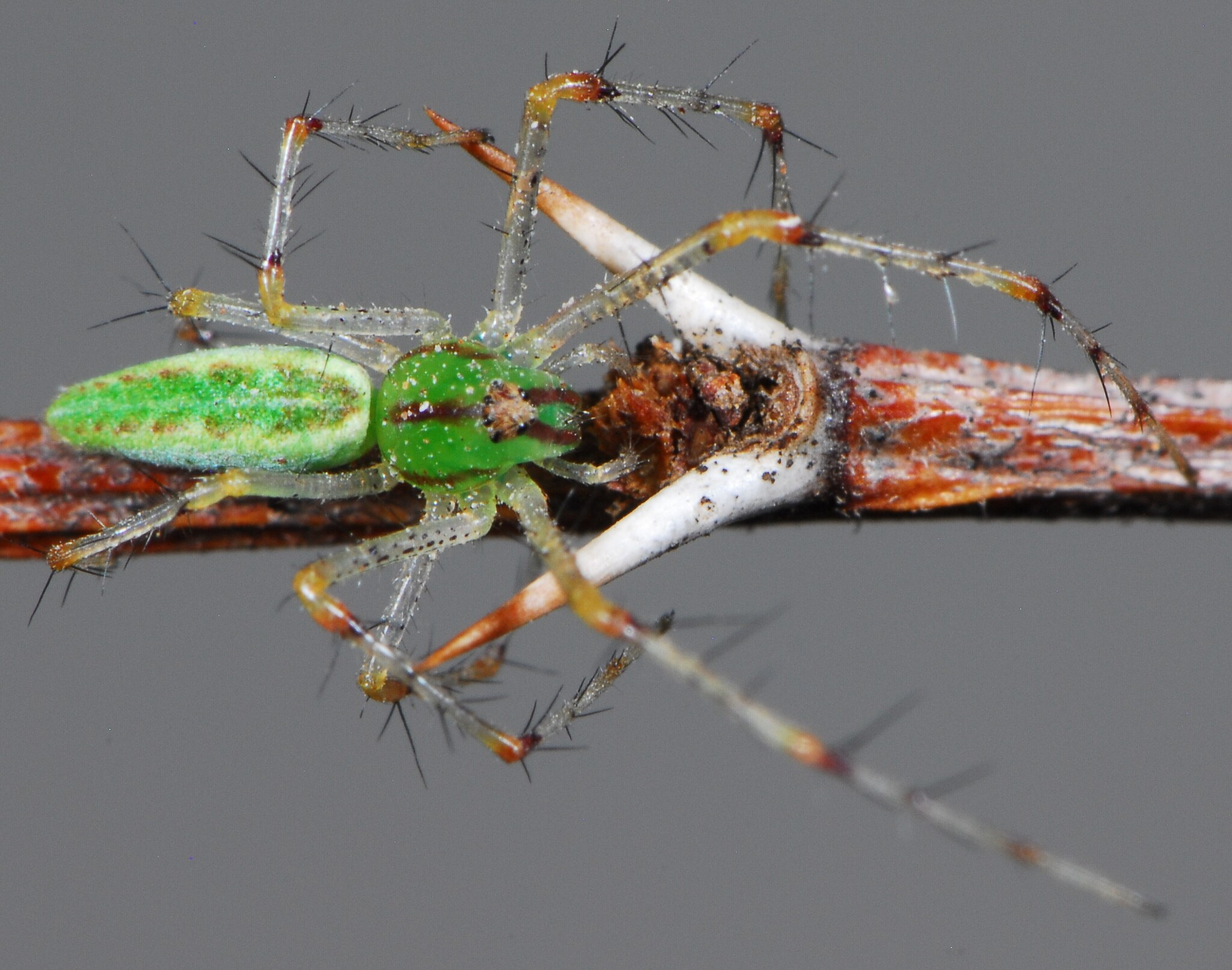
- juvenile female
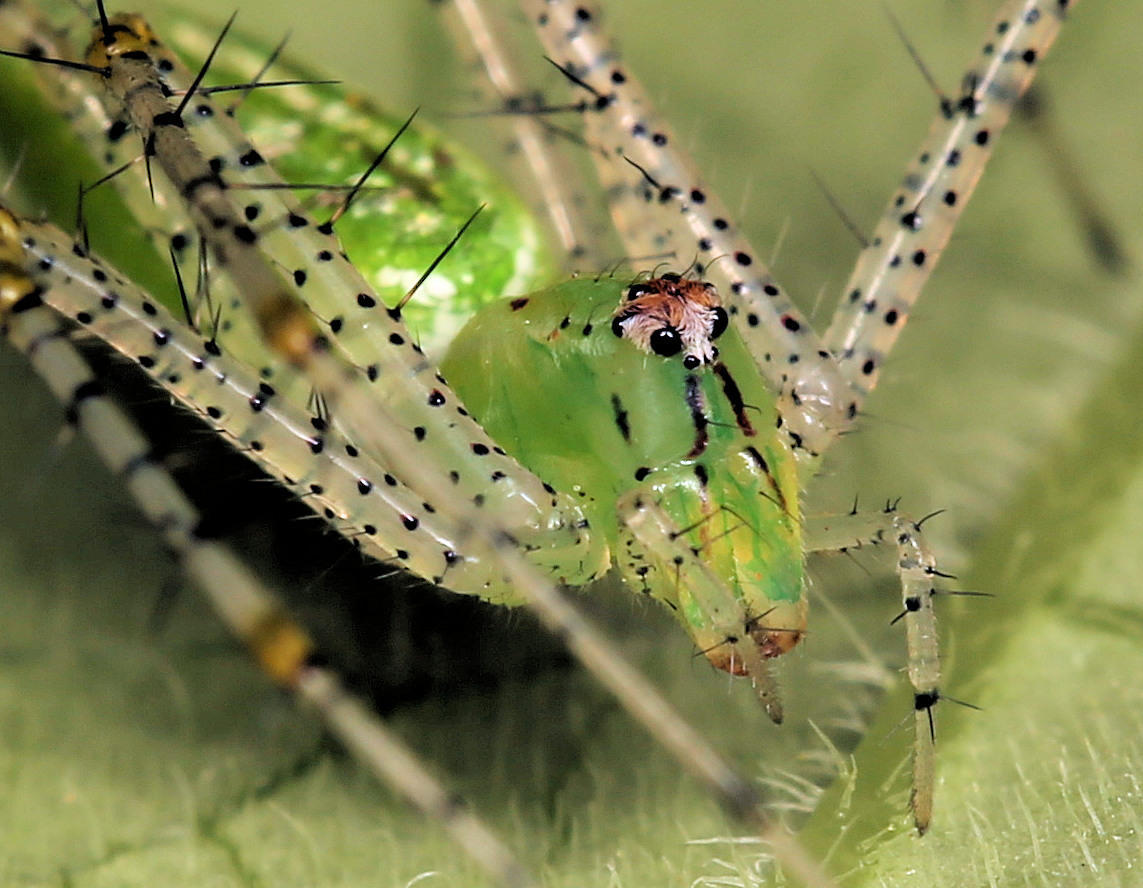

Scientific classification
- Kingdom: Animalia
- Phylum: Arthropoda
- Subphylum: Chelicerata
- Class: Arachnida
- Order: Araneae
- Infraorder: Araneomorphae
- Family: Oxyopidae
- Genus: Peucetia
- Species: P. viridis

Binomial name
- Peucetia viridis (Blackwall, 1858)

Synonyms
- Pasithea viridis Blackwall, 1858; Oxyopes littoralis Simon, 1866; Peucetia lampei Strand, 1906; Peucetia rubra Franganillo, 1926; Peucetia viridissima Franganillo, 1926

= Peucetia viridis =

African Green Lynx Spider

Species of spider

Peucetia viridis is a species of spider in the family Oxyopidae. It has a wide distribution across Africa, Europe, and the Middle East, and has been introduced to the Caribbean islands. It is commonly known as the African green lynx spider.

== Distribution ==
Peucetia viridis occurs across a vast range including Spain, Greece, the Canary Islands, Africa, and the Middle East, and has been introduced to Caribbean islands. In South Africa, the species is recorded from eight provinces across diverse habitats.

== Habitat and ecology ==
The species inhabits multiple biomes including Forest, Grassland, Nama Karoo, Savanna, Succulent Karoo, and Thicket biomes at altitudes ranging from 24 to 1,341 m above sea level.

Peucetia viridis is a free-living plant dweller that occurs on vegetation. The species has been collected from pistachio orchards and was recorded from the unpalatable Kalahari sour grass (Schmidtia kalahariensis) at Tswalu Game Reserve.

== Description ==
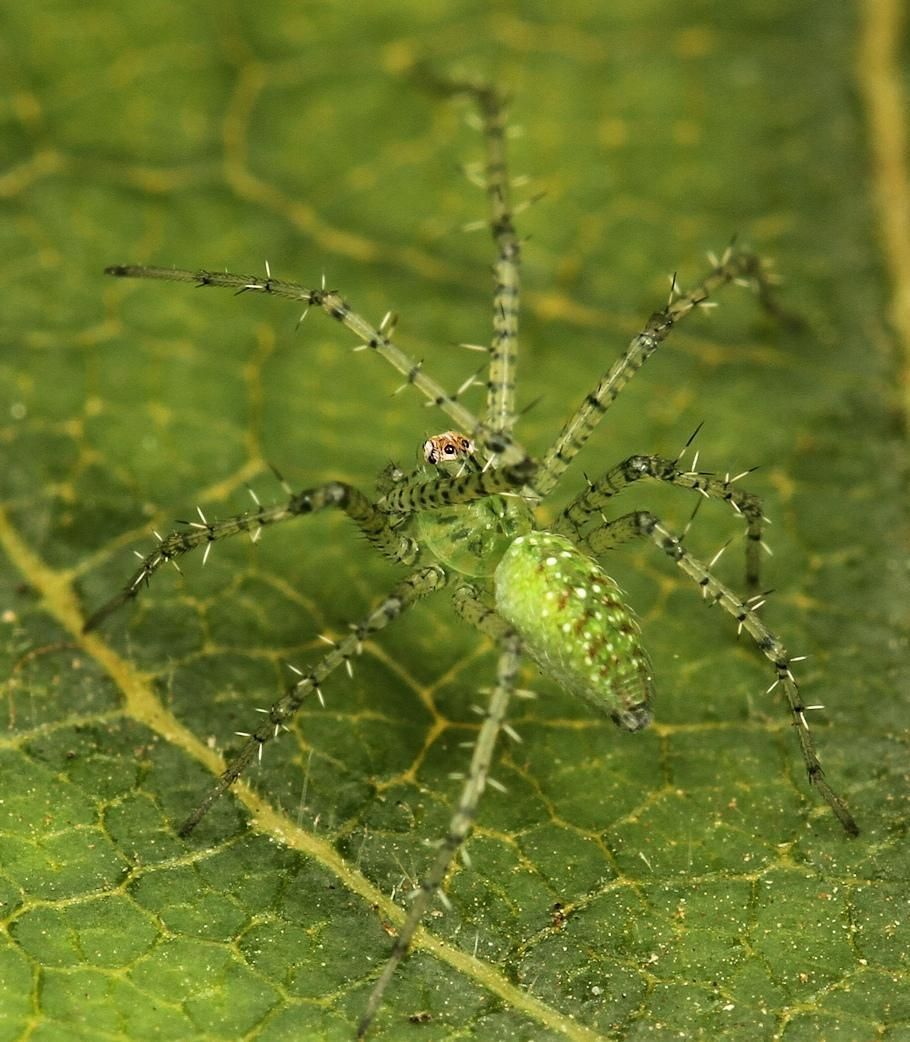

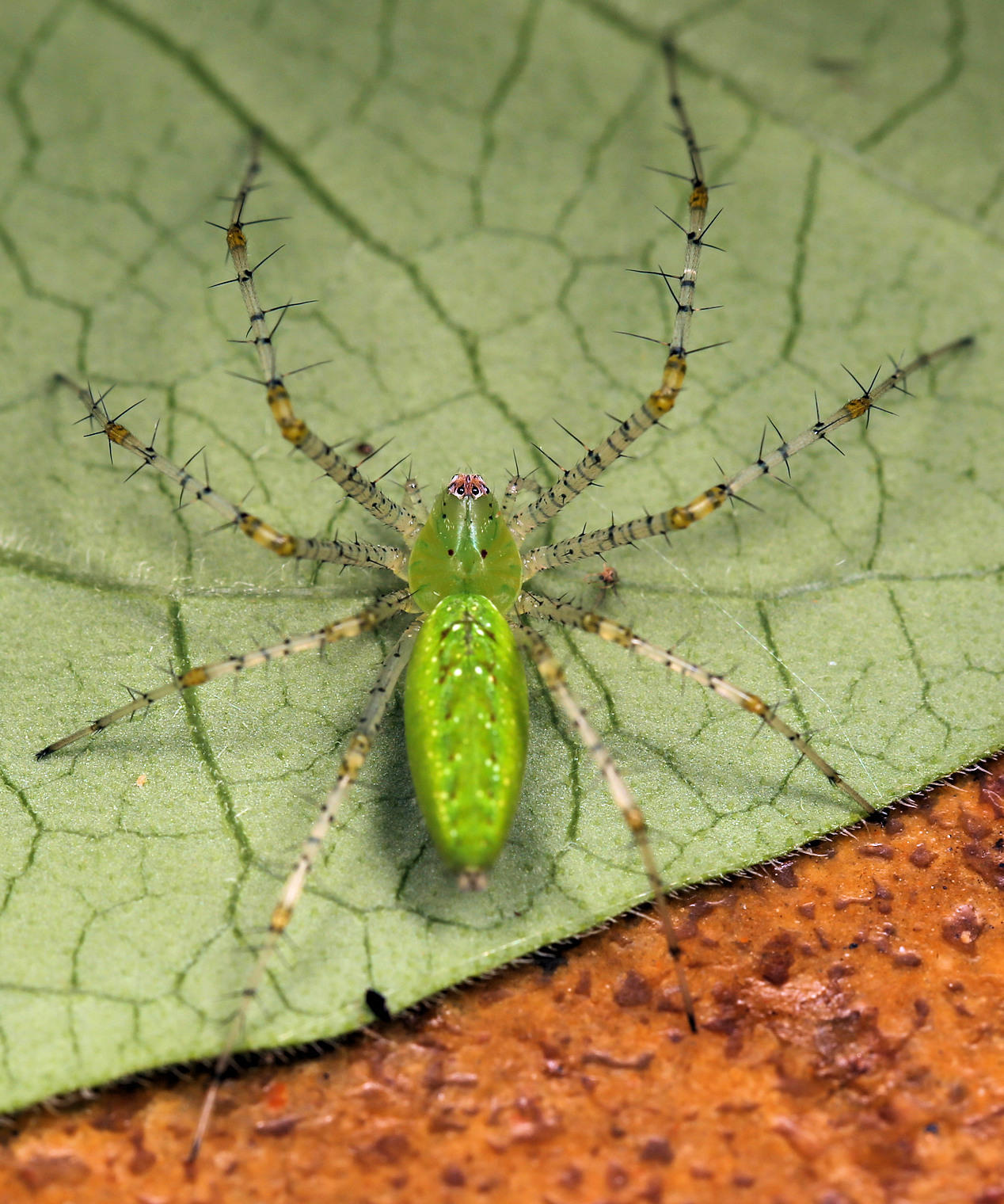

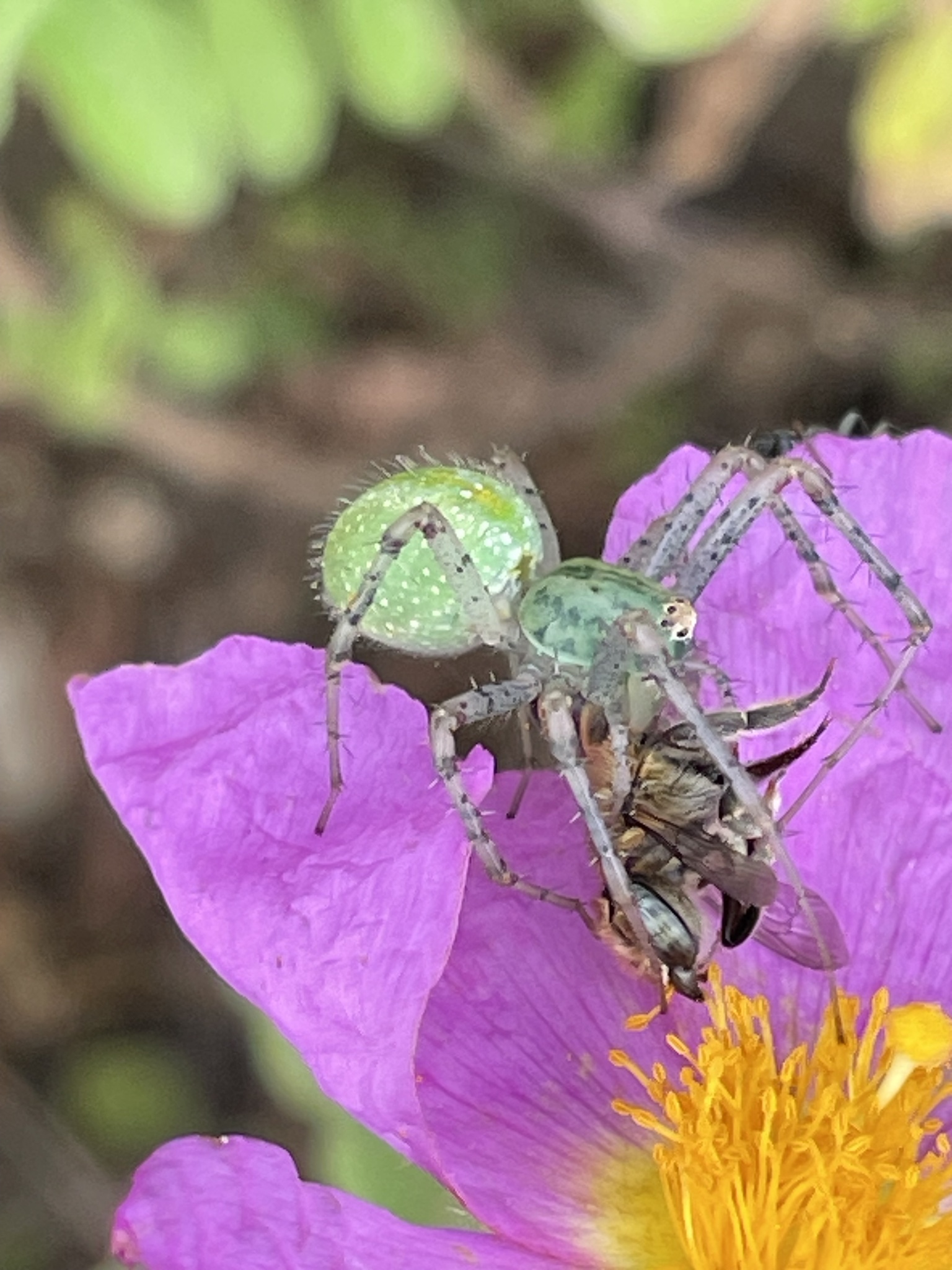

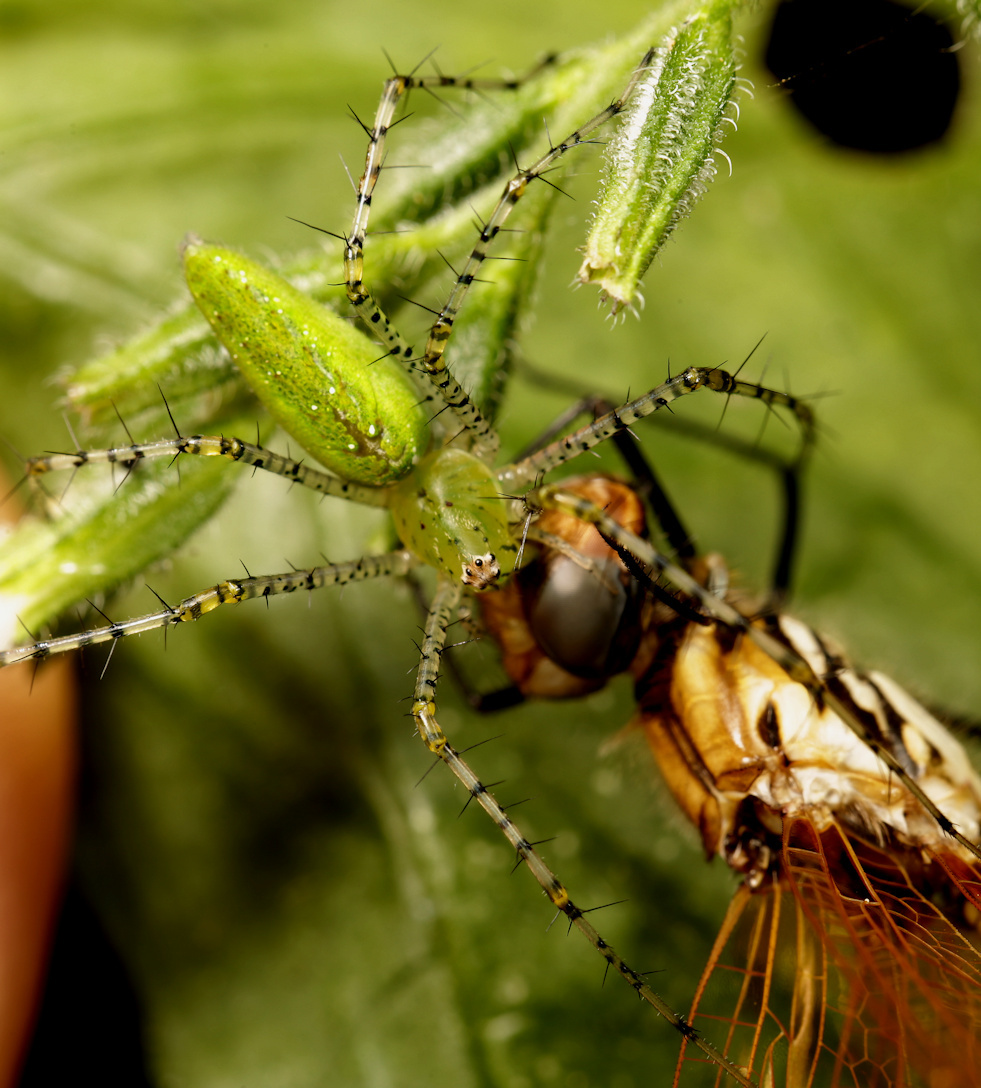

Peucetia viridis is known from both sexes. Like other green lynx spiders, it displays bright green coloration and has long, slender legs with prominent spines.

== Conservation ==
Peucetia viridis is listed as Least Concern by the South African National Biodiversity Institute due to its extremely wide geographic range across multiple continents. The species is protected in more than 10 protected areas in South Africa.

== Taxonomy ==
The species was originally described by John Blackwall in 1858 from Algeria under the name Pasithea viridis. A revision of the Afrotropical species of Peucetia was conducted by van Niekerk and Dippenaar-Schoeman in 1994.
