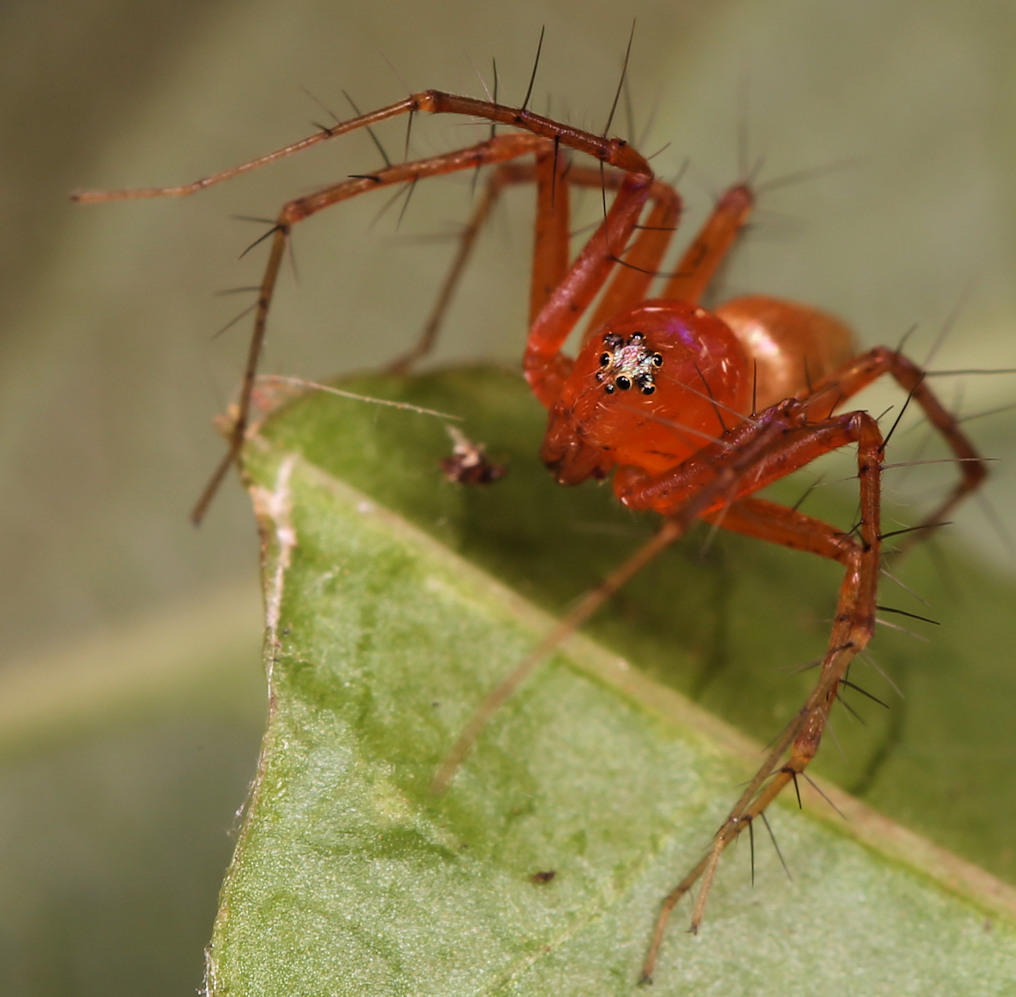
- female
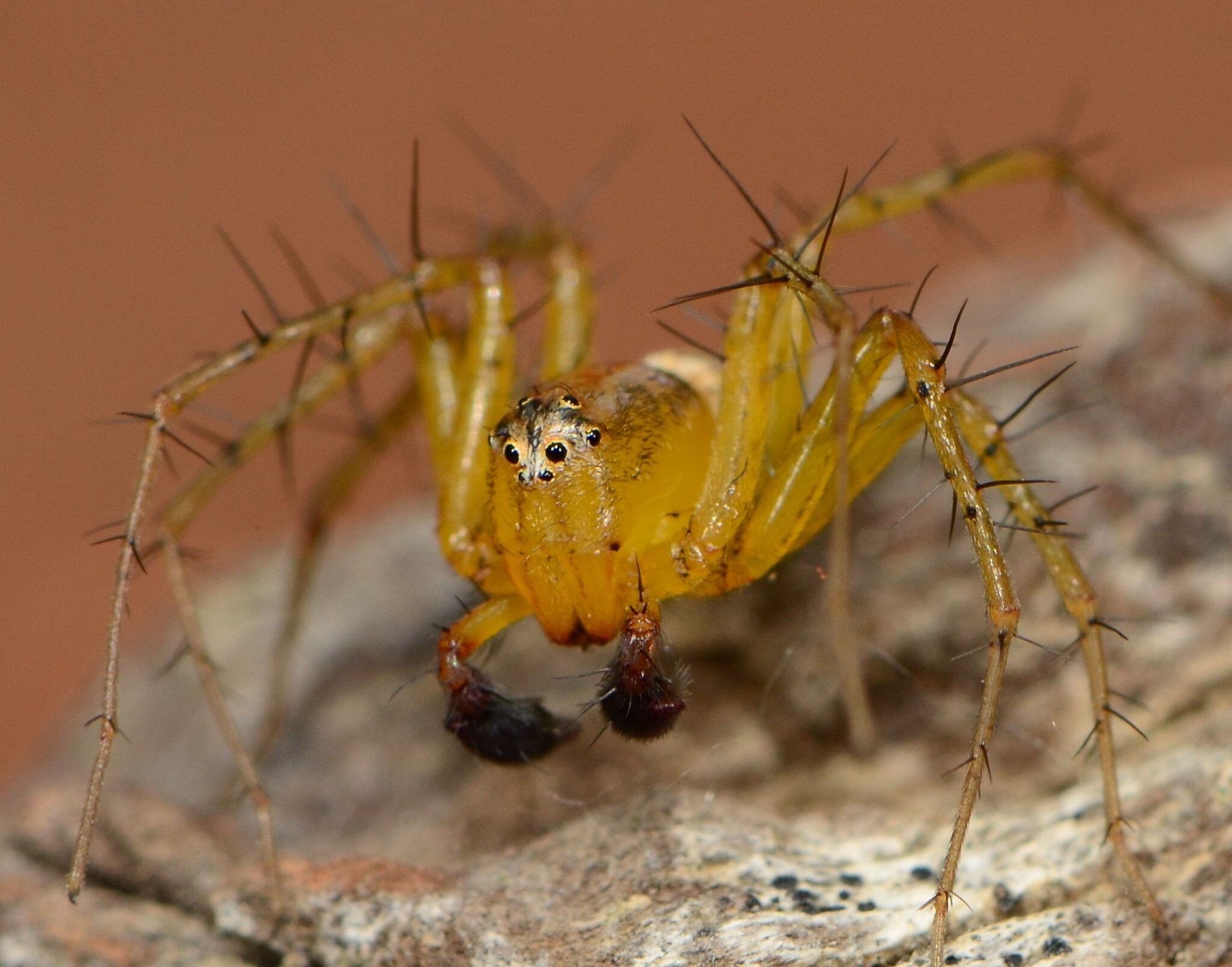
- male

Scientific classification
- Kingdom: Animalia
- Phylum: Arthropoda
- Subphylum: Chelicerata
- Class: Arachnida
- Order: Araneae
- Infraorder: Araneomorphae
- Family: Oxyopidae
- Genus: Oxyopes
- Species: O. vogelsangeri

Binomial name
- Oxyopes vogelsangeri Lessert, 1946

= Oxyopes vogelsangeri =

Long Palp Lynx Spider

Species of spider

Oxyopes vogelsangeri is a species of spider in the family Oxyopidae. It is commonly known as the long palp lynx spider.

== Distribution ==
Oxyopes vogelsangeri occurs in the Democratic Republic of the Congo and South Africa. In South Africa, the species has been recorded from seven provinces.

== Habitat and ecology ==
The species has been found on grasses across multiple biomes including Grassland, Nama Karoo, and Savanna biomes at altitudes ranging from 29 to 1,619 m above sea level.

== Description ==
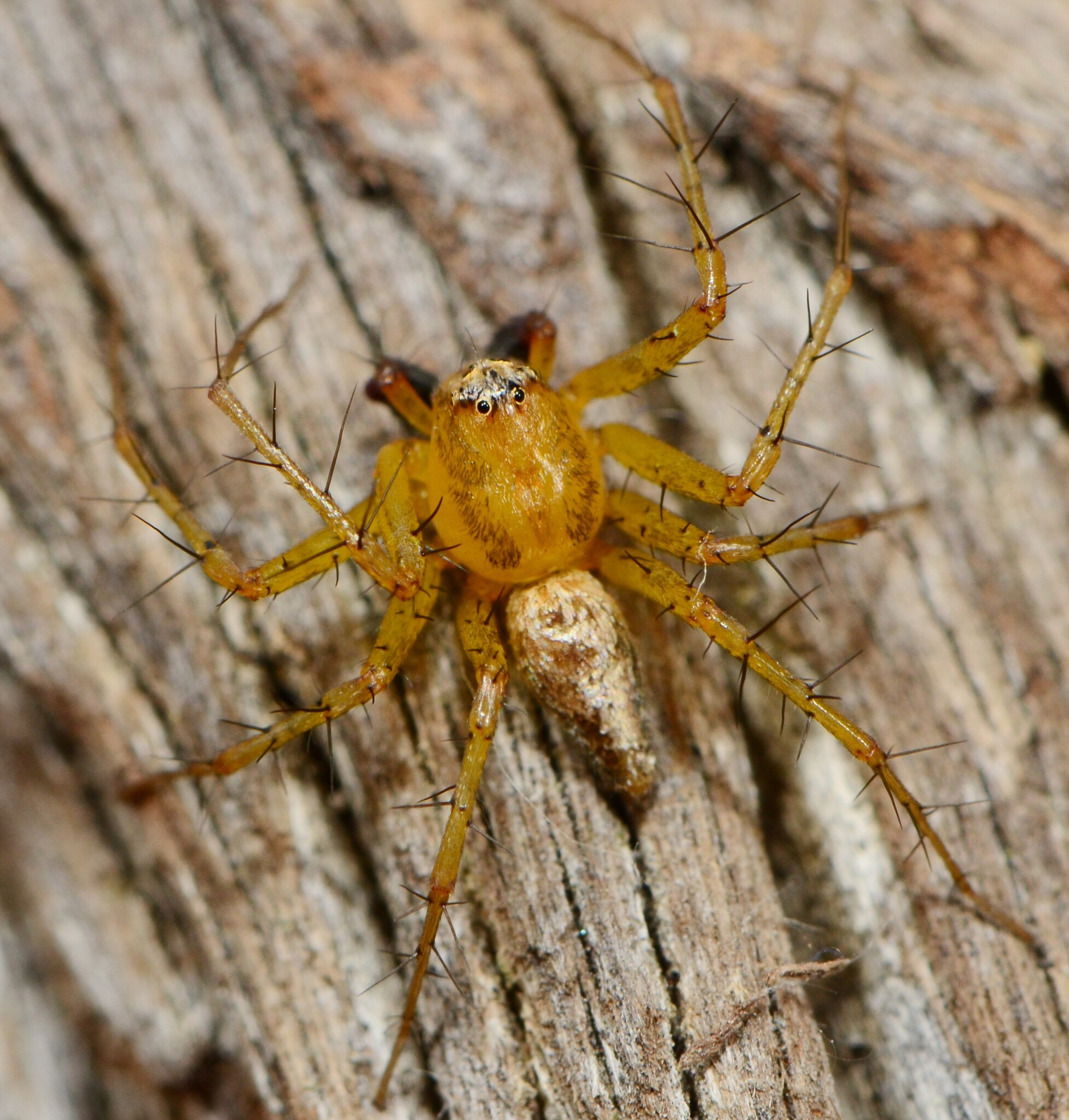
male

== Conservation ==
Oxyopes vogelsangeri is listed as Least Concern by the South African National Biodiversity Institute due to its wide geographic range across multiple African countries. The species is protected in several protected areas including Addo Elephant National Park, Pretoria National Botanical Garden, Kruger National Park, Swartberg Nature Reserve, and Tembe Elephant Park.
