= Zelotes uquathus =

Canton Dark Ground Spider

Conservation status
- Least Concern (SANBI Red List)

Scientific classification
- Kingdom: Animalia
- Phylum: Arthropoda
- Subphylum: Chelicerata
- Class: Arachnida
- Order: Araneae
- Infraorder: Araneomorphae
- Family: Gnaphosidae
- Genus: Zelotes
- Species: Z. uquathus

Binomial name
- Zelotes uquathus FitzPatrick, 2007

Species of spider

Zelotes uquathus is a species of spider in the family Gnaphosidae. It is commonly known as Canton dark ground spider and is endemic to South Africa.

== Distribution ==
Zelotes uquathus has a wide distribution in South Africa and is recorded from six provinces: KwaZulu-Natal, Limpopo, Free State, Mpumalanga, Northern Cape, and Western Cape.

== Habitat and ecology ==
The species has a wide altitudinal range, occurring from 26 to 2,040 m above sea level. They are free-running ground spiders found under stones during the day and inhabit the Fynbos, Grassland, and Savanna biomes.

== Conservation ==
Zelotes uquathus is listed as Least Concern by the South African National Biodiversity Institute due to its wide geographic range. The species is protected in Ndumu Game Reserve, Verloren Vallei Nature Reserve, and Rooipoort Nature Reserve. There are no significant threats to the species.

== Taxonomy ==
The species was described by FitzPatrick in 2007 from Canton, Rust 280, Limpopo. It is known from both sexes.
