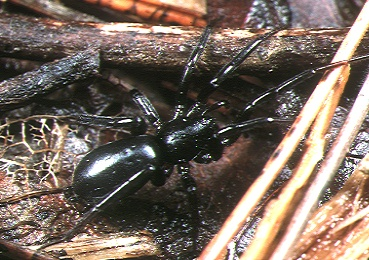
- Female Z. iriomotensis
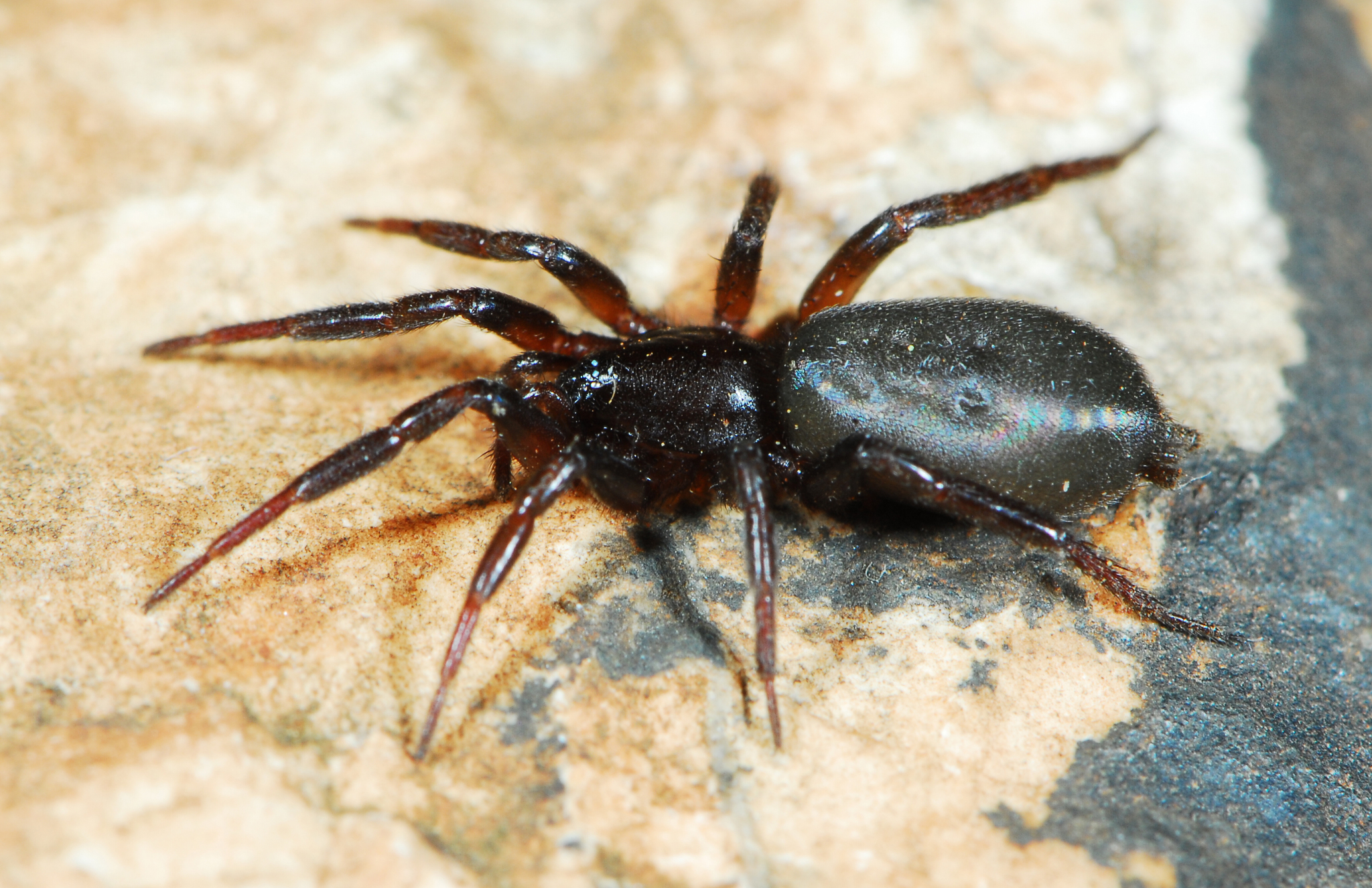
- Female Z. frenchi

Scientific classification
- Kingdom: Animalia
- Phylum: Arthropoda
- Subphylum: Chelicerata
- Class: Arachnida
- Order: Araneae
- Infraorder: Araneomorphae
- Family: Gnaphosidae
- Genus: Zelotes; Gistel, 1848

Type species
- Z. subterraneus (C. L. Koch, 1833)

Species
- > 400, see text

Synonyms
- Scotophinus Simon, 1905; Zavattarica Caporiacco, 1941

= Zelotes =

Genus of spiders

Zelotes is a genus of ground spiders that was first described by J. Gistel in 1848.

== Description ==
Zelotes are small to medium-sized spiders (5-10 mm) that are usually darkish in colour, ranging from dark reddish brown to almost black. The carapace is ovate and narrower in front, with a median fovea.

The anterior median eyes are circular and dark, while posterior median eyes are irregular and light. The abdomen is ovate, and legs are of medium length with leg formula IV, I, II, III. A distinctive pale patch is frequently present on the inside of femora I, and a preening comb is present on metatarsi III and/or IV.

== Species ==
As of September 2025, this genus includes 408 species.

These species have articles on Wikipedia:

- Zelotes aestus (Tucker, 1923) – Namibia, South Africa
- Zelotes albanicus (Hewitt, 1915) – South Africa
- Zelotes anthereus Chamberlin, 1936 – United States
- Zelotes aridus (Purcell, 1907) – Tanzania, Namibia, South Africa
- Zelotes bastardi (Simon, 1896) – DR Congo, Zimbabwe, South Africa, Madagascar
- Zelotes broomi (Purcell, 1907) – South Africa
- Zelotes caldarius (Purcell, 1907) – Botswana, South Africa
- Zelotes capensis FitzPatrick, 2007 – South Africa
- Zelotes capsula Tucker, 1923 – South Africa
- Zelotes captator (Thorell, 1887) – Myanmar
- Zelotes chinguli FitzPatrick, 2007 – Botswana, Zimbabwe, South Africa
- Zelotes corrugatus (Purcell, 1907) – Zambia, Namibia, Botswana, Zimbabwe, South Africa
- Zelotes doddieburni FitzPatrick, 2007 – Zimbabwe, South Africa
- Zelotes duplex Chamberlin, 1922 – Canada, United States
- Zelotes flavitarsis (Purcell, 1908) – South Africa
- Zelotes florisbad FitzPatrick, 2007 – South Africa
- Zelotes fratris Chamberlin, 1920 – Russia (Middle Siberia to Far East), Alaska, Canada, United States, Mexico
- Zelotes frenchi Tucker, 1923 – Botswana, Zimbabwe, South Africa
- Zelotes fuligineus (Purcell, 1907) – Ethiopia, DR Congo, Kenya, Tanzania, Namibia, South Africa, Lesotho
- Zelotes funestus (Keyserling, 1887) – United States
- Zelotes gooldi (Purcell, 1907) – Namibia, Botswana, South Africa
- Zelotes haplodrassoides (Denis, 1955) – Niger, Ethiopia, South Africa
- Zelotes hentzi Barrows, 1945 – Canada, United States
- Zelotes humilis (Purcell, 1907) – Zimbabwe, South Africa
- Zelotes invidus (Purcell, 1907) – Namibia, South Africa
- Zelotes kuncinyanus FitzPatrick, 2007 – South Africa
- Zelotes lasalanus Chamberlin, 1928 – Canada, United States, Mexico
- Zelotes lavus Tucker, 1923 – Namibia, Zimbabwe, South Africa
- Zelotes lightfooti (Purcell, 1907) – South Africa
- Zelotes lotzi FitzPatrick, 2007 – South Africa
- Zelotes mashonus FitzPatrick, 2007 – DR Congo, Botswana, Zimbabwe, South Africa
- Zelotes muizenbergensis FitzPatrick, 2007 – South Africa
- Zelotes namaquus FitzPatrick, 2007 – South Africa
- Zelotes namibensis FitzPatrick, 2007 – Namibia, South Africa
- Zelotes natalensis Tucker, 1923 – Mozambique, South Africa
- Zelotes ngomensis FitzPatrick, 2007 – South Africa
- Zelotes otavi FitzPatrick, 2007 – Namibia, Botswana, South Africa
- Zelotes ovambensis Lawrence, 1927 – Namibia, South Africa
- Zelotes pallidipes Tucker, 1923 – Namibia, South Africa
- Zelotes pseustes Chamberlin, 1922 – United States, Mexico
- Zelotes pulchripes (Purcell, 1908) – South Africa
- Zelotes puritanus Chamberlin, 1922 – Alaska, Canada, United States, Mexico, Europe, Turkey, Russia (Europe to Far East), Kazakhstan, Iran
- Zelotes qwabergensis FitzPatrick, 2007 – South Africa
- Zelotes radiatus Lawrence, 1928 – Namibia, Botswana, Zimbabwe, South Africa
- Zelotes reduncus (Purcell, 1907) – South Africa, Lesotho
- Zelotes resolution FitzPatrick, 2007 – South Africa
- Zelotes sclateri Tucker, 1923 – South Africa, Lesotho
- Zelotes scrutatus (O. Pickard-Cambridge, 1872) – Canary Islands, Italy (Sicily), Greece, Cyprus, Turkey, Africa to Central Asia
- Zelotes songus FitzPatrick, 2007 – South Africa
- Zelotes subterraneus (C. L. Koch, 1833) – Europe, Cyprus, Turkey, Caucasus, Russia (Europe to Far East), Kazakhstan, Central Asia, China (type species)
- Zelotes tenuis (L. Koch, 1866) – Mediterranean and Central Europe to Russia (Caucasus). Introduced to Galapagos Islands, United States
- Zelotes tuckeri Roewer, 1951 – Ethiopia, East Africa, Kenya, Namibia, Botswana, Zimbabwe, Mozambique, South Africa
- Zelotes uquathus FitzPatrick, 2007 – South Africa
- Zelotes zonognathus (Purcell, 1907) – Mali, Ivory Coast, DR Congo, Namibia, Zimbabwe, South Africa
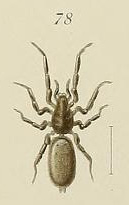
Z. asiatica

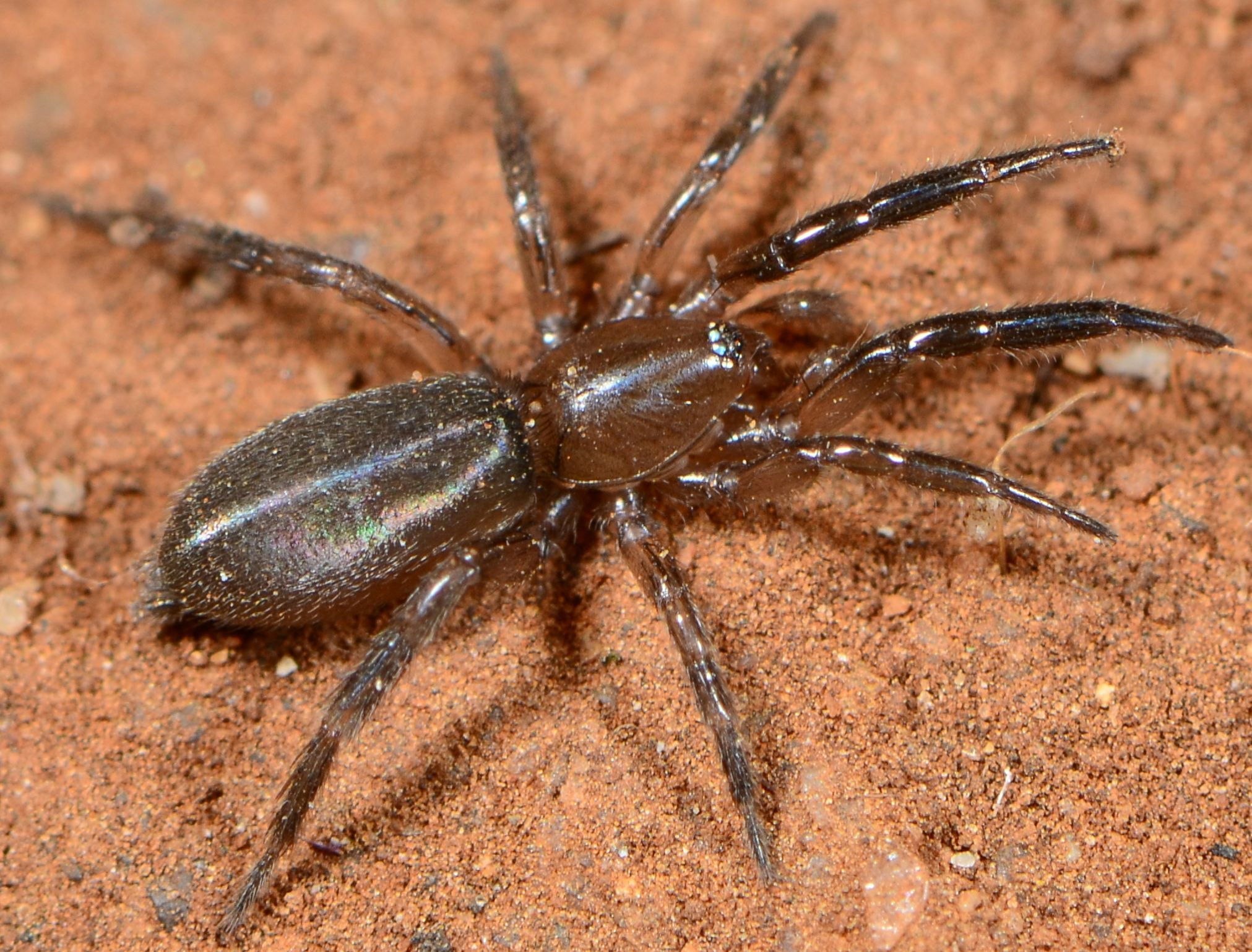
Z. frenchi

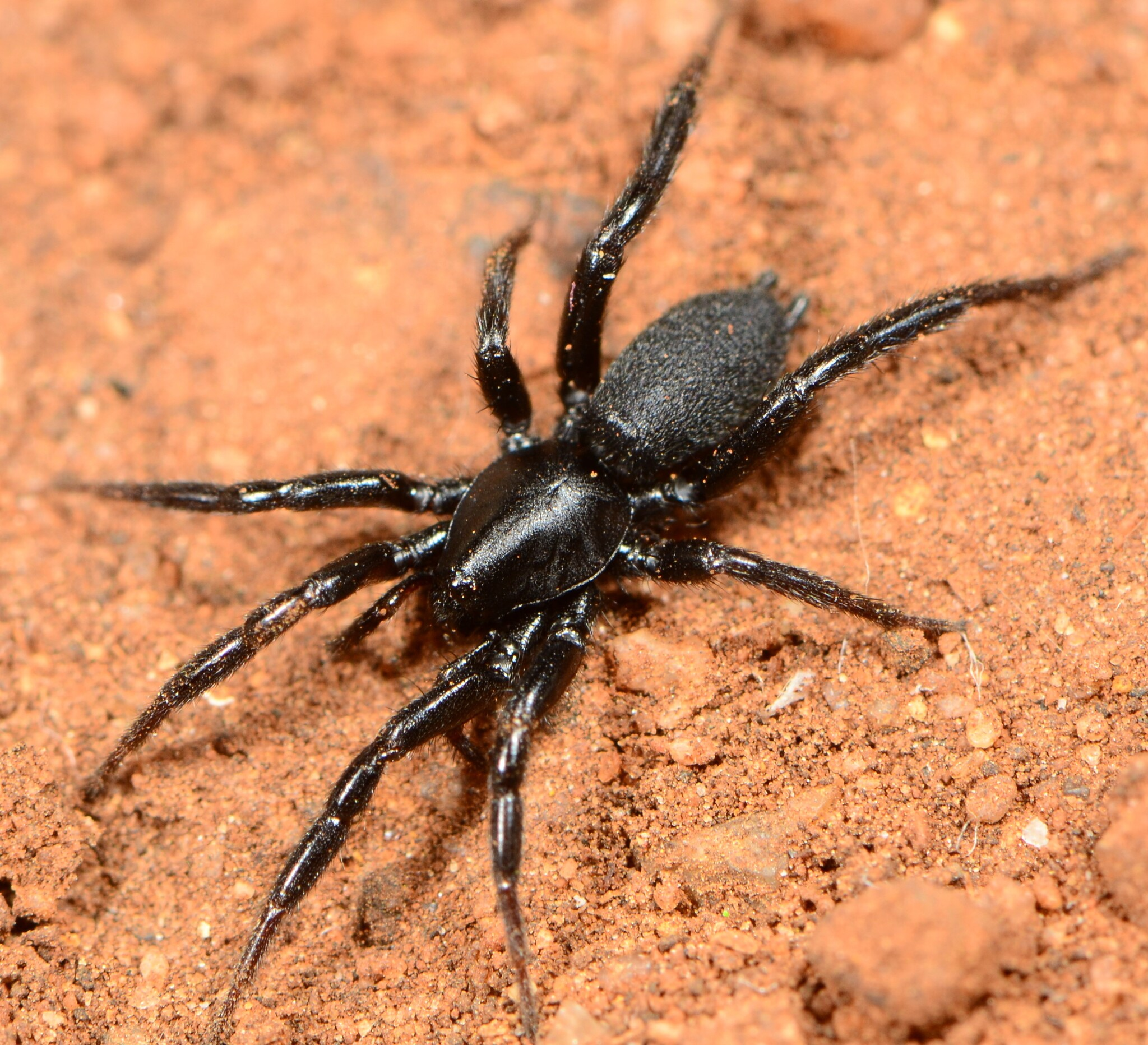
Z. fuligineus

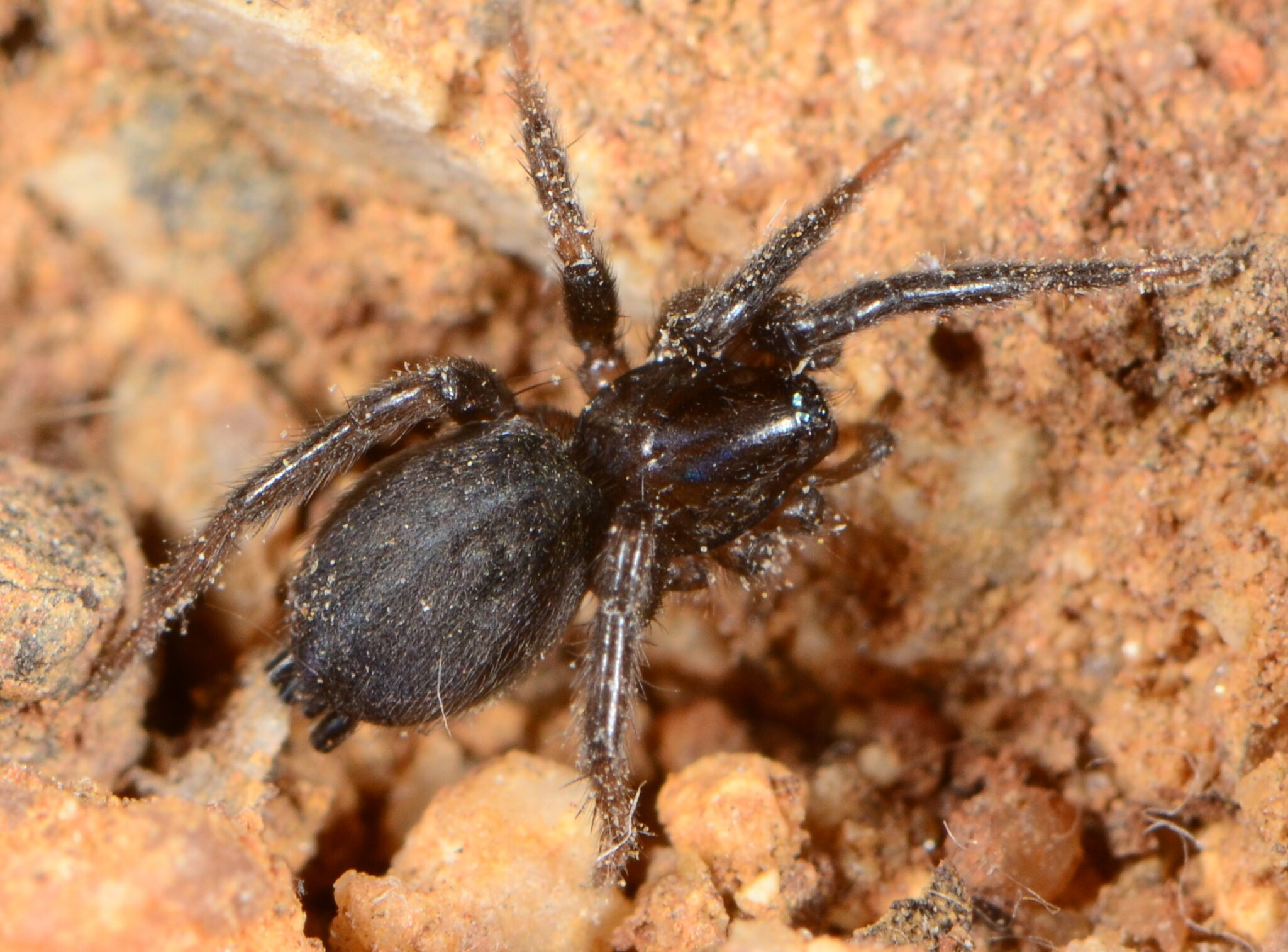
Z. humilis

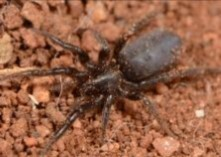
Z. lavus

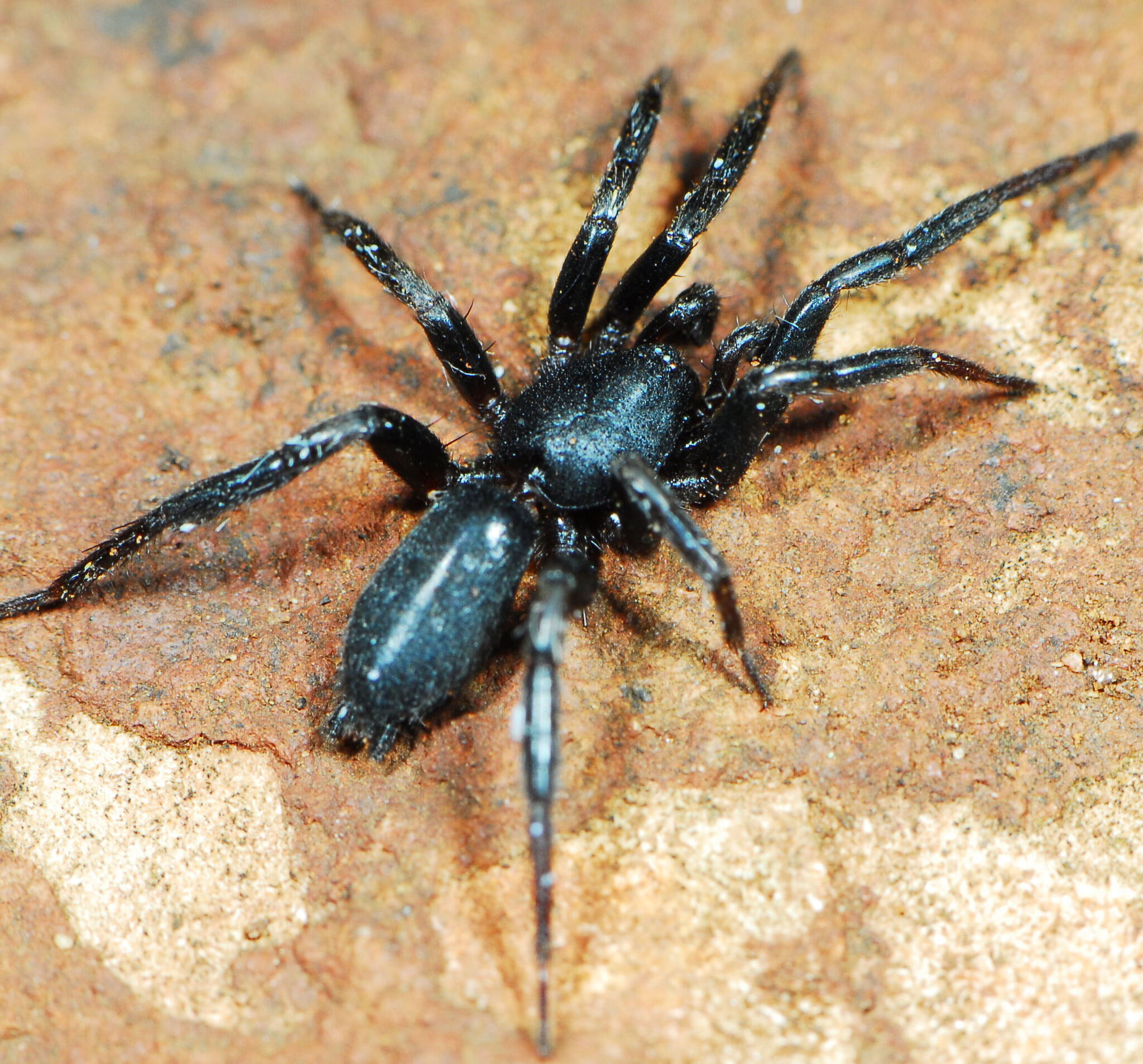
Z. natalensis

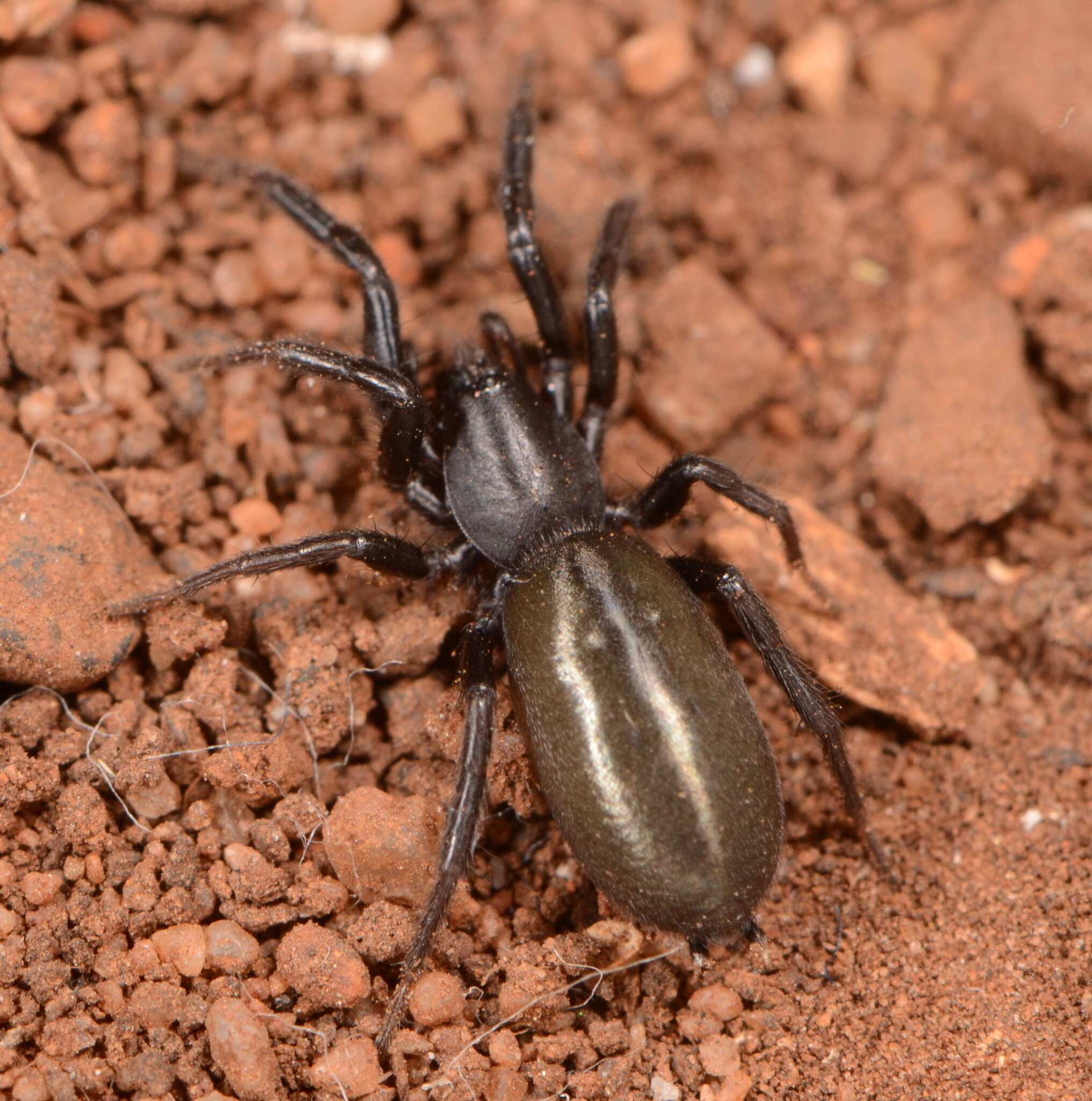
Z. pallidipes

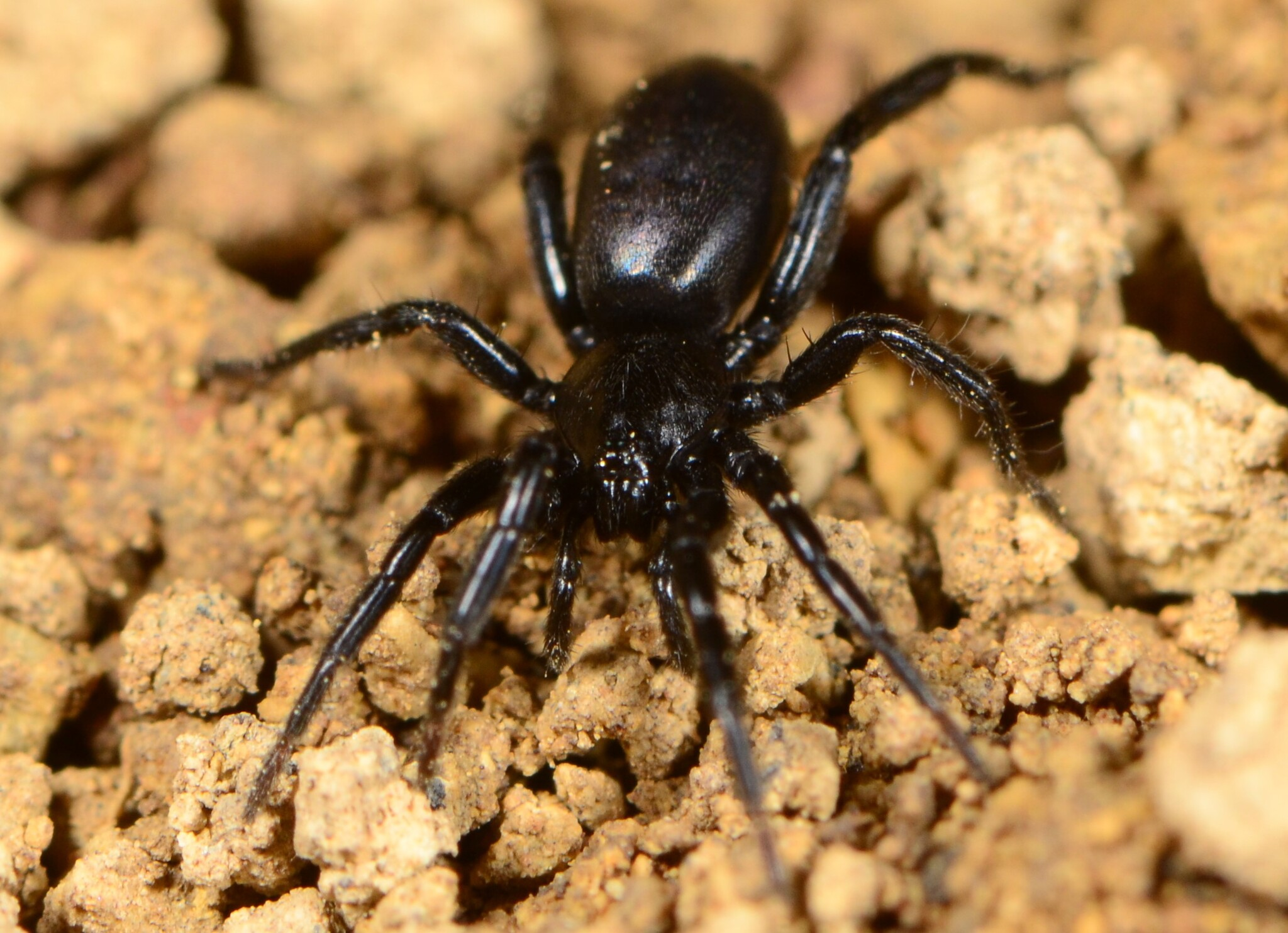
Z. qwabergensis

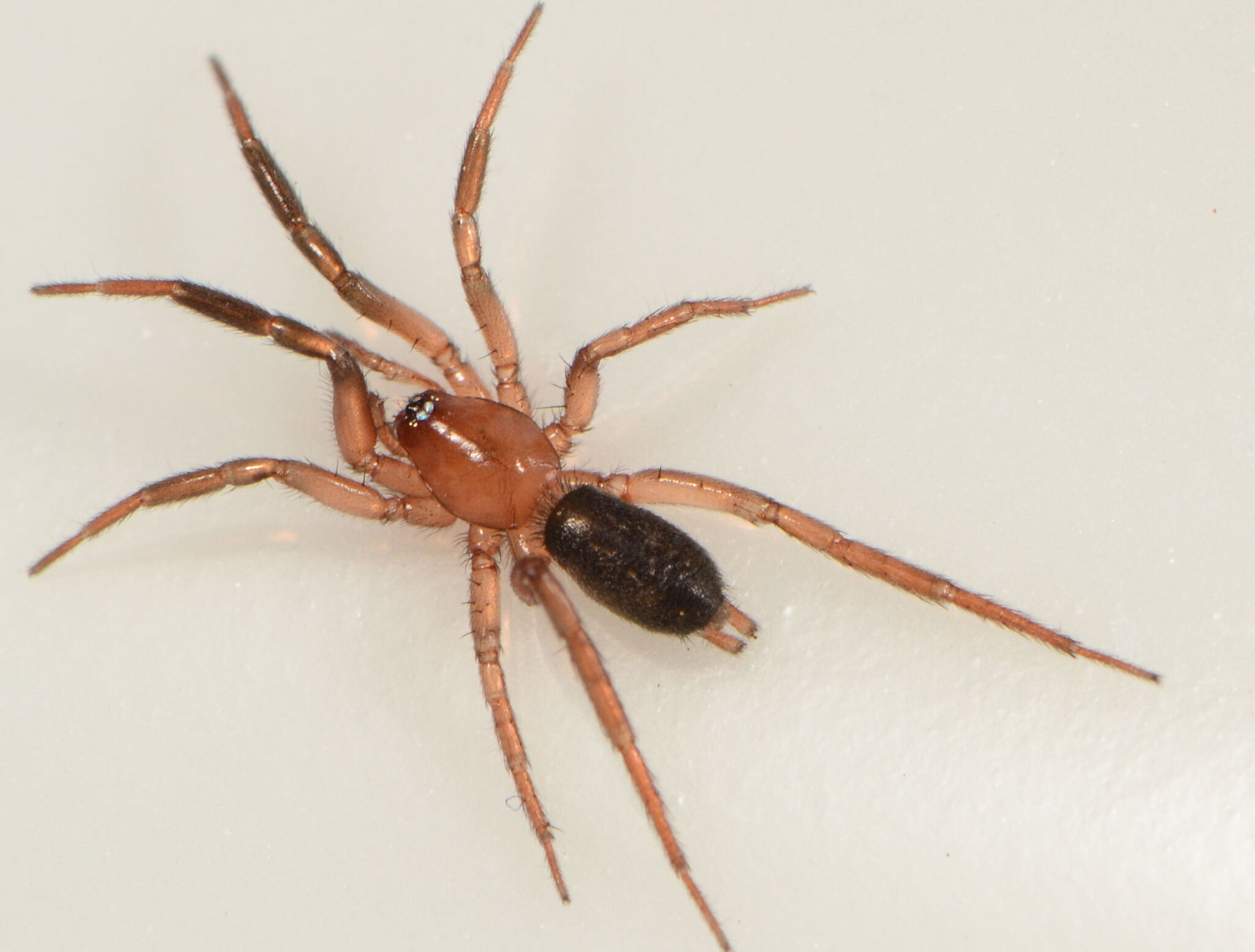
Z. reduncus

Complete species list as of September 2025
- Z. abdurakhmanovi Ponomarev, 2018 – Kazakhstan
- Z. acapulcoanus Gertsch & Davis, 1940 – Mexico
- Z. acarnanicus Lissner & Chatzaki, 2018 – Greece
- Z. adderet Levy, 2009 – Israel
- Z. aeneus (Simon, 1878) – Madeira, Europe, Turkey, Azerbaijan
- Z. aerosus Charitonov, 1946 – Greece (Crete), Uzbekistan, Turkmenistan
- Z. aestus (Tucker, 1923) – Namibia, South Africa
- Z. aiken Platnick & Shadab, 1983 – United States
- Z. albanicus (Hewitt, 1915) – South Africa
- Z. albomaculatus (O. Pickard-Cambridge, 1901) – South Africa
- Z. alpujarraensis Senglet, 2011 – Spain, Iran
- Z. altissimus Hu, 1989 – China
- Z. anatolyi Fomichev & Marusik, 2021 – Kazakhstan, Tajikistan
- Z. anchoralis Denis, 1958 – Afghanistan
- Z. andreinii Reimoser, 1937 – Ethiopia, Uganda
- Z. anglo Gertsch & Riechert, 1976 – United States, Mexico
- Z. angolensis FitzPatrick, 2007 – Angola
- Z. annamarieae Lissner, 2017 – Canary Islands
- Z. anthereus Chamberlin, 1936 – United States
- Z. apricorum (L. Koch, 1876) – Europe, Turkey, Kazakhstan, Iran
- Z. argoliensis (C. L. Koch, 1839) – Albania, Greece
- Z. aridus (Purcell, 1907) – Tanzania, Namibia, South Africa
- Z. arnoldii Charitonov, 1946 – Uzbekistan, Turkmenistan
- Z. ashae Tikader & Gajbe, 1976 – India
- Z. asiaticus (Bösenberg & Strand, 1906) – Russia (Far East), China, Korea, Japan
- Z. atlanticus (Simon, 1909) – Morocco
- Z. atrocaeruleus (Simon, 1878) – Europe, Turkey, Caucasus, Russia, (Europe), China
- Z. aurantiacus Miller, 1967 – Central, eastern Europe, Turkey, Caucasus (Russia)
- Z. azsheganovae Esyunin & Efimik, 1992 – Ukraine, Russia (Europe to South Siberia, Kamchatka), Kazakhstan
- Z. babunaensis (Drensky, 1929) – North Macedonia, Greece, Turkey, Iran
- Z. baeticoides Wunderlich, 2023 – Portugal
- Z. baeticus Senglet, 2011 – Spain
- Z. bajo Platnick & Shadab, 1983 – Mexico
- Z. balcanicus Deltshev, 2006 – Italy, North Macedonia, Bulgaria, Romania, Greece, Turkey, Israel
- Z. baltistanus Caporiacco, 1934 – Pakistan, Russia (South and north-eastern Siberia), Mongolia
- Z. baltoroi Caporiacco, 1934 – Pakistan, India
- Z. bambari FitzPatrick, 2007 – Central African Republic
- Z. banana FitzPatrick, 2007 – Congo
- Z. barbarella Wunderlich, 2022 – Portugal
- Z. barbarus (Simon, 1885) – Algeria, Tunisia
- Z. barkol Platnick & Song, 1986 – Russia (South Siberia), China
- Z. bashaneus Levy, 1998 – Israel
- Z. bassari FitzPatrick, 2007 – Togo
- Z. bastardi (Simon, 1896) – DR Congo, Zimbabwe, South Africa, Madagascar
- Z. beijianensis Hu & Wu, 1989 – China
- Z. berytensis (Simon, 1884) – Syria
- Z. bharatae Gajbe, 2005 – India
- Z. bicolor Hu & Wu, 1989 – China
- Z. bifukaensis Kamura, 2000 – Japan
- Z. bifurcutis Zhang, Zhu & Tso, 2009 – Taiwan
- Z. birmanicus (Simon, 1884) – Myanmar
- Z. bokerensis Levy, 1998 – Israel
- Z. boluensis Wunderlich, 2011 – Bulgaria, Turkey
- Z. bozbalus Roewer, 1961 – Afghanistan
- Z. brennanorum FitzPatrick, 2007 – Malawi, Zimbabwe
- Z. broomi (Purcell, 1907) – South Africa
- Z. butarensis FitzPatrick, 2007 – West Africa, Central Africa
- Z. butembo FitzPatrick, 2007 – Congo
- Z. calactinus Di Franco, 1989 – Italy (Sicily)
- Z. calcuttaensis (Biswas, 1984) – India
- Z. caldarius (Purcell, 1907) – Botswana, South Africa
- Z. callidus (Simon, 1878) – Portugal, Spain, France, Italy, Malta, Morocco, Algeria
- Z. cantonensis Platnick & Song, 1986 – China
- Z. capensis FitzPatrick, 2007 – South Africa
- Z. capiliae Barrion & Litsinger, 1995 – Philippines
- Z. caprearum (Pavesi, 1875) – Italy
- Z. caprivi FitzPatrick, 2007 – Namibia
- Z. capsula Tucker, 1923 – South Africa
- Z. captator (Thorell, 1887) – Myanmar
- Z. caracasanus (Simon, 1893) – Venezuela
- Z. caspius Ponomarev & Tsvetkov, 2006 – Kazakhstan
- Z. cassinensis FitzPatrick, 2007 – Guinea-Bissau
- Z. catholicus Chamberlin, 1924 – Mexico
- Z. cayucos Platnick & Shadab, 1983 – United States
- Z. chandosiensis Tikader & Gajbe, 1976 – India
- Z. chaniaensis Senglet, 2011 – Greece (Crete), Iran?
- Z. chinguli FitzPatrick, 2007 – Botswana, Zimbabwe, South Africa
- Z. chotorus Roewer, 1961 – Afghanistan
- Z. choubeyi Tikader & Gajbe, 1979 – India
- Z. cingarus (O. Pickard-Cambridge, 1874) – Albania, North Macedonia, Bulgaria, Greece, Turkey, Tajikistan
- Z. clivicola (L. Koch, 1870) – Europe, Turkey, Russia (Europe to South Siberia), Kazakhstan
- Z. coeruleus (Holmberg, 1876) – Argentina
- Z. comparilis (Simon, 1886) – Senegal, Burkina Faso
- Z. cordiger (L. Koch, 1875) – Ethiopia
- Z. cordubensis Senglet, 2011 – Spain
- Z. cornipalpus Melic, Silva & Barrientos, 2016 – Portugal, Spain
- Z. corrugatus (Purcell, 1907) – Zambia, Namibia, Botswana, Zimbabwe, South Africa
- Z. creticus (Kulczyński, 1903) – Greece (Crete)
- Z. criniger Denis, 1937 – Portugal, Spain, Italy, Algeria
- Z. cruz Platnick & Shadab, 1983 – United States
- Z. cyanescens Simon, 1914 – Spain, France
- Z. dagestanus Ponomarev, 2019 – Caucasus (Russia, Azerbaijan)
- Z. davidi (Simon, 1884) – Libya, Syria
- Z. davidi Schenkel, 1963 – China, Korea, Japan
- Z. desioi Caporiacco, 1934 – India
- Z. devotus Grimm, 1982 – Alps (Switzerland, Austria, Italy)
- Z. dingnan Liu, 2022 – China
- Z. discens Chamberlin, 1922 – United States
- Z. distinctissimus Caporiacco, 1929 – Greece
- Z. doddieburni FitzPatrick, 2007 – Zimbabwe, South Africa
- Z. donan Kamura, 1999 – Japan (Ryukyu Islands)
- Z. donnanae FitzPatrick, 2007 – Congo
- Z. duplex Chamberlin, 1922 – Canada, United States
- Z. egregioides Senglet, 2011 – Portugal, Spain, France, Italy (Sicily)
- Z. egregius Simon, 1914 – Spain, Andorra, France, Italy, Caucasus (Russia, Azerbaijan)
- Z. electus (C. L. Koch, 1839) – Europe, Turkey, Caucasus, Russia (Europe to South Siberia), Kazakhstan, Iran, Turkmenistan
- Z. erebeus (Thorell, 1871) – Europe, Turkey
- Z. eremus Levy, 1998 – Israel
- Z. ernsti (Simon, 1893) – Venezuela
- Z. erythrocephalus (Lucas, 1846) – Spain, Morocco, Algeria
- Z. eskovi Zhang & Song, 2001 – China, Korea
- Z. eugenei Kovblyuk, 2009 – Bulgaria, Greece, Ukraine, Russia (Europe, Caucasus)
- Z. exiguoides Platnick & Shadab, 1983 – Canada, United States
- Z. exiguus (Müller & Schenkel, 1895) – Europe, Russia (Europe to Far East), China, Korea, Japan, Turkey?
- Z. fagei Denis, 1955 – Niger, Egypt, Iraq
- Z. faisalabadensis Butt & Beg, 2004 – Pakistan
- Z. femellus (L. Koch, 1866) – Southern Europe
- Z. flabellis Zhang, Zhu & Tso, 2009 – Taiwan
- Z. flagellans (L. Koch, 1882) – Portugal, Spain
- Z. flavens (L. Koch, 1873) – Australia (Western Australia)
- Z. flavimanus (C. L. Koch, 1839) – Greece
- Z. flavitarsis (Purcell, 1908) – South Africa
- Z. florisbad FitzPatrick, 2007 – South Africa
- Z. florodes Platnick & Shadab, 1983 – United States
- Z. foresta Platnick & Shadab, 1983 – United States
- Z. fratris Chamberlin, 1920 – Russia (Middle Siberia to Far East), Alaska, Canada, United States, Mexico
- Z. frenchi Tucker, 1923 – Botswana, Zimbabwe, South Africa
- Z. fuligineus (Purcell, 1907) – Ethiopia, DR Congo, Kenya, Tanzania, Namibia, South Africa, Lesotho
- Z. fulvaster (Simon, 1878) – France (Corsica), Italy, North Macedonia, Bulgaria, Greece, Turkey, Cyprus, Russia (Europe), Iran
- Z. fulvopilosus (Simon, 1878) – Portugal, Spain, France
- Z. funereus (Dalmas, 1921) – St. Helena
- Z. funestus (Keyserling, 1887) – United States
- Z. fuscimanus (Kroneberg, 1875) – Uzbekistan
- Z. fuscorufus (Simon, 1878) – Spain, France (Corsica), Italy, Algeria, Libya
- Z. fuscus (Thorell, 1875) – Ukraine, Russia (Europe, Caucasus), Kazakhstan
- Z. fuzeta Wunderlich, 2011 – Portugal
- Z. gabriel Platnick & Shadab, 1983 – United States
- Z. gallicus Simon, 1914 – Europe, Caucasus (Russia), Kazakhstan
- Z. galunae Levy, 1998 – Israel
- Z. gattefossei Denis, 1952 – Morocco
- Z. gertschi Platnick & Shadab, 1983 – United States, Mexico
- Z. geshur Levy, 2009 – Israel
- Z. golanensis Levy, 2009 – Israel
- Z. gooldi (Purcell, 1907) – Namibia, Botswana, South Africa
- Z. graecus (L. Koch, 1867) – Greece
- Z. griswoldi Platnick & Shadab, 1983 – United States
- Z. grovus Platnick & Shadab, 1983 – United States
- Z. guineanus (Simon, 1907) – West, Central, East Africa
- Z. gussakovskyi Charitonov, 1951 – Tajikistan
- Z. gynethus Chamberlin, 1919 – United States
- Z. haifaensis Levy, 2009 – Israel
- Z. hanangensis FitzPatrick, 2007 – Tanzania
- Z. haplodrassoides (Denis, 1955) – Niger, Ethiopia, South Africa
- Z. hardwar Platnick & Shadab, 1983 – Jamaica
- Z. harmeron Levy, 2009 – North Macedonia, Bulgaria, Greece, Turkey, Cyprus, Israel, Iran
- Z. haroni FitzPatrick, 2007 – Zimbabwe, Malawi
- Z. hayashii Kamura, 1987 – Japan
- Z. hazarmerdensis Zamani & Marusik, 2024 – Iraq
- Z. helanshan Tang, Urita, Song & Zhao, 1997 – Russia (Altai), China
- Z. helicoides Chatzaki, 2010 – Greece (Crete)
- Z. helsdingeni Zhang & Song, 2001 – China
- Z. henderickxi Bosselaers, 2012 – Canary Islands
- Z. hentzi Barrows, 1945 – Canada, United States
- Z. hermani (Chyzer, 1897) – Central Europe, Russia (Europe, Caucasus), Turkey, Georgia
- Z. hirtus (Thorell, 1875) – France
- Z. hispaliensis Senglet, 2011 – Spain
- Z. histio Chatzaki, 2021 – Greece
- Z. holguin Alayón, 1992 – Cuba
- Z. hospitus (Simon, 1897) – Pakistan
- Z. hui Platnick & Song, 1986 – Kazakhstan, China
- Z. humilis (Purcell, 1907) – Zimbabwe, South Africa
- Z. hummeli Schenkel, 1936 – Kazakhstan, China
- Z. hyrcanus Zamani, Chatzaki, Esyunin & Marusik, 2021 – Iran
- Z. ibayensis FitzPatrick, 2007 – Tanzania
- Z. icenoglei Platnick & Shadab, 1983 – United States
- Z. illustris Butt & Beg, 2004 – Pakistan
- Z. imazigheni Barrientos, 2024 – Spain
- Z. incertissimus Caporiacco, 1934 – Libya
- Z. inderensis Ponomarev & Tsvetkov, 2006 – Kazakhstan
- Z. inglenook Platnick & Shadab, 1983 – United States
- Z. inqayi FitzPatrick, 2007 – Congo
- Z. insulanus (L. Koch, 1867) – Greece
- Z. insulanus Dalmas, 1922 – Italy
- Z. invidus (Purcell, 1907) – Namibia, South Africa
- Z. iriomotensis Kamura, 1994 – Japan
- Z. itandae FitzPatrick, 2007 – Congo
- Z. ivieorum Platnick & Shadab, 1983 – Mexico
- Z. jabalpurensis Tikader & Gajbe, 1976 – India
- Z. jakesi Zamani & Marusik, 2022 – Iraq
- Z. jamaicensis Platnick & Shadab, 1983 – Jamaica
- Z. jocquei FitzPatrick, 2007 – Kenya
- Z. josephine Platnick & Shadab, 1983 – United States
- Z. katombora FitzPatrick, 2007 – Zimbabwe
- Z. keumjeungsanensis Paik, 1986 – China, Korea
- Z. khatlonicus Fomichev & Marusik, 2021 – Tajikistan
- Z. khostensis Kovblyuk & Ponomarev, 2008 – Italy, Caucasus (Russia, Georgia, Azerbaijan), Iran
- Z. kimi Paik, 1992 – Korea
- Z. kimwha Paik, 1986 – Russia (Far East), Korea, Japan
- Z. konarus Roewer, 1961 – Afghanistan
- Z. kulempikus FitzPatrick, 2007 – Kenya
- Z. kulukhunus FitzPatrick, 2007 – Burkina Faso, Chad
- Z. kumazomba FitzPatrick, 2007 – Malawi
- Z. kuncinyanus FitzPatrick, 2007 – South Africa
- Z. kuntzi Denis, 1953 – Yemen
- Z. kusumae Tikader, 1982 – India
- Z. laccus (Barrows, 1919) – Canada, United States
- Z. laconicus Senglet, 2011 – Greece
- Z. laetus (O. Pickard-Cambridge, 1872) – North Africa, Senegal, Kenya, Portugal, France, Greece (Crete), Turkey, Israel, Saudi Arabia, Iraq, Iran., Introduced to Hawaii, United States, Mexico, Peru, Galapagos, Ascension Island
- Z. laghmanus Roewer, 1961 – Afghanistan
- Z. lagrecai Di Franco, 1994 – Portugal, Spain, Morocco
- Z. lapiazi Lecigne, 2025 – Morocco
- Z. lapicidinae Wunderlich, 2024 – Portugal
- Z. lasalanus Chamberlin, 1928 – Canada, United States, Mexico
- Z. latreillei (Simon, 1878) – Europe, Turkey, Caucasus, Russia (Europe to South Siberia), Kazakhstan
- Z. lavus Tucker, 1923 – Namibia, Zimbabwe, South Africa
- Z. lehavim Levy, 2009 – Israel
- Z. liaoi Platnick & Song, 1986 – China, Taiwan
- Z. lichenyensis FitzPatrick, 2007 – Malawi
- Z. lightfooti (Purcell, 1907) – South Africa
- Z. limnatis Chatzaki & Russell-Smith, 2017 – Greece, Cyprus
- Z. lividus Mello-Leitão, 1943 – Argentina
- Z. longinquus (L. Koch, 1866) – Algeria
- Z. longipes (L. Koch, 1866) – Europe, Turkey, Caucasus, Russia (Europe to Far East), Iran, Kazakhstan, Central Asia, Mongolia, China, Korea
- Z. lotzi FitzPatrick, 2007 – South Africa
- Z. lubumbashi FitzPatrick, 2007 – Congo
- Z. lutorius (Tullgren, 1910) – Tanzania
- Z. lymnophilus Chamberlin, 1936 – United States
- Z. maccaricus Di Franco, 1998 – Italy (Sicily)
- Z. maindroni (Simon, 1905) – India
- Z. mandae Tikader & Gajbe, 1979 – India
- Z. mandlaensis Tikader & Gajbe, 1976 – India
- Z. manius (Simon, 1878) – Portugal, Spain, France
- Z. manzae (Strand, 1908) – Canary Islands
- Z. maroccanus Zamani & Marusik, 2025 – Morocco
- Z. mashonus FitzPatrick, 2007 – DR Congo, Botswana, Zimbabwe, South Africa
- Z. matobensis FitzPatrick, 2007 – Zimbabwe
- Z. mayanus Chamberlin & Ivie, 1938 – Mexico
- Z. mazumbai FitzPatrick, 2007 – Tanzania
- Z. mediocris (Kulczyński, 1901) – Ethiopia
- Z. meinsohni Denis, 1954 – Morocco
- Z. meronensis Levy, 1998 – Israel
- Z. mesa Platnick & Shadab, 1983 – United States, Mexico
- Z. messinai Di Franco, 1995 – Italy (Sicily)
- Z. metellus Roewer, 1928 – France, Italy, Albania, Greece, Iran, Israel, Russia (Europe)
- Z. mikhailovi Marusik, 1995 – Russia (Europe), Kazakhstan, Mongolia
- Z. minous Chatzaki, 2003 – Greece (Crete, Karpathos)
- Z. miramar Platnick & Shadab, 1983 – Mexico
- Z. mkomazi FitzPatrick, 2007 – Tanzania
- Z. moestus (O. Pickard-Cambridge, 1898) – Mexico
- Z. monachus Chamberlin, 1924 – United States, Mexico
- Z. monodens Chamberlin, 1936 – United States
- Z. mosioatunya FitzPatrick, 2007 – Botswana, Zambia, Zimbabwe
- Z. muizenbergensis FitzPatrick, 2007 – South Africa
- Z. mulanjensis FitzPatrick, 2007 – Malawi
- Z. mundus (Kulczyński, 1897) – Europe, Russia (Europe to South Siberia), Kazakhstan, Iran, China
- Z. murcidus Simon, 1914 – France
- Z. murphyorum FitzPatrick, 2007 – Kenya
- Z. musapi FitzPatrick, 2007 – Zimbabwe
- Z. nainitalensis Tikader & Gajbe, 1976 – India
- Z. naliniae Tikader & Gajbe, 1979 – India
- Z. namaquus FitzPatrick, 2007 – South Africa
- Z. namibensis FitzPatrick, 2007 – Namibia, South Africa
- Z. nannodes Chamberlin, 1936 – United States
- Z. naphthalii Levy, 2009 – Israel
- Z. nasikensis Tikader & Gajbe, 1976 – India
- Z. natalensis Tucker, 1923 – Mozambique, South Africa
- Z. ngomensis FitzPatrick, 2007 – South Africa
- Z. nilgirinus Reimoser, 1934 – India
- Z. nishikawai Kamura, 2010 – Taiwan
- Z. nyathii FitzPatrick, 2007 – Congo, Botswana, Zimbabwe
- Z. oblongus (C. L. Koch, 1833) – Europe, Turkey
- Z. ocala Platnick & Shadab, 1983 – United States
- Z. occidentalis Melic, 2014 – Portugal, Spain
- Z. occultus Tuneva & Esyunin, 2003 – Russia (Europe, Urals)
- Z. olympi (Kulczyński, 1903) – Kosovo, North Macedonia, Bulgaria, Greece, Turkey, Ukraine, Russia (Caucasus)
- Z. orenburgensis Tuneva & Esyunin, 2003 – Ukraine, Russia (Europe, Caucasus), Kazakhstan
- Z. oryx (Simon, 1880) – Morocco, Algeria
- Z. otavi FitzPatrick, 2007 – Namibia, Botswana, South Africa
- Z. ovambensis Lawrence, 1927 – Namibia, South Africa
- Z. ovtsharenkoi Zhang & Song, 2001 – China
- Z. pakistaniensis Butt & Beg, 2004 – Pakistan
- Z. pallidipes Tucker, 1923 – Namibia, South Africa
- Z. paradderet Levy, 2009 – Israel
- Z. paraegregius Wunderlich, 2012 – Canary Islands
- Z. paranaensis Mello-Leitão, 1947 – Brazil
- Z. parascrutatus Levy, 1998 – Greece (Rhodes), Israel
- Z. paroculus Simon, 1914 – France, Italy
- Z. parvioculi (Wunderlich, 2022) – Portugal
- Z. pediculatoides Senglet, 2011 – Spain
- Z. pediculatus Marinaro, 1968 – Portugal, Spain, Morocco, Algeria, Israel
- Z. pedimaculosus Tucker, 1923 – Namibia
- Z. perditus Chamberlin, 1922 – United States
- Z. petrensis (C. L. Koch, 1839) – Europe, Turkey, Caucasus, Russia (Europe to South Siberia), Central Asia
- Z. petrophilus Chamberlin, 1936 – United States
- Z. pexus (Simon, 1885) – India
- Z. piceus (Kroneberg, 1875) – Tajikistan
- Z. piercy Platnick & Shadab, 1983 – United States
- Z. pinos Platnick & Shadab, 1983 – United States
- Z. planiger Roewer, 1961 – Afghanistan
- Z. plumiger (L. Koch, 1882) – Spain (Majorca)
- Z. pluridentatus Marinaro, 1968 – Algeria
- Z. poecilochroaeformis Denis, 1937 – Algeria, Tunisia, Malta
- Z. poonaensis Tikader & Gajbe, 1976 – India
- Z. potanini Schenkel, 1963 – Russia (Urals to Far East), Kazakhstan, Iran, Mongolia, China, Korea, Japan
- Z. prishutovae Ponomarev & Tsvetkov, 2006 – Greece, Turkey, Ukraine, Russia (Europe)
- Z. pseudoapricorum Schenkel, 1963 – Kazakhstan, China
- Z. pseudogallicus Ponomarev, 2007 – Ukraine, Russia (Europe to West Siberia), Kazakhstan
- Z. pseudopusillus Caporiacco, 1934 – India
- Z. pseustes Chamberlin, 1922 – United States, Mexico
- Z. pulchellus Butt & Beg, 2004 – Pakistan
- Z. pulchripes (Purcell, 1908) – South Africa
- Z. pullus (Bryant, 1936) – United States
- Z. puritanus Chamberlin, 1922 – Alaska, Canada, United States, Mexico, Europe, Turkey, Russia (Europe to Far East), Kazakhstan, Iran
- Z. pyrenaeus Di Franco & Blick, 2003 – France
- Z. quipungo FitzPatrick, 2007 – Angola
- Z. qwabergensis FitzPatrick, 2007 – South Africa
- Z. radiatus Lawrence, 1928 – Namibia, Botswana, Zimbabwe, South Africa
- Z. rainier Platnick & Shadab, 1983 – United States
- Z. reduncus (Purcell, 1907) – South Africa, Lesotho
- Z. reimoseri Roewer, 1951 – France
- Z. remyi Denis, 1954 – Algeria
- Z. resolution FitzPatrick, 2007 – South Africa
- Z. reuteri Zamani & Marusik, 2025 – Morocco
- Z. rinske van Helsdingen, 2012 – Italy
- Z. rothschildi (Simon, 1909) – Ethiopia, Congo
- Z. rufi Efimik, 1997 – Russia (Europe), Kazakhstan
- Z. rugege FitzPatrick, 2007 – Congo, Rwanda
- Z. rungwensis FitzPatrick, 2007 – Tanzania
- Z. sajali Tikader & Gajbe, 1979 – India
- Z. sanmen Platnick & Song, 1986 – China
- Z. santos Platnick & Shadab, 1983 – Mexico
- Z. sarawakensis (Thorell, 1890) – Iran, Pakistan, Indonesia, (Borneo)
- Z. sardus (Canestrini, 1873) – France, Italy
- Z. sataraensis Tikader & Gajbe, 1979 – India
- Z. sclateri Tucker, 1923 – South Africa, Lesotho
- Z. scrutatus (O. Pickard-Cambridge, 1872) – Canary Islands, Italy (Sicily), Greece, Cyprus, Turkey, Africa, Central Asia
- Z. segrex (Simon, 1878) – Europe, Turkey, Caucasus, Russia, (Europe)
- Z. serratus Wunderlich, 2011 – Portugal, Spain
- Z. shabae FitzPatrick, 2007 – Congo
- Z. shaked Levy, 1998 – Greece, Turkey, Israel
- Z. shantae Tikader, 1982 – India, China
- Z. siculus (Simon, 1878) – Italy (Sicily)
- Z. similis (Kulczyński, 1887) – Italy, Central Europe, Ukraine and Turkey
- Z. sindi Caporiacco, 1934 – Pakistan, India
- Z. singroboensis Jézéquel, 1965 – Ivory Coast
- Z. siyabonga FitzPatrick, 2007 – Zimbabwe
- Z. skinnerensis Platnick & Prentice, 1999 – United States
- Z. somaliensis FitzPatrick, 2007 – Somalia
- Z. songus FitzPatrick, 2007 – South Africa
- Z. soulouensis FitzPatrick, 2007 – Burkina Faso
- Z. spadix (L. Koch, 1866) – Portugal, Spain, Greece, Morocco, Algeria, Tunisia
- Z. spilosus Yin, 2012 – China
- Z. spinulosus Denis, 1958 – Afghanistan
- Z. stolidus (Simon, 1880) – Algeria, Libya
- Z. strandi (Nosek, 1905) – Albania, Bulgaria, Greece, Turkey
- Z. subaeneus (Simon, 1886) – Senegal
- Z. subterraneus (C. L. Koch, 1833) – Europe, Cyprus, Turkey, Caucasus, Russia (Europe to Far East), Kazakhstan, Central Asia, China (type species)
- Z. sula Lowrie & Gertsch, 1955 – Russia (Far East), Alaska, Canada, United States, Mexico
- Z. surekhae Tikader & Gajbe, 1976 – India
- Z. swelus FitzPatrick, 2007 – Congo
- Z. taliblii Nuruyeva, Ponomarev & Snegovaya, 2025 – Azerbaijan
- Z. talpa Platnick & Shadab, 1983 – Mexico
- Z. talpinus (L. Koch, 1872) – Western, Central Europe, Italy
- Z. tambaramensis Caleb & Mathai, 2013 – India
- Z. tarsalis Fage, 1929 – Algeria, Libya
- Z. tendererus FitzPatrick, 2007 – Malawi, Zambia, Zimbabwe
- Z. tenuis (L. Koch, 1866) – Mediterranean and Central Europe, Russia, (Caucasus), Introduced to Galapagos Is., United States
- Z. tetramamillatus (Caporiacco, 1947) – Tanzania
- Z. thorelli Simon, 1914 – Portugal, Spain, France
- Z. tongdao Yin, Bao & Zhang, 1999 – China
- Z. tortuosus Kamura, 1987 – Korea, Japan
- Z. tragicus (O. Pickard-Cambridge, 1872) – Morocco, Algeria, Tunisia, Libya, Egypt, Chad, Ethiopia, Israel
- Z. trimaculatus Mello-Leitão, 1930 – Brazil
- Z. tristis (Thorell, 1871) – Sweden
- Z. tropicalis FitzPatrick, 2007 – West, Central Africa
- Z. tsaii Platnick & Song, 1986 – China
- Z. tuckeri Roewer, 1951 – Ethiopia, East Africa, Kenya, Namibia, Botswana, Zimbabwe, Mozambique, South Africa
- Z. tulare Platnick & Shadab, 1983 – United States
- Z. tuobus Chamberlin, 1919 – Canada, United States
- Z. turanicus Charitonov, 1946 – Uzbekistan
- Z. turcicus Seyyar, Demir & Aktaş, 2010 – Turkey
- Z. ubicki Platnick & Shadab, 1983 – Mexico
- Z. uniformis Mello-Leitão, 1941 – Argentina
- Z. union Platnick & Shadab, 1983 – Mexico
- Z. univittatus (Simon, 1897) – Pakistan
- Z. uquathus FitzPatrick, 2007 – South Africa
- Z. uronesae Melic, 2014 – Spain
- Z. vespertinus (Thorell, 1875) – France, Italy, Bulgaria, North Macedonia
- Z. vikela FitzPatrick, 2007 – Senegal
- Z. viola Platnick & Shadab, 1983 – United States
- Z. viveki Gajbe, 2005 – India
- Z. wallacei Melic, Silva & Barrientos, 2016 – Portugal, Spain
- Z. wuchangensis Schenkel, 1963 – China, Korea
- Z. wunderlichi Blick, 2017 – Turkey
- Z. xerophilus Levy, 1998 – Israel
- Z. xiaoi Yin, Bao & Zhang, 1999 – China, Korea
- Z. yani Yin, Bao & Zhang, 1999 – China
- Z. yinae Platnick & Song, 1986 – China
- Z. yogeshi Gajbe, 2005 – India
- Z. yosemite Platnick & Shadab, 1983 – United States
- Z. zekharya Levy, 2009 – Cyprus, Israel, Iran
- Z. zellensis Grimm, 1982 – Alps (Germany, Austria, Italy)
- Z. zephyrus Kamura, 1999 – Japan (Ryukyu Is.)
- Z. zhaoi Platnick & Song, 1986 – Russia (Far East), China
- Z. zhengi Platnick & Song, 1986 – China
- Z. zhui Yang & Tang, 2003 – China
- Z. zin Levy, 1998 – Greece (Rhodes, Symi), Israel
- Z. zonognathus (Purcell, 1907) – Mali, Ivory Coast, DR Congo, Namibia, Zimbabwe, South Africa
