= Zelotes tuckeri =

Tucker's Dark Ground Spider

Conservation status
- Least Concern (SANBI Red List)

Scientific classification
- Kingdom: Animalia
- Phylum: Arthropoda
- Subphylum: Chelicerata
- Class: Arachnida
- Order: Araneae
- Infraorder: Araneomorphae
- Family: Gnaphosidae
- Genus: Zelotes
- Species: Z. tuckeri

Binomial name
- Zelotes tuckeri Roewer, 1951

Synonyms
- Zelotes rufipes Tucker, 1923 (preoccupied)

Species of spider

Zelotes tuckeri is a species of spider in the family Gnaphosidae. It is commonly known as Tucker's dark ground spider and occurs widely in Africa.

== Distribution ==
Zelotes tuckeri is known from more than seven African countries: Botswana, East Africa, Ethiopia, Kenya, Namibia, Zimbabwe, Mozambique, and South Africa. In South Africa, it has been recorded from six provinces: Eastern Cape, Free State, Gauteng, KwaZulu-Natal, Limpopo, and Mpumalanga.

== Habitat and ecology ==
The species has a wide altitudinal range, occurring from 17 to 1,645 m above sea level. They are free-running ground spiders found under stones during the day and inhabit the Grassland, Indian Ocean Coastal Belt, and Savanna biomes.

== Conservation ==
Zelotes tuckeri is listed as Least Concern by the South African National Biodiversity Institute due to its wide range. The species is sampled from more than ten protected areas. There are no significant threats to the species.

== Etymology ==
The species is named after South African arachnologist Richard William Ethelbert Tucker.

== Taxonomy ==
The species was originally described by Tucker in 1923 as Zelotes rufipes, but this name was preoccupied. Roewer provided the replacement name Zelotes tuckeri in 1951. The species was revised by Moira FitzPatrick in 2007 and is known from both sexes.
