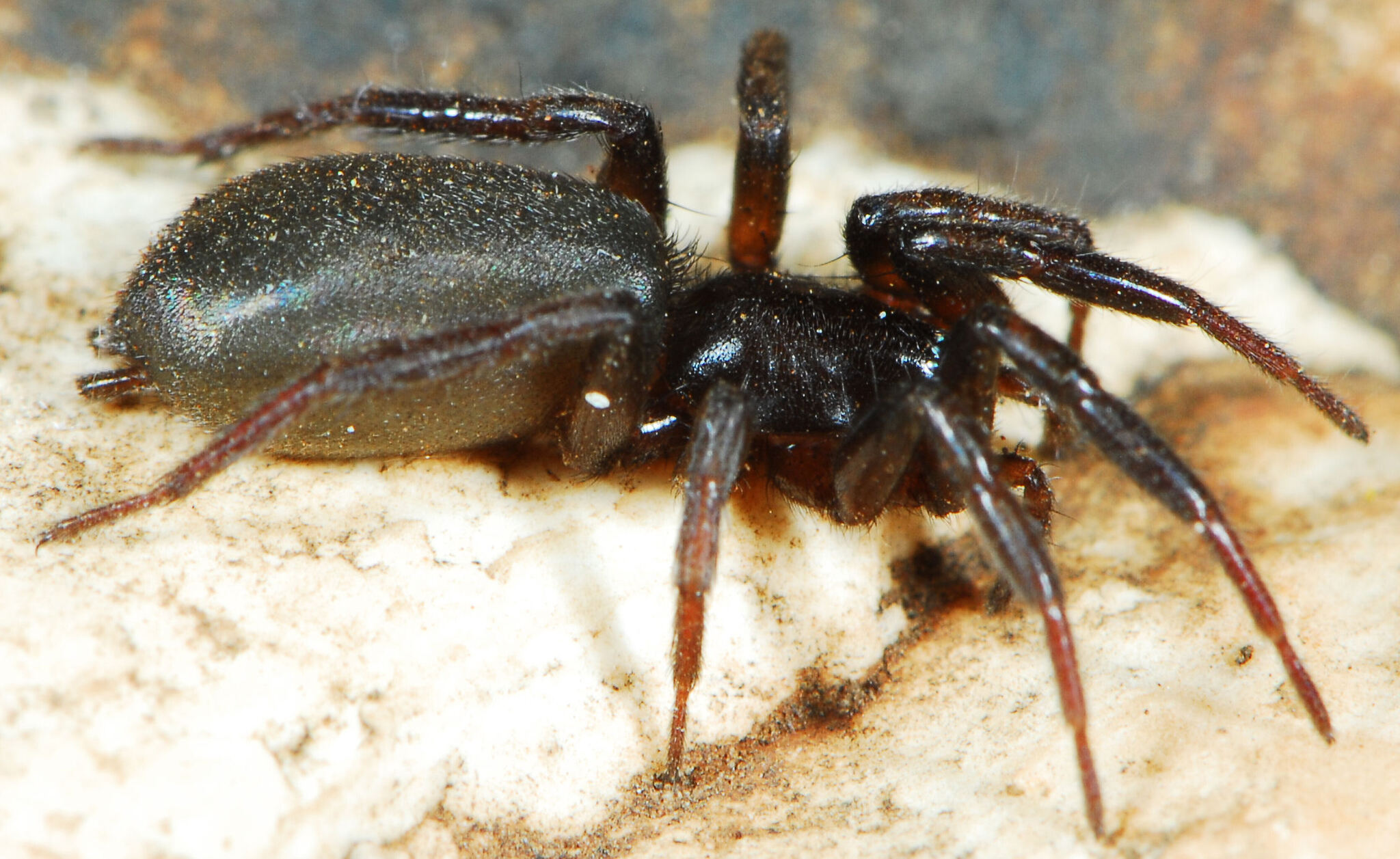
- Female
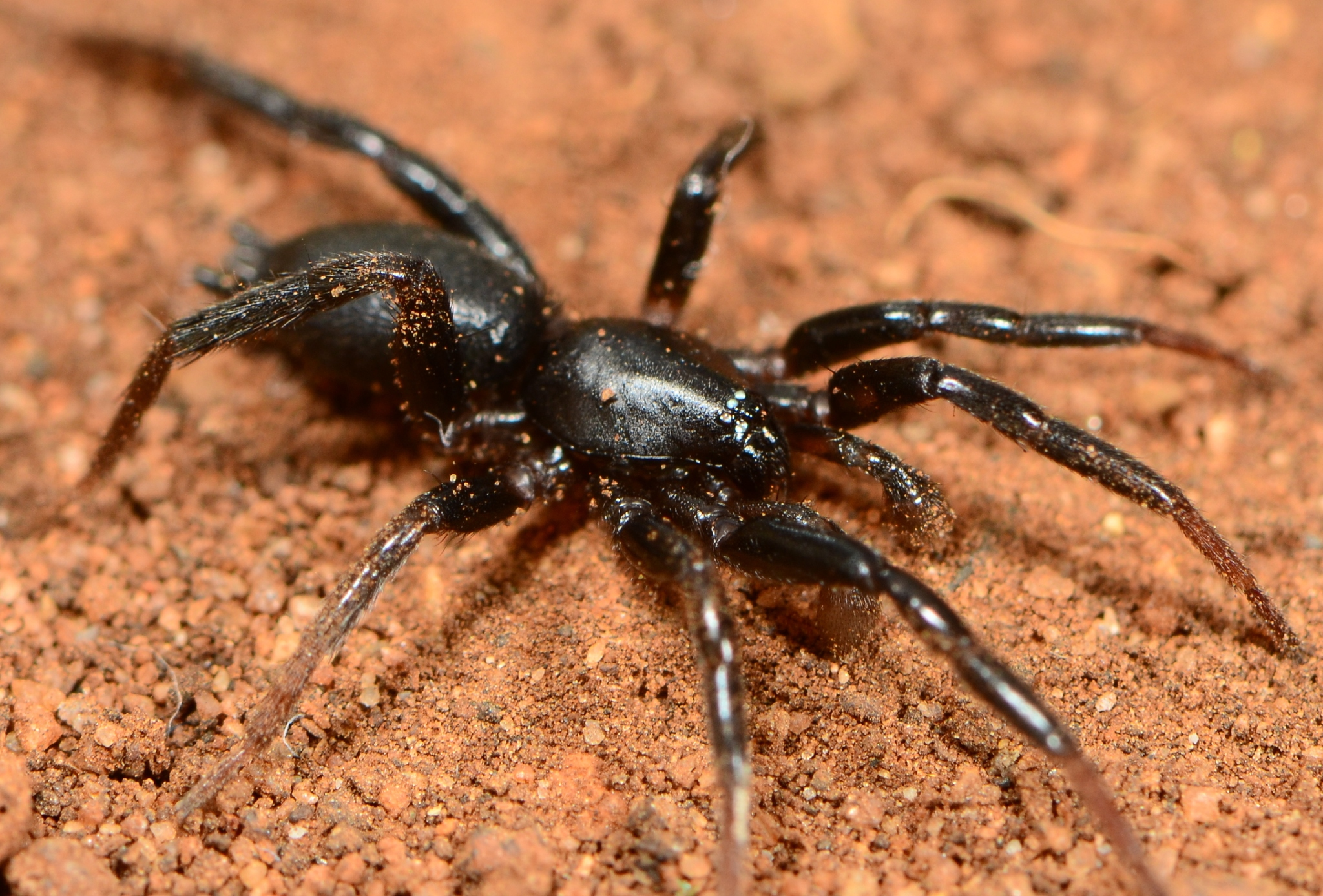
- Male

Scientific classification
- Kingdom: Animalia
- Phylum: Arthropoda
- Subphylum: Chelicerata
- Class: Arachnida
- Order: Araneae
- Infraorder: Araneomorphae
- Family: Gnaphosidae
- Genus: Zelotes
- Species: Z. natalensis

Binomial name
- Zelotes natalensis Tucker, 1923

Synonyms
- Zelotes ungula Tucker, 1923

= Zelotes natalensis =

Natal Dark Ground Spider

Species of spider

Zelotes natalensis is a species of spider in the family Gnaphosidae. It is found in southern Africa and is commonly known as the Natal dark ground spider.

== Distribution ==
Zelotes natalensis occurs in Mozambique and South Africa. The species has a wide distribution throughout South Africa and is recorded from eight provinces: Eastern Cape, Free State, Gauteng, KwaZulu-Natal, Limpopo, Mpumalanga, North West, and Western Cape. It occurs at altitudes ranging from 16 to 1,730 m above sea level.

== Description ==
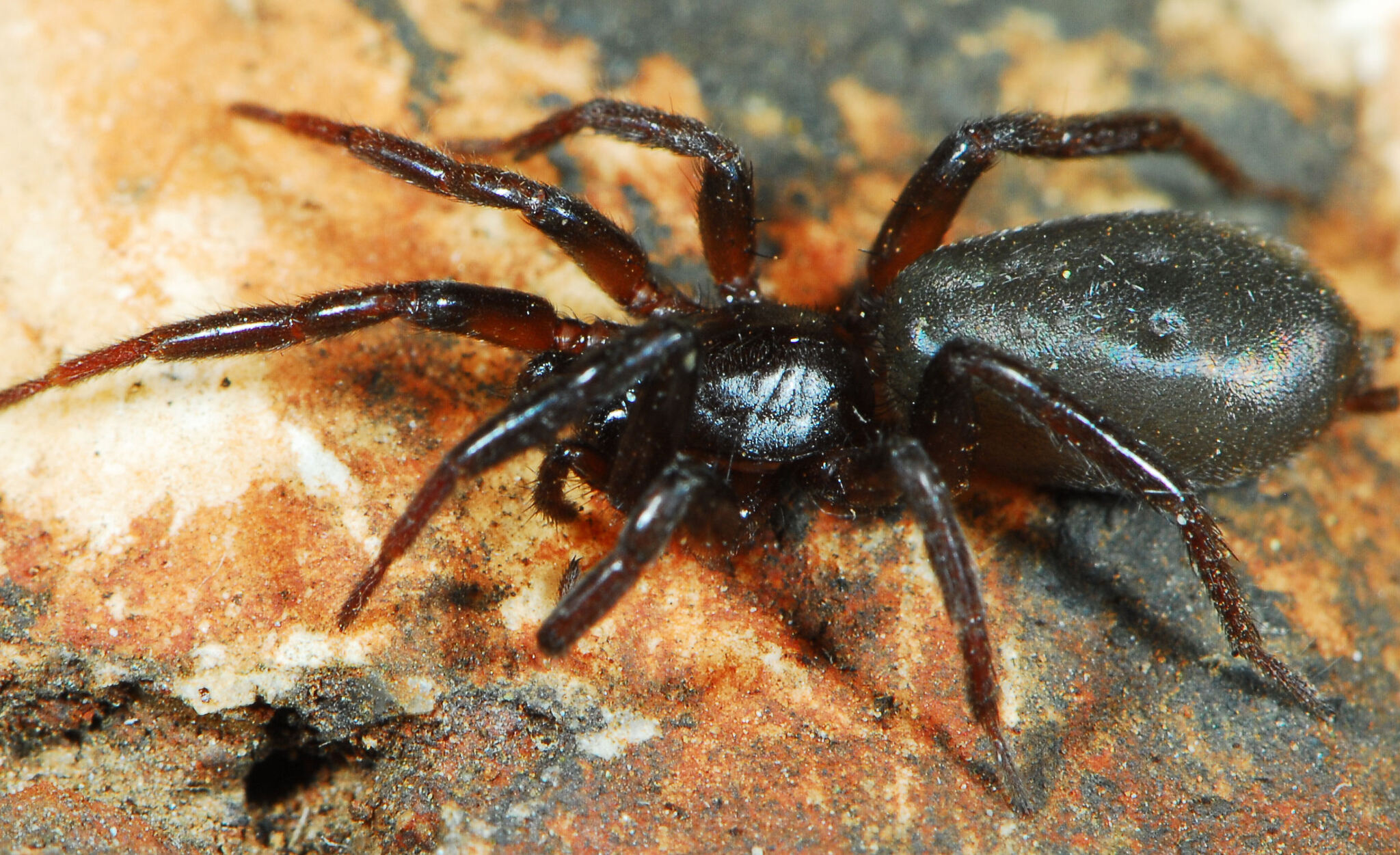
female

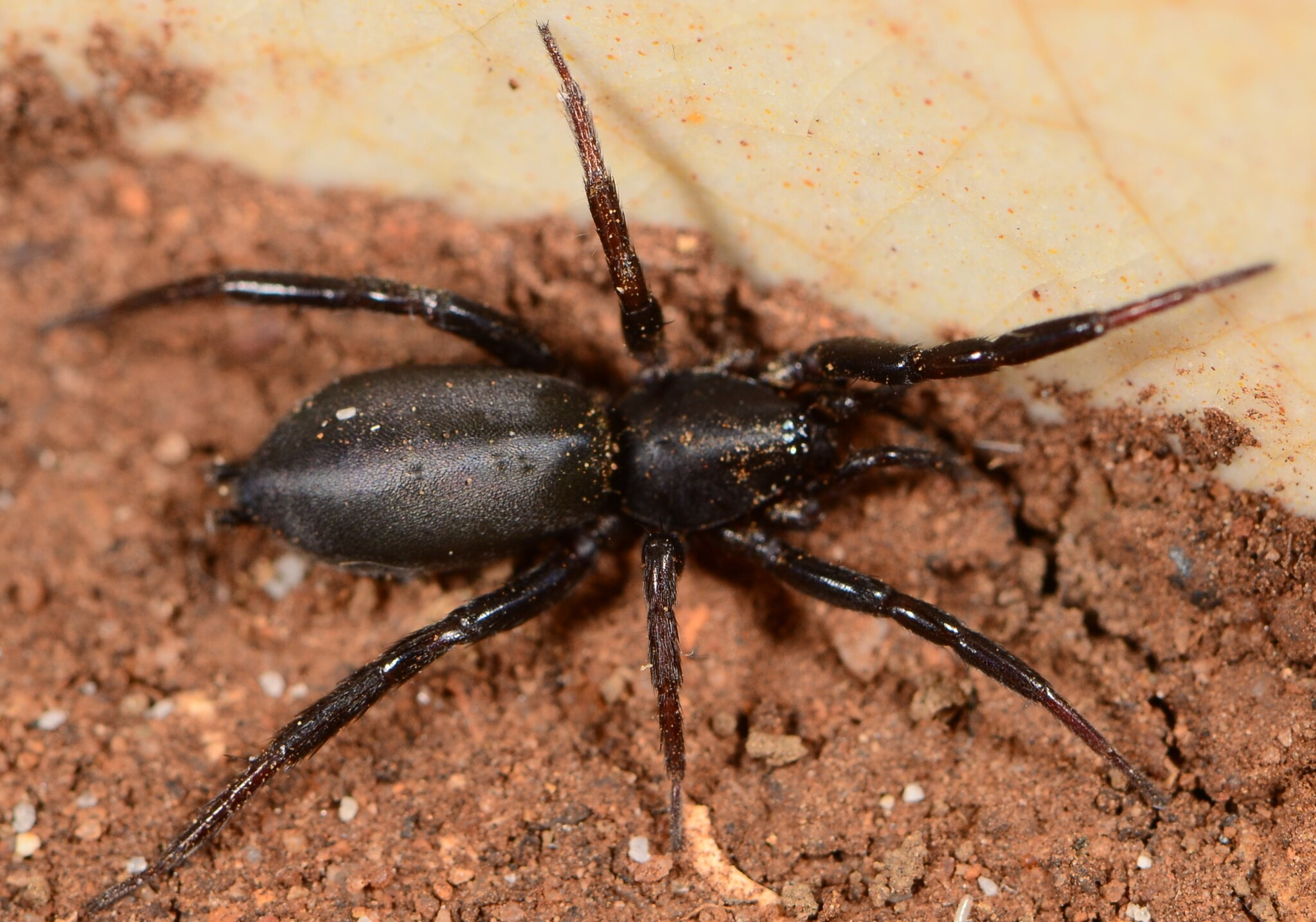
female

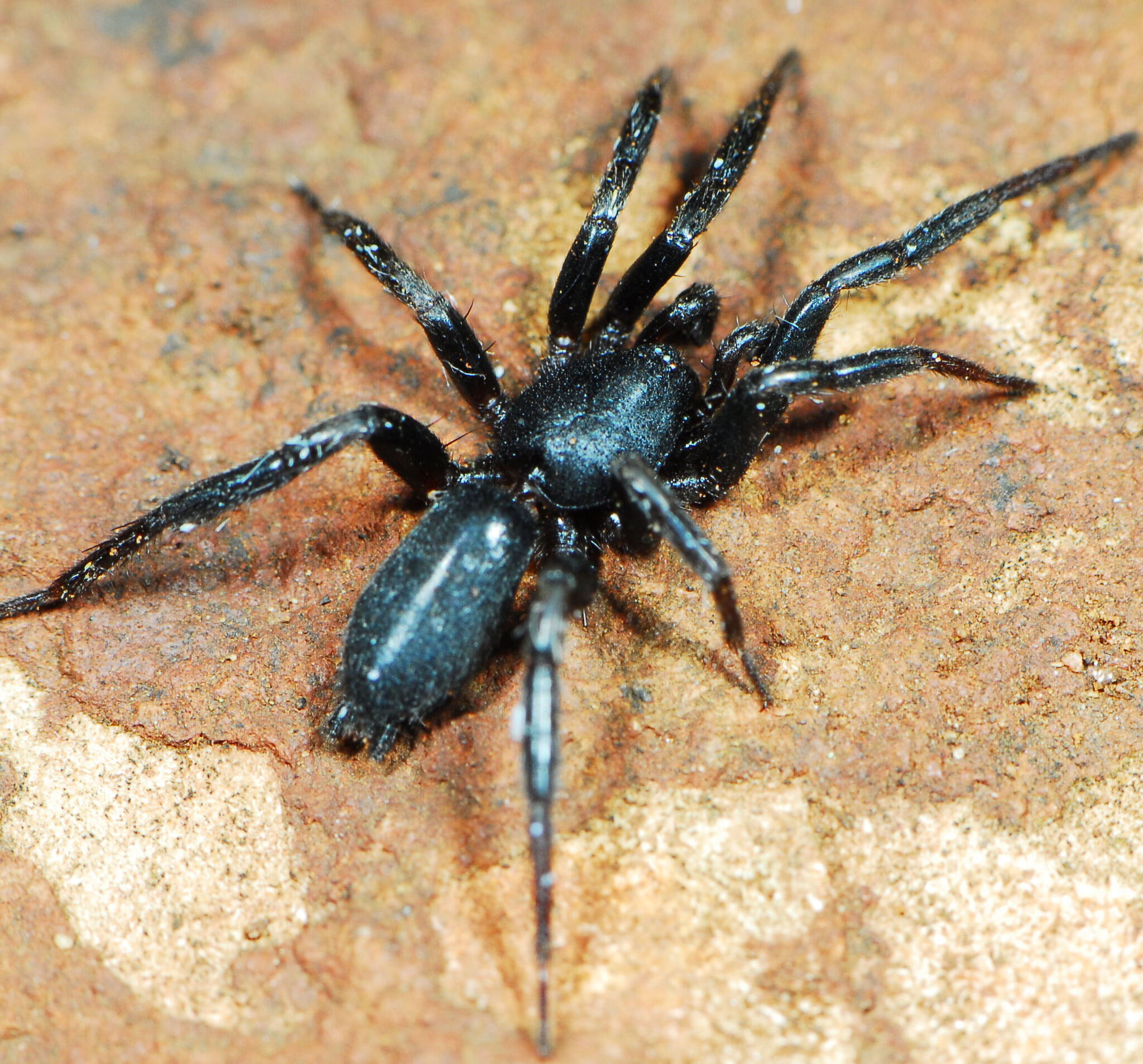
male

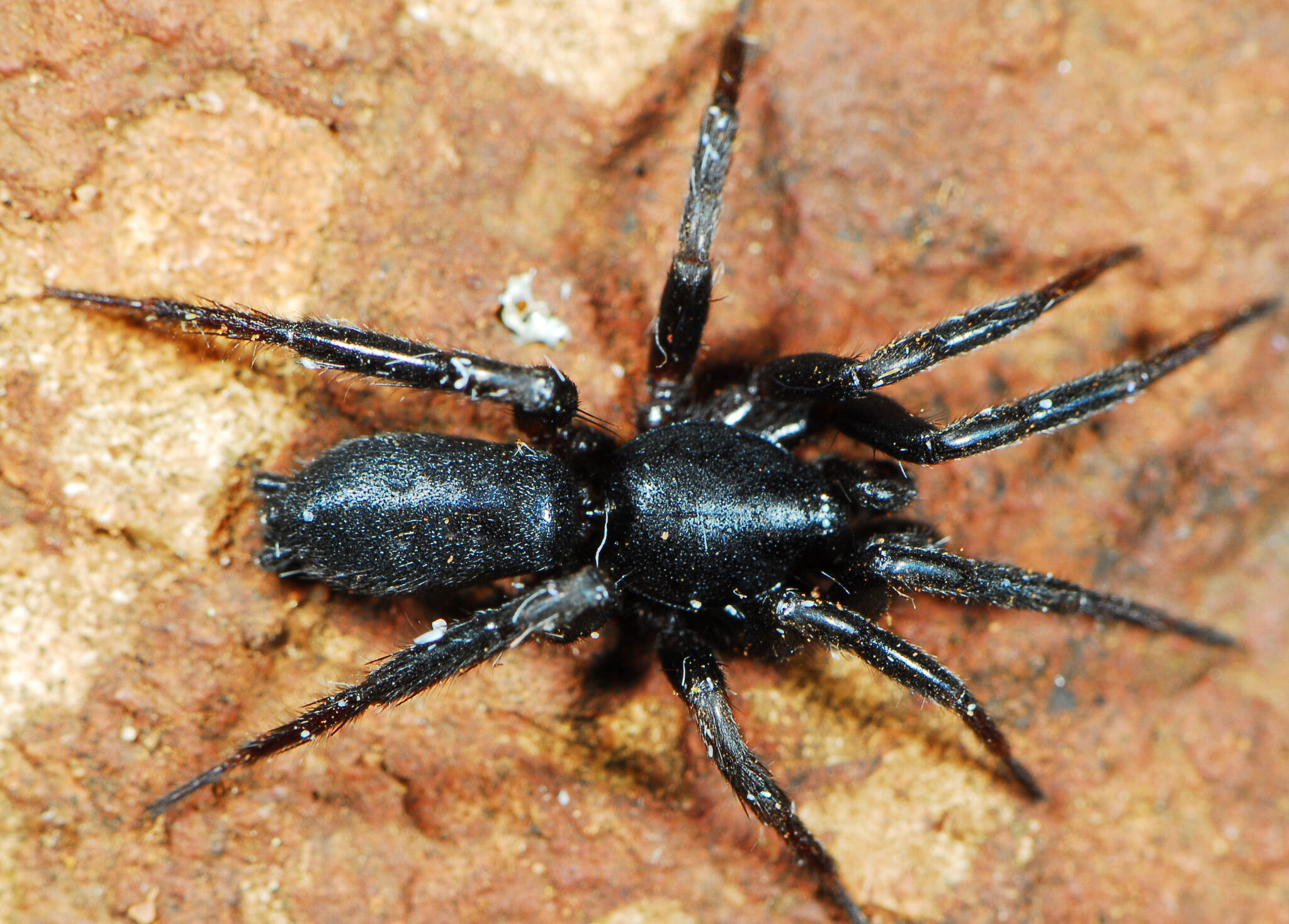
male

== Habitat and ecology ==
Zelotes natalensis are free-running ground spiders found under stones during the day. The species has been sampled from all the floral biomes. It was also sampled from avocado, citrus, cotton, and sunflower crops.

== Conservation ==
Zelotes natalensis is listed as Least Concern by the South African National Biodiversity Institute due to its wide geographic range. There are no significant threats to the species. It is a very abundant species protected in more than ten protected areas.

== Taxonomy ==
The species was described by Tucker in 1923 from Inyalazi River in KwaZulu-Natal. FitzPatrick's 2007 revision synonymized Zelotes ungula Tucker, 1923 with Z. natalensis. The species is known from both sexes.
