= Zelotes puritanus =

Scientific classification
- Kingdom: Animalia
- Phylum: Arthropoda
- Subphylum: Chelicerata
- Class: Arachnida
- Order: Araneae
- Infraorder: Araneomorphae
- Family: Gnaphosidae
- Genus: Zelotes
- Species: Z. puritanus

Binomial name
- Zelotes puritanus Chamberlin, 1922

Synonyms
- Zelotes kodaensis Miller & Buchar, 1977; Zelotes shoshoneus Chamberlin, 1936

Species of spider

Zelotes puritanus is a species of ground spider in the family Gnaphosidae. It is found in North America, Europe, Turkey, and a range from Russia to Kazakhstan.
