= Zelotes radiatus =

Conservation status
- Least Concern (SANBI Red List)

Scientific classification
- Kingdom: Animalia
- Phylum: Arthropoda
- Subphylum: Chelicerata
- Class: Arachnida
- Order: Araneae
- Infraorder: Araneomorphae
- Family: Gnaphosidae
- Genus: Zelotes
- Species: Z. radiatus

Binomial name
- Zelotes radiatus Lawrence, 1928

Synonyms
- Zelotes solitaria Lawrence, 1936

Species of spider

Zelotes radiatus is a species of spider in the family Gnaphosidae. It is endemic to southern Africa.

== Distribution ==
Zelotes radiatus occurs in Botswana, Namibia, Zimbabwe, and South Africa. In South Africa, the species is known from Limpopo province, where it has been recorded from several locations in Kruger National Park.

== Habitat and ecology ==
The species inhabits the Savanna biome at altitudes ranging from 241 to 418 m above sea level. They are free-running ground spiders found under stones during the day.

== Conservation ==
Zelotes radiatus is listed as Least Concern by the South African National Biodiversity Institute due to its wide range. The species is protected in Kruger National Park. There are no significant threats to the species.

== Taxonomy ==
The species was described by Lawrence in 1928 from Namibia and was revised by Moira FitzPatrick in 2007, who synonymized Zelotes solitaria Lawrence, 1936 with this species. It is known from both sexes.
