= Zelotes anthereus =

Scientific classification
- Domain: Eukaryota
- Kingdom: Animalia
- Phylum: Arthropoda
- Subphylum: Chelicerata
- Class: Arachnida
- Order: Araneae
- Infraorder: Araneomorphae
- Family: Gnaphosidae
- Genus: Zelotes
- Species: Z. anthereus

Binomial name
- Zelotes anthereus Chamberlin, 1936

Species of spider

Zelotes anthereus is a species of ground spider in the family Gnaphosidae. It is found in the United States.
