= Zelotes songus =

Scientific classification
- Kingdom: Animalia
- Phylum: Arthropoda
- Subphylum: Chelicerata
- Class: Arachnida
- Order: Araneae
- Infraorder: Araneomorphae
- Family: Gnaphosidae
- Genus: Zelotes
- Species: Z. songus

Binomial name
- Zelotes songus FitzPatrick, 2007

Species of spider

Zelotes songus is a species of spider in the family Gnaphosidae. It is endemic to South Africa.

== Distribution ==
Zelotes songus is endemic to Limpopo province, where it is known only from localities on the Springbok Flats, Tuinplaas and Bekendevlei.

== Habitat and ecology ==
The species inhabits the Savanna biome at altitudes ranging from 982 to 1,516 m above sea level. They are free-running ground spiders found under stones during the day.

== Conservation ==
Zelotes songus is listed as Data Deficient for taxonomic reasons. This area has been extensively sampled, and with only a few specimens collected during that period, the species seems to have a restricted distribution. More sampling is needed to collect the male and determine the species' range. There are no significant threats to the species.

== Taxonomy ==
The species was described by FitzPatrick in 2007. It is known only from the female.
