= Zelotes tenuis =

Scientific classification
- Domain: Eukaryota
- Kingdom: Animalia
- Phylum: Arthropoda
- Subphylum: Chelicerata
- Class: Arachnida
- Order: Araneae
- Infraorder: Araneomorphae
- Family: Gnaphosidae
- Genus: Zelotes
- Species: Z. tenuis

Binomial name
- Zelotes tenuis (L. Koch, 1866)

Species of spider

Zelotes tenuis is a species of ground spider in the family Gnaphosidae. It is found in a range from Mediterranean to Russia (Caucasus), has been introduced into Galapagos Islands, and the United States.
