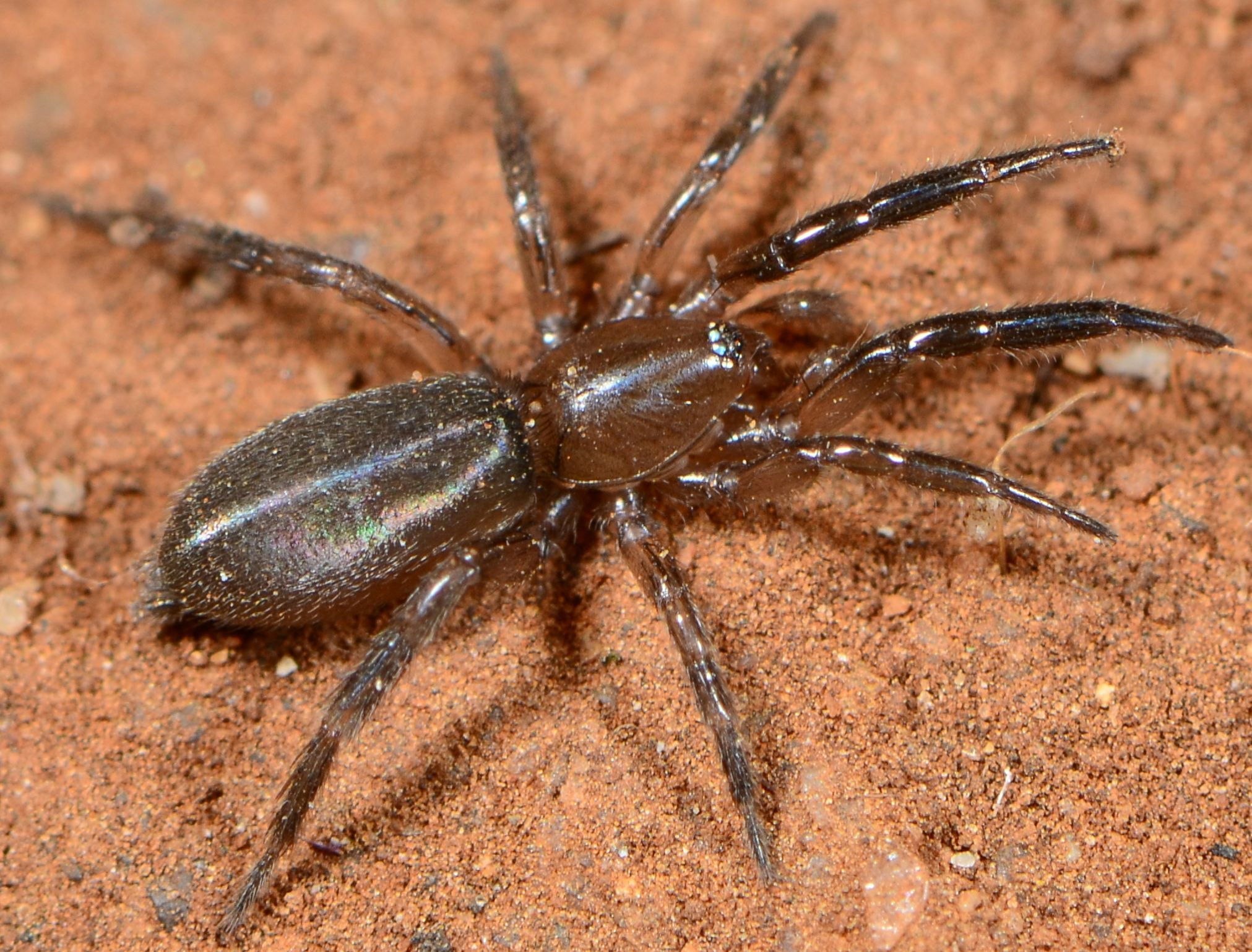
- Female

Scientific classification
- Kingdom: Animalia
- Phylum: Arthropoda
- Subphylum: Chelicerata
- Class: Arachnida
- Order: Araneae
- Infraorder: Araneomorphae
- Family: Gnaphosidae
- Genus: Zelotes
- Species: Z. sclateri

Binomial name
- Zelotes sclateri Tucker, 1923

Synonyms
- Zelotes vryburgensis Tucker, 1923

= Zelotes sclateri =

Lesotho Dark Ground Spider

Species of spider

Zelotes sclateri is a species of spider in the family Gnaphosidae. It is commonly known as Lesotho dark ground spider and occurs in southern Africa.

== Distribution ==
Zelotes sclateri occurs in Lesotho and South Africa. In South Africa, it is widely distributed and recorded from eight provinces, Free State, Gauteng, KwaZulu-Natal, Limpopo, Mpumalanga, Northern Cape, North West, and Western Cape.

== Habitat and ecology ==
The species inhabits the Grassland and Savanna biomes at altitudes ranging from 58 to 1,816 m above sea level. They are free-running ground spiders found under stones during the day. The species has also been sampled from tomato fields.

== Description ==
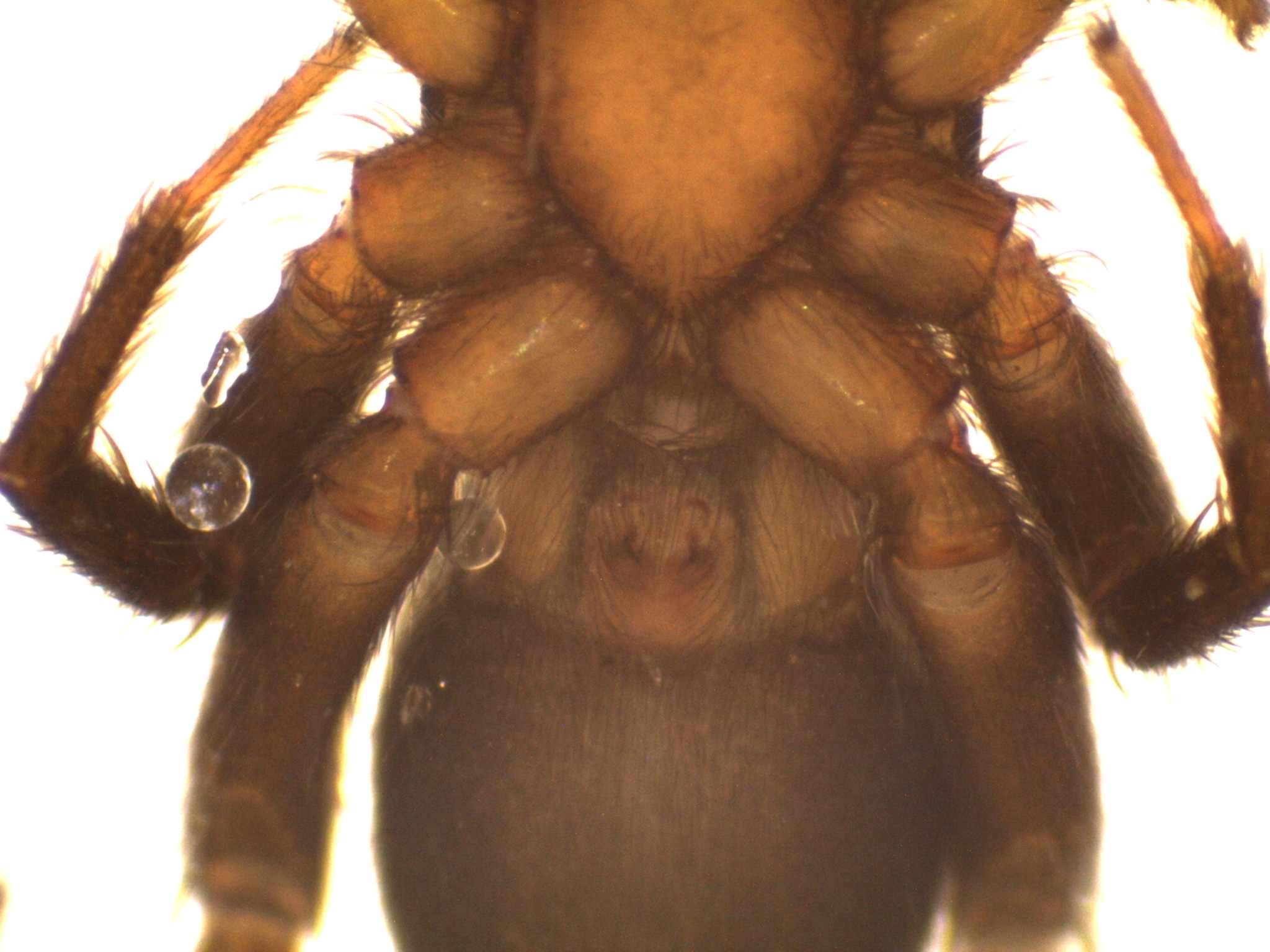
female

== Conservation ==
Zelotes sclateri is listed as Least Concern by the South African National Biodiversity Institute due to its wide geographic range. The species is protected in nine protected areas. It faces no significant threats.

== Taxonomy ==
The species was described by Tucker in 1923 from Lesotho. Moira FitzPatrick (2007) revised the species and synonymized Zelotes vryburgensis Tucker, 1923 with this species. It is known from both sexes.
