= Zelotes chinguli =

Chinguli Dark Ground Spider

Conservation status
- Least Concern (SANBI Red List)

Scientific classification
- Kingdom: Animalia
- Phylum: Arthropoda
- Subphylum: Chelicerata
- Class: Arachnida
- Order: Araneae
- Infraorder: Araneomorphae
- Family: Gnaphosidae
- Genus: Zelotes
- Species: Z. chinguli

Binomial name
- Zelotes chinguli FitzPatrick, 2007

Species of spider

Zelotes chinguli is a species of spider in the family Gnaphosidae. It is commonly known as the Chinguli dark ground spider.

== Distribution ==
Zelotes chinguli is a southern African endemic distributed across Zimbabwe, Botswana, and South Africa. In South Africa, it is recorded only from Limpopo, at altitudes ranging from 504 to 1,093 m above sea level.

== Habitat and ecology ==
The species inhabits the Savanna biome. These are free-running ground spiders that are found under stones during the day.

== Conservation ==
Zelotes chinguli is listed as Least Concern by the South African National Biodiversity Institute due to its wide range in Africa. There are no significant threats to the species. It is protected in Blouberg Nature Reserve, Ben Lavin Nature Reserve, and Maremani Game Reserve.

== Taxonomy ==
The species was described by FitzPatrick in 2007 from Zimbabwe. It is known from both sexes.
