= Zelotes resolution =

Albany's Dark Ground Spider

Conservation status
- Least Concern (SANBI Red List)

Scientific classification
- Kingdom: Animalia
- Phylum: Arthropoda
- Subphylum: Chelicerata
- Class: Arachnida
- Order: Araneae
- Infraorder: Araneomorphae
- Family: Gnaphosidae
- Genus: Zelotes
- Species: Z. resolution

Binomial name
- Zelotes resolution FitzPatrick, 2007

Species of spider

Zelotes resolution is a species of spider in the family Gnaphosidae. It is commonly known as Albany's dark ground spider and is endemic to South Africa.

== Distribution ==
Zelotes resolution is endemic to the Eastern Cape, where it has been recorded from Resolution in Albany, Baviaanskloof Nature Reserve, and Addo Citrus Research Station.

== Habitat and ecology ==
The species inhabits the Thicket biome at altitudes ranging from 39 to 279 m above sea level. They are free-running ground spiders found under stones during the day.

== Conservation ==
Zelotes resolution is listed as Least Concern by the South African National Biodiversity Institute. More sampling is likely to reveal that this species is more widespread, and much natural untransformed habitat remains in its range. The species is protected in the Baviaanskloof Nature Reserve. There are no significant threats to the species.

== Taxonomy ==
The species was described by FitzPatrick in 2007 from Resolution, Albany. It is known from both sexes.
