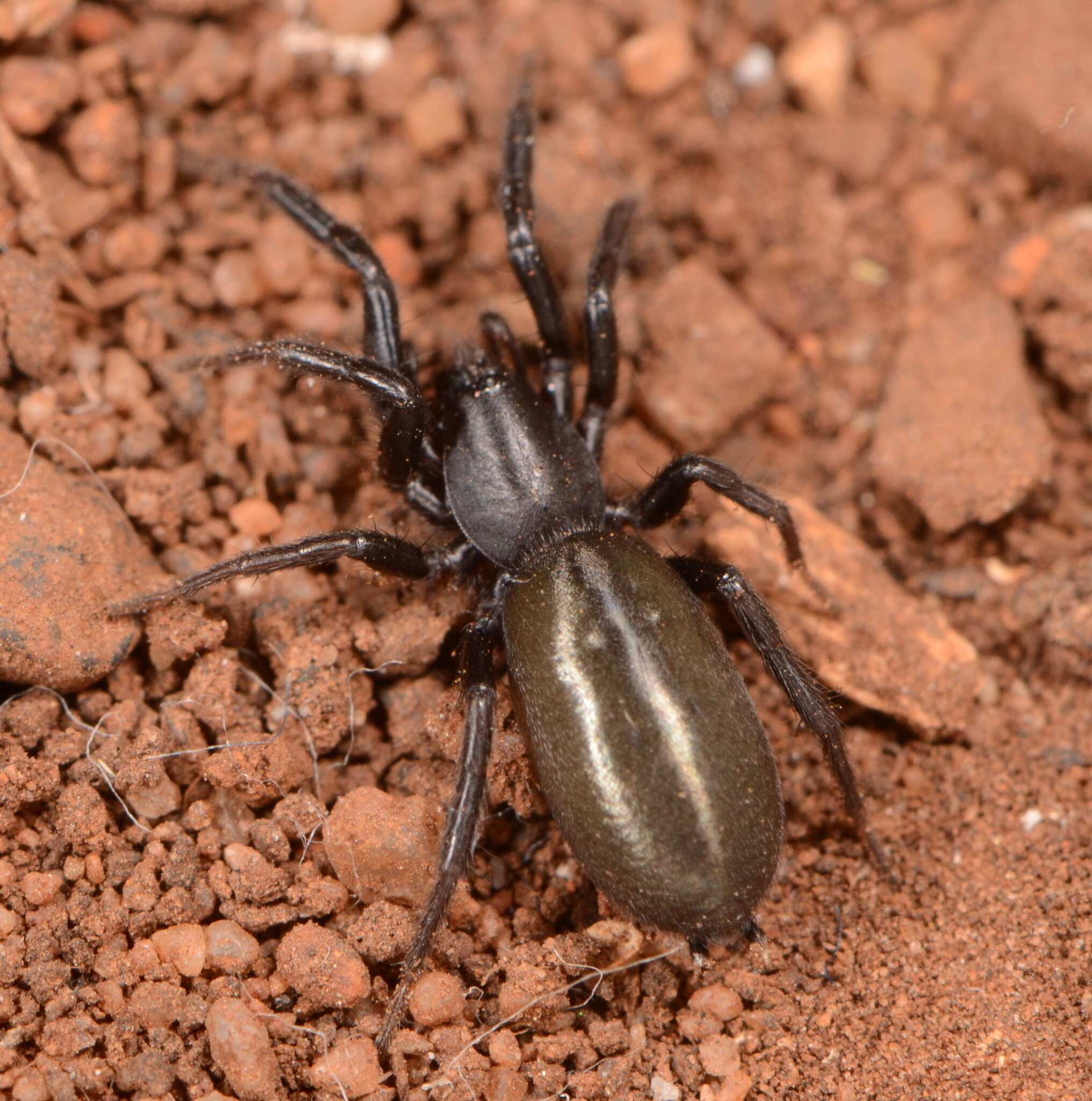
- Female
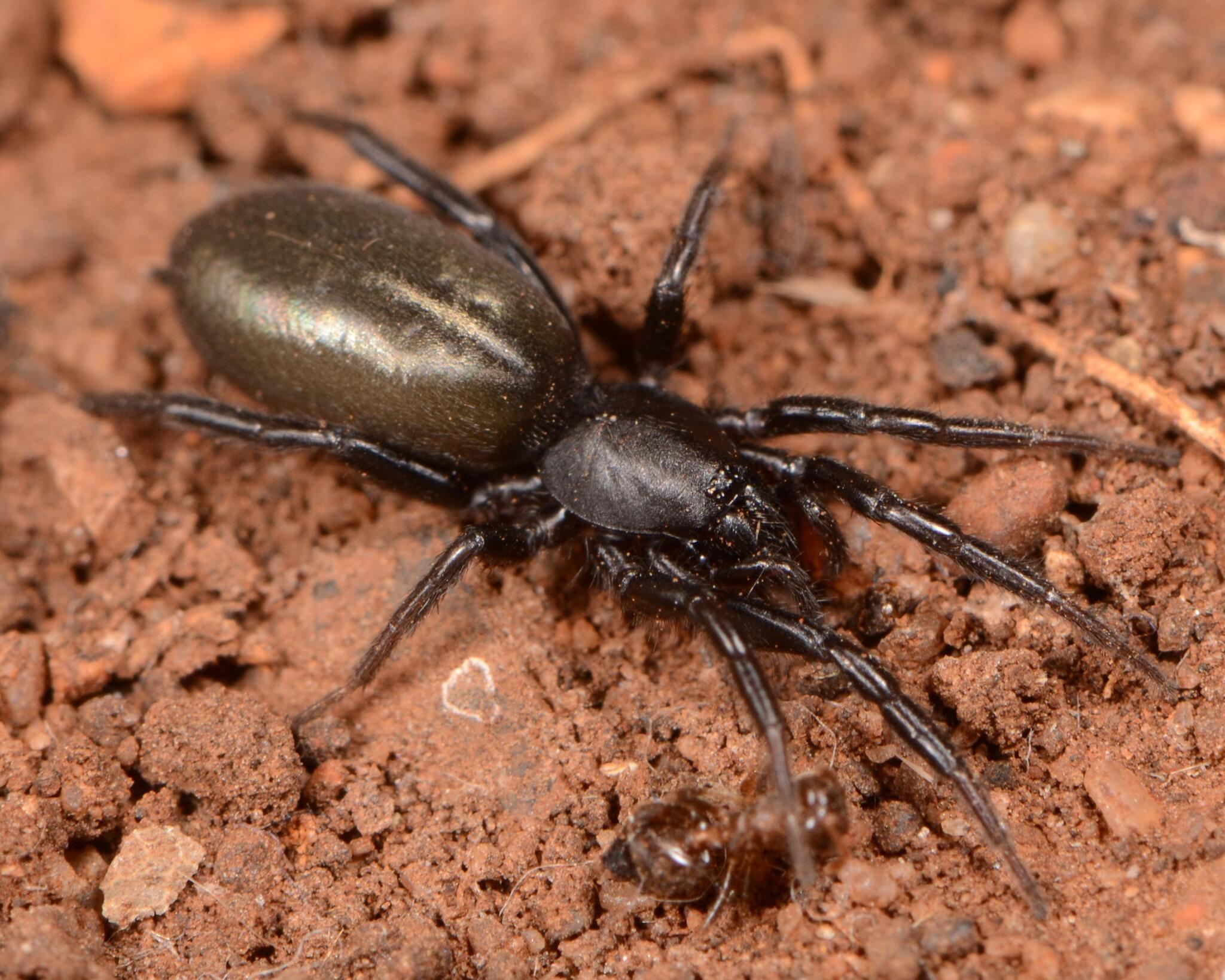
- Female

Scientific classification
- Kingdom: Animalia
- Phylum: Arthropoda
- Subphylum: Chelicerata
- Class: Arachnida
- Order: Araneae
- Infraorder: Araneomorphae
- Family: Gnaphosidae
- Genus: Zelotes
- Species: Z. pallidipes

Binomial name
- Zelotes pallidipes Tucker, 1923

= Zelotes pallidipes =

Species of spider

Zelotes pallidipes is a species of spider in the family Gnaphosidae. It is endemic to southern Africa.

== Distribution ==
Zelotes pallidipes occurs in Namibia and South Africa. In South Africa, the species has been recorded from four provinces: Free State, Limpopo, Mpumalanga, and KwaZulu-Natal.

== Habitat and ecology ==
The species inhabits the Grassland and Savanna biomes at altitudes ranging from 822 to 1,399 m above sea level. They are free-running ground spiders found under stones during the day. In Marble Hall, the species has also been sampled from cotton crops.

== Description ==
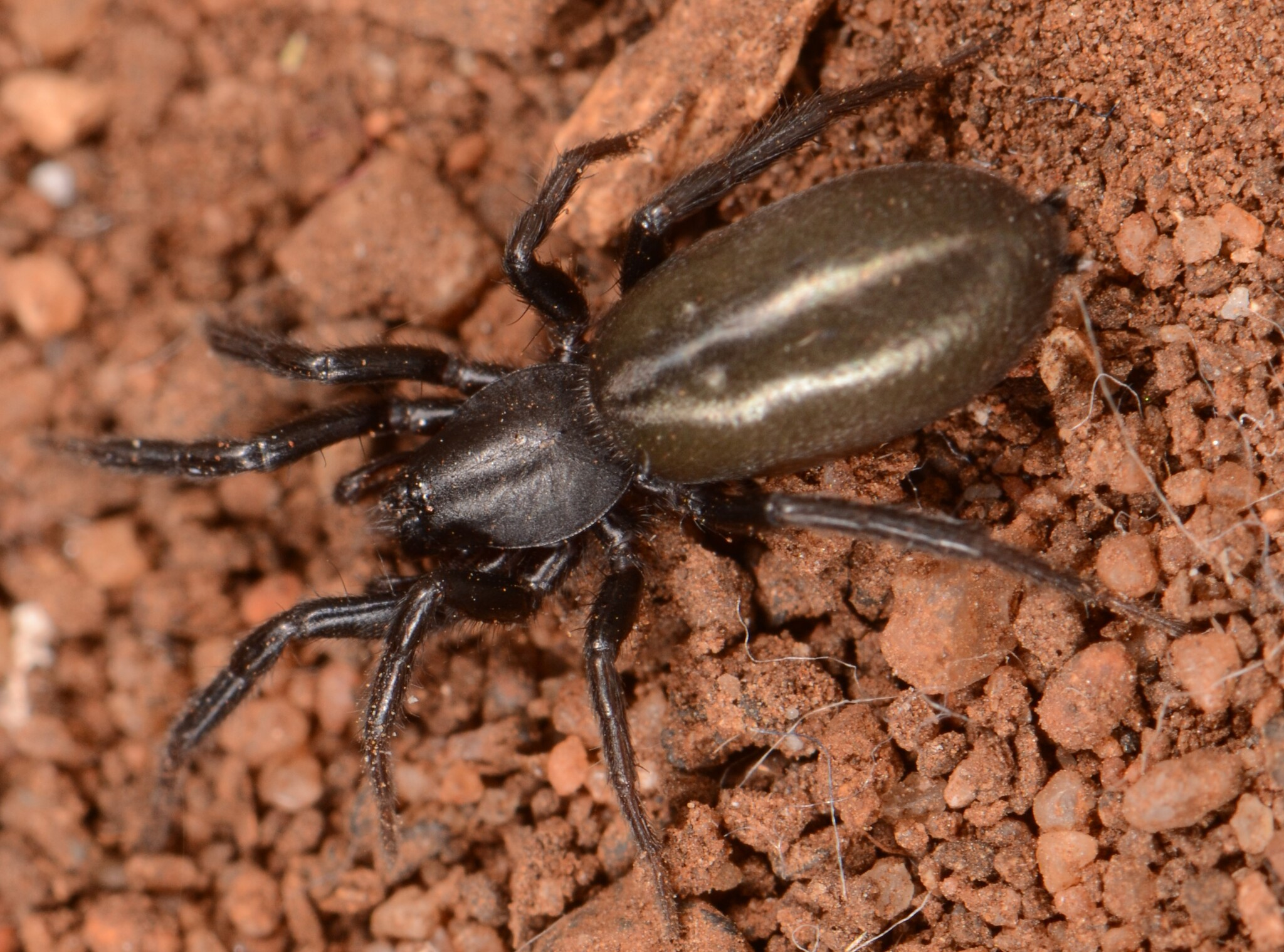
female

== Conservation ==
Zelotes pallidipes is listed as Least Concern by the South African National Biodiversity Institute due to its wide range. The species receives some protection in the Blouberg Nature Reserve. There are no significant threats to the species, though it is possibly under sampled.

== Taxonomy ==
The species was described by Tucker in 1923 from Namibia and was revised by Moira FitzPatrick in 2007. It is known from both sexes.
