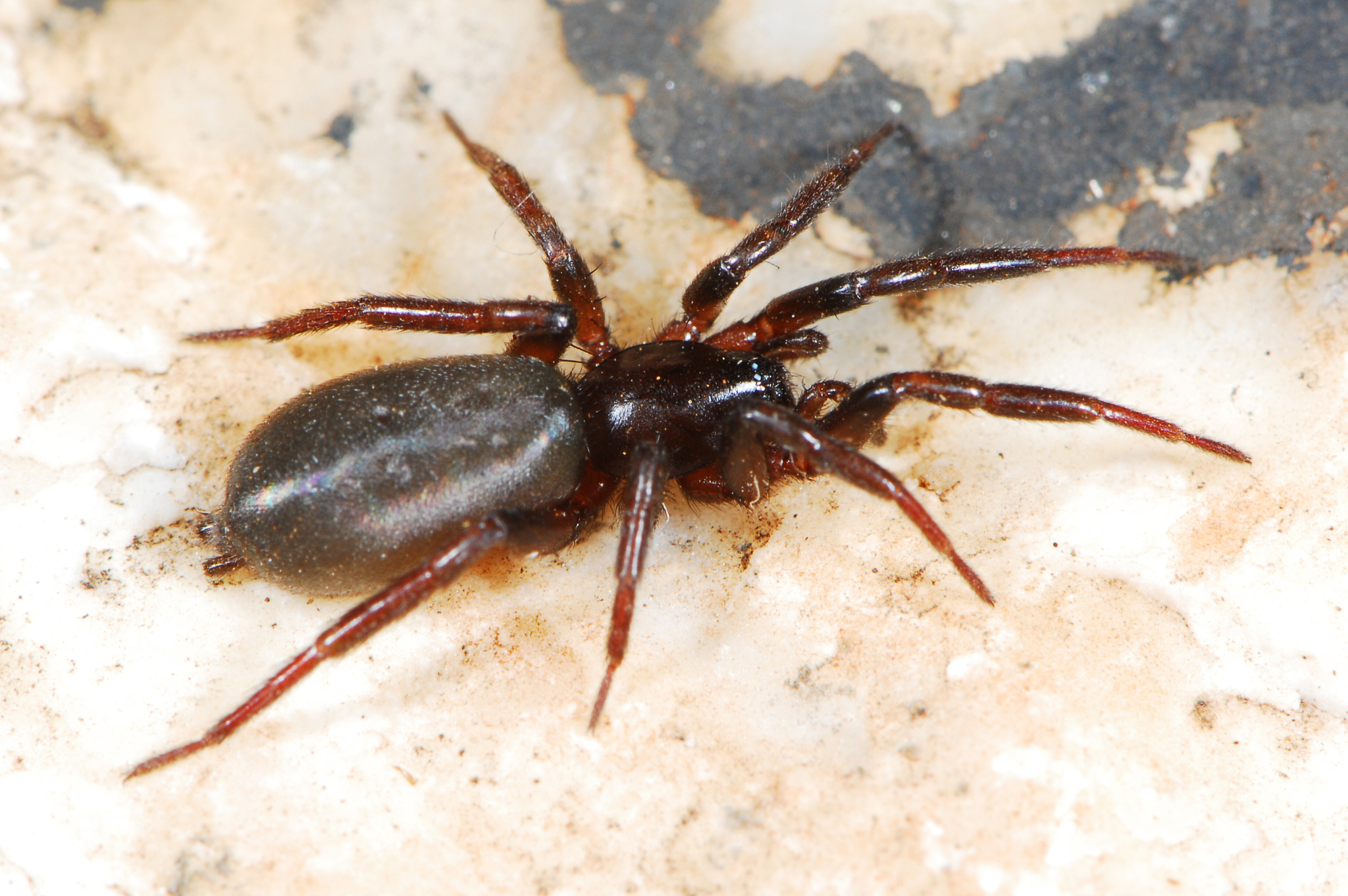
- Female
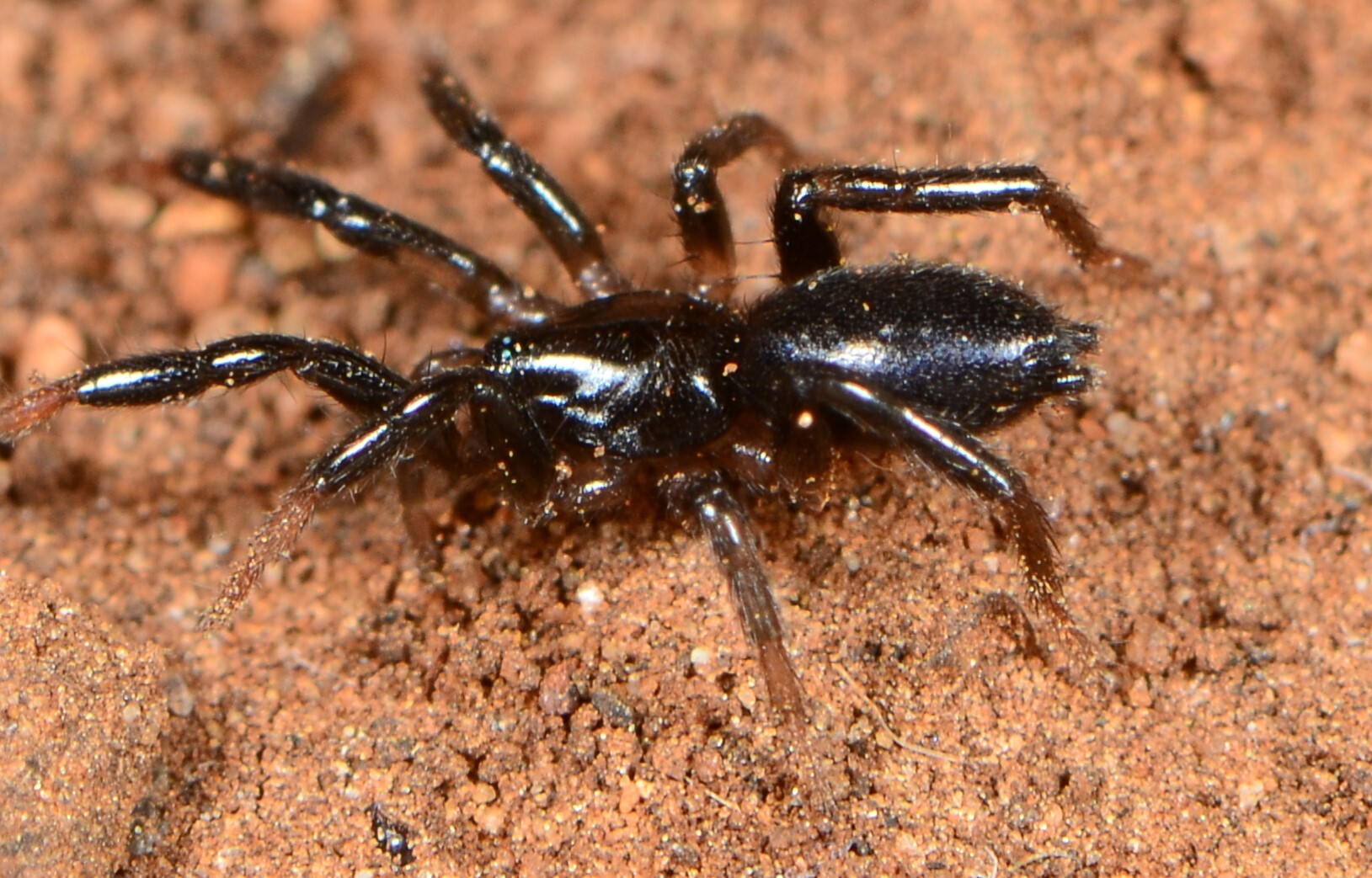
- Female

Scientific classification
- Kingdom: Animalia
- Phylum: Arthropoda
- Subphylum: Chelicerata
- Class: Arachnida
- Order: Araneae
- Infraorder: Araneomorphae
- Family: Gnaphosidae
- Genus: Zelotes
- Species: Z. frenchi

Binomial name
- Zelotes frenchi Tucker, 1923

= Zelotes frenchi =

French Dark Ground Spider

Species of spider

Zelotes frenchi is a species of spider in the family Gnaphosidae. It is commonly known as the French dark ground spider.

== Distribution ==
Zelotes frenchi is a southern African spider distributed across Botswana, Zimbabwe, and South Africa. In South Africa, it has been recorded from eight provinces, at altitudes ranging from 58 to 1,762 m above sea level.

== Habitat and ecology ==
The species inhabits the Fynbos, Grassland, and Savanna biomes. These are free-running ground spiders.

== Description ==
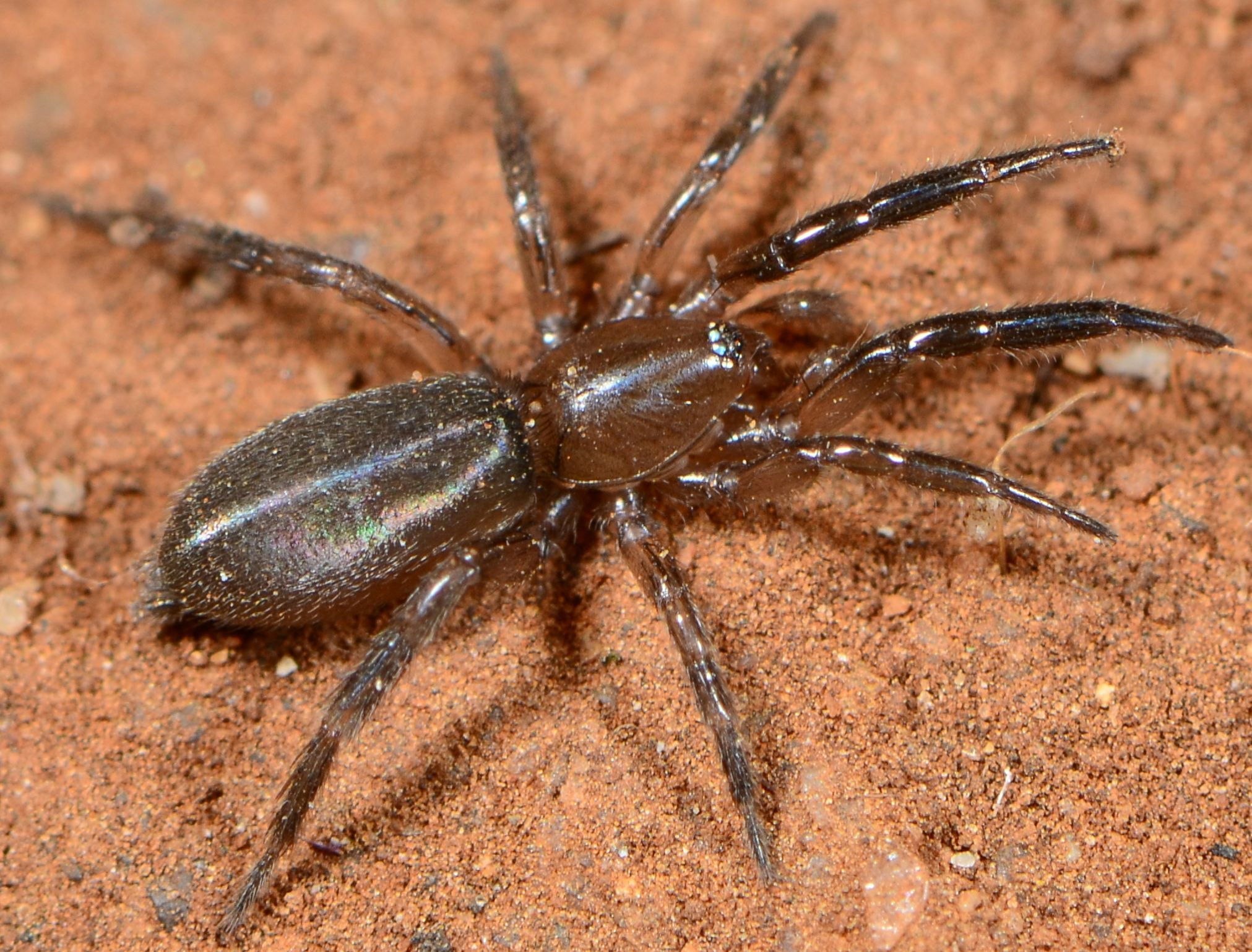
female

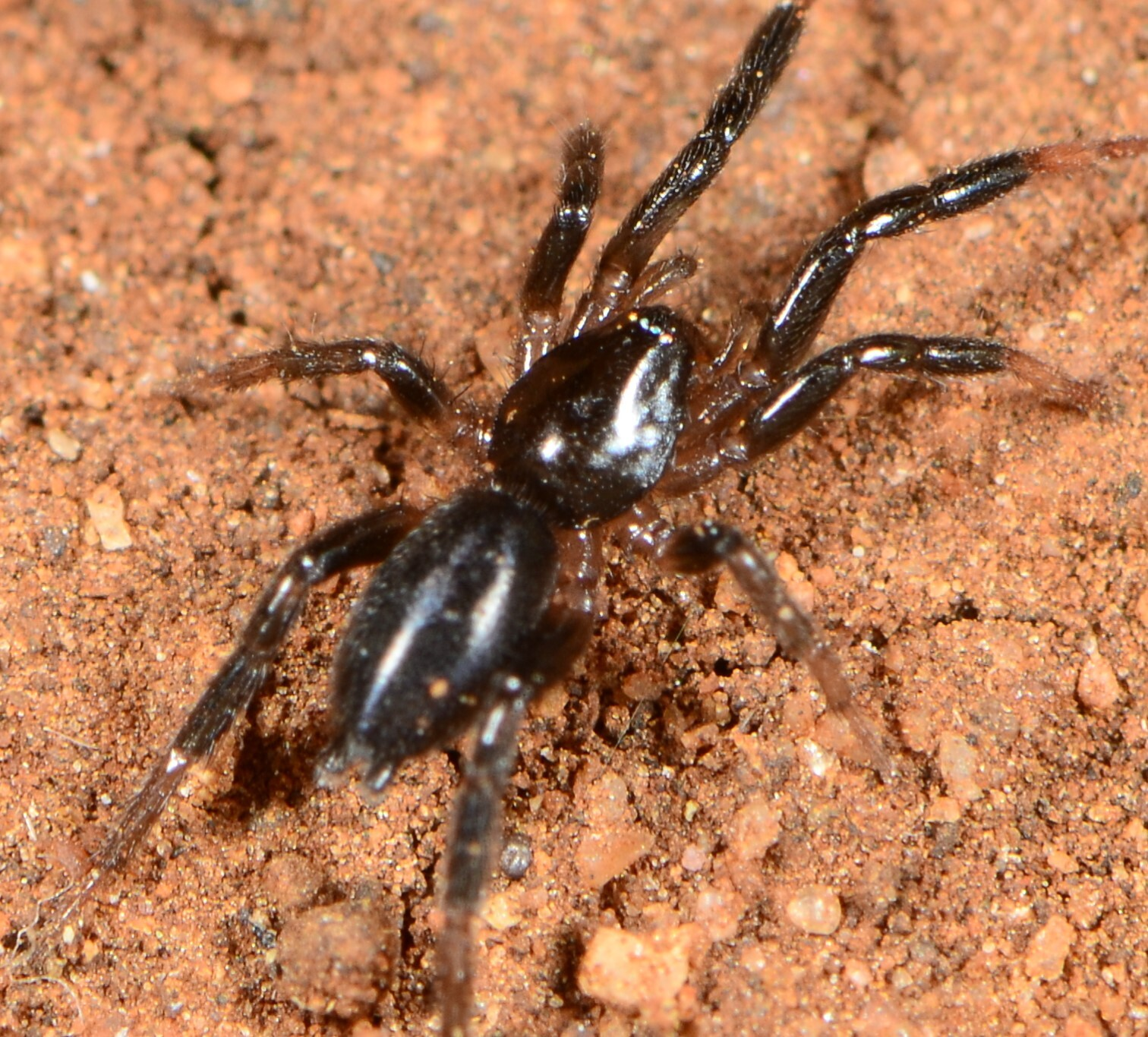
female

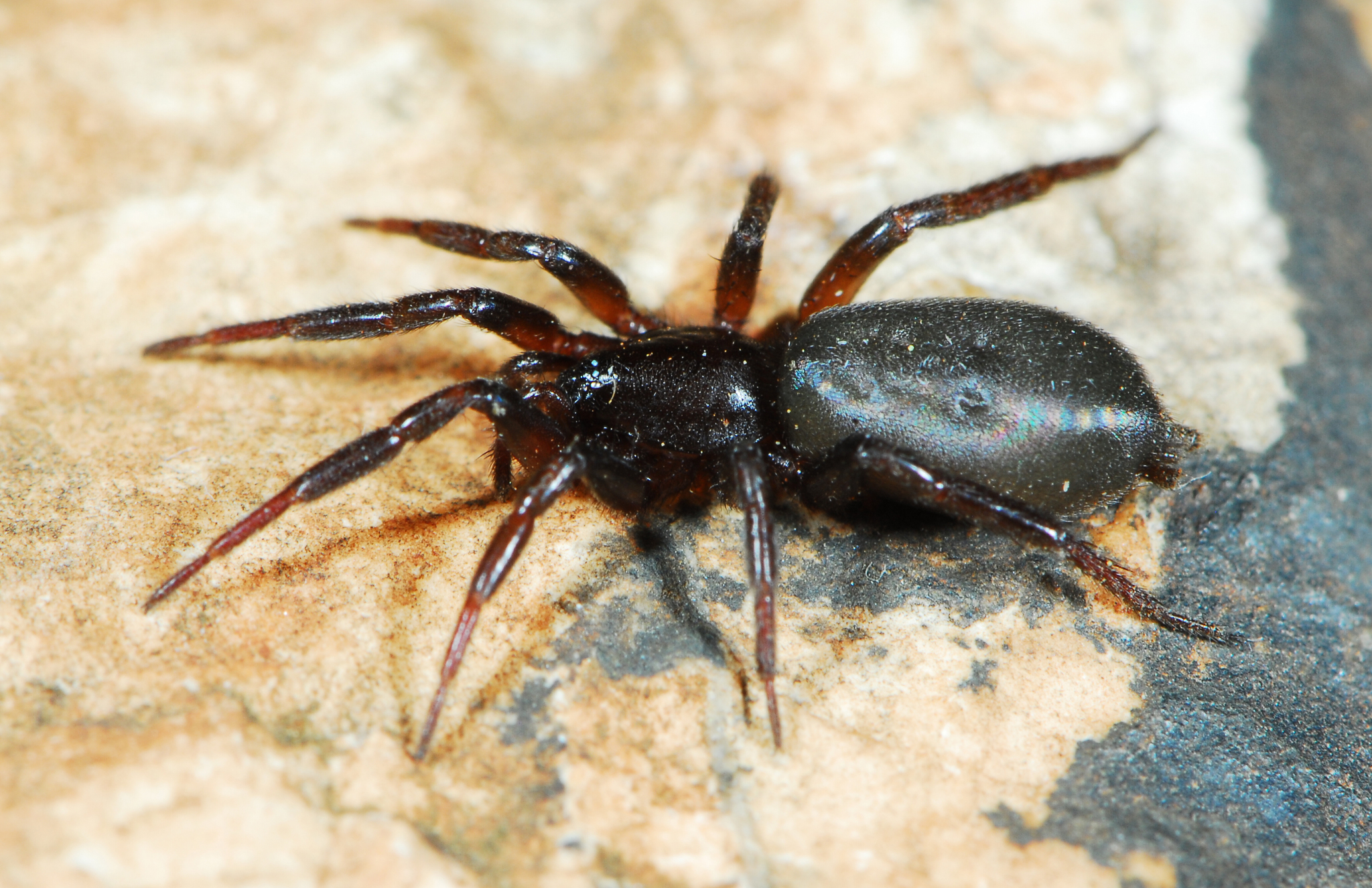
female

== Conservation ==
Zelotes frenchi is listed as Least Concern by the South African National Biodiversity Institute due to its wide geographic range. There are no significant threats to the species and it is protected in more than 10 protected areas.

== Taxonomy ==
The species was originally described by Tucker in 1923 from Zimbabwe. It was revised by FitzPatrick in 2007. The species is known from both sexes.
