= Zelotes ovambensis =

Ovambo Dark Ground Spider

Conservation status
- Least Concern (SANBI Red List)

Scientific classification
- Kingdom: Animalia
- Phylum: Arthropoda
- Subphylum: Chelicerata
- Class: Arachnida
- Order: Araneae
- Infraorder: Araneomorphae
- Family: Gnaphosidae
- Genus: Zelotes
- Species: Z. ovambensis

Binomial name
- Zelotes ovambensis Lawrence, 1927

Species of spider

Zelotes ovambensis is a species of spider in the family Gnaphosidae. It is commonly known as Ovambo dark ground spider and is endemic to southern Africa.

== Distribution ==
Zelotes ovambensis occurs in Namibia and South Africa. In South Africa, the species is known from only one locality in the Northern Cape at Tswalu Game Reserve.

== Habitat and ecology ==
The species inhabits the Savanna biome at an altitude of 1,128 m above sea level. Flat-bellied ground spiders are nocturnal hunters that make silk sacs under stones and surface debris where they live during the day, while moulting and during prolonged periods of inactivity.

== Conservation ==
Zelotes ovambensis is listed as Least Concern by the South African National Biodiversity Institute due to its wide range that includes Namibia. In South Africa, the species is protected in the Tswalu Game Reserve. There are no known threats to the species.

== Taxonomy ==
The species was described by Lawrence in 1927 from Namibia and was revised by FitzPatrick in 2007. It is known only from the female.
