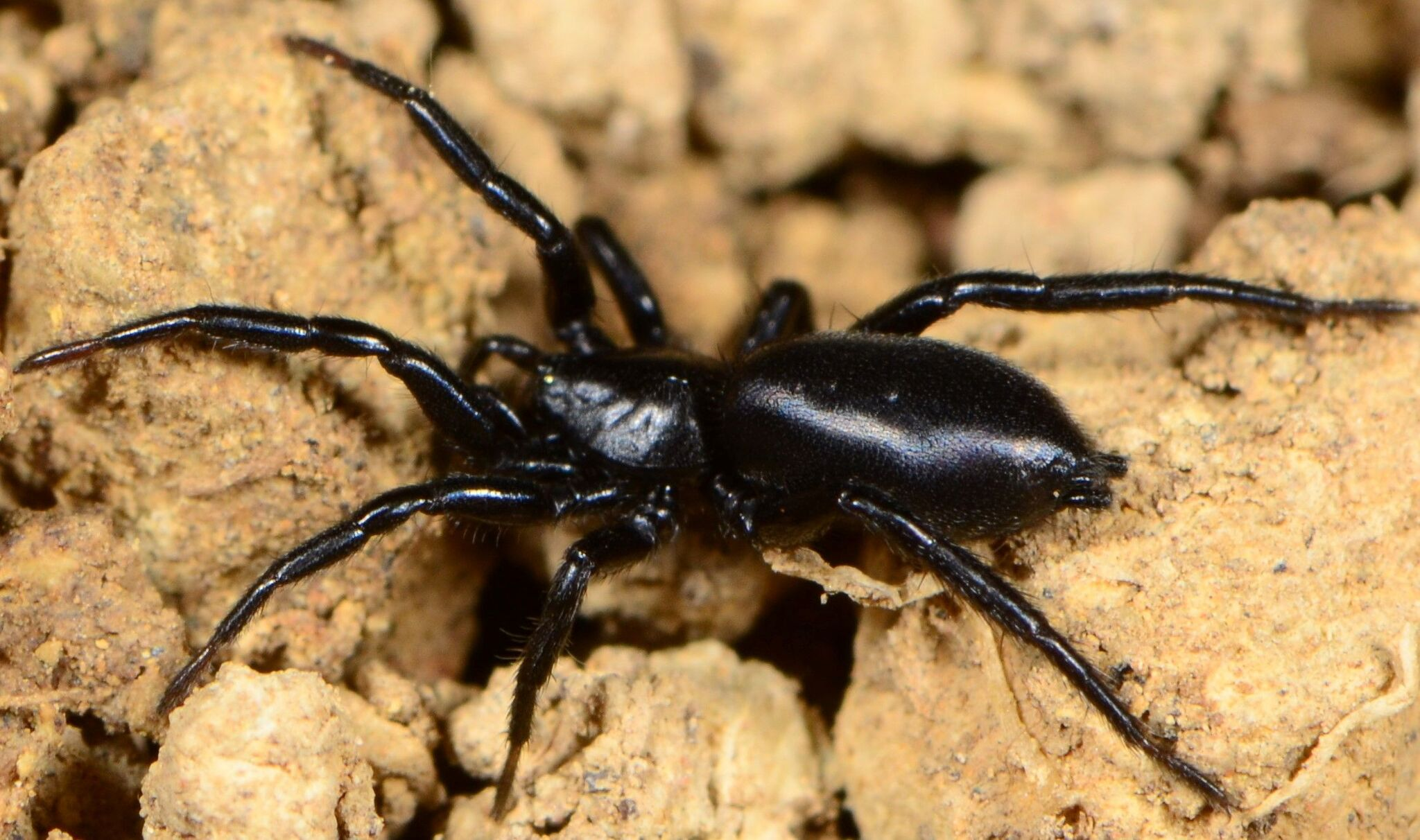
- Female
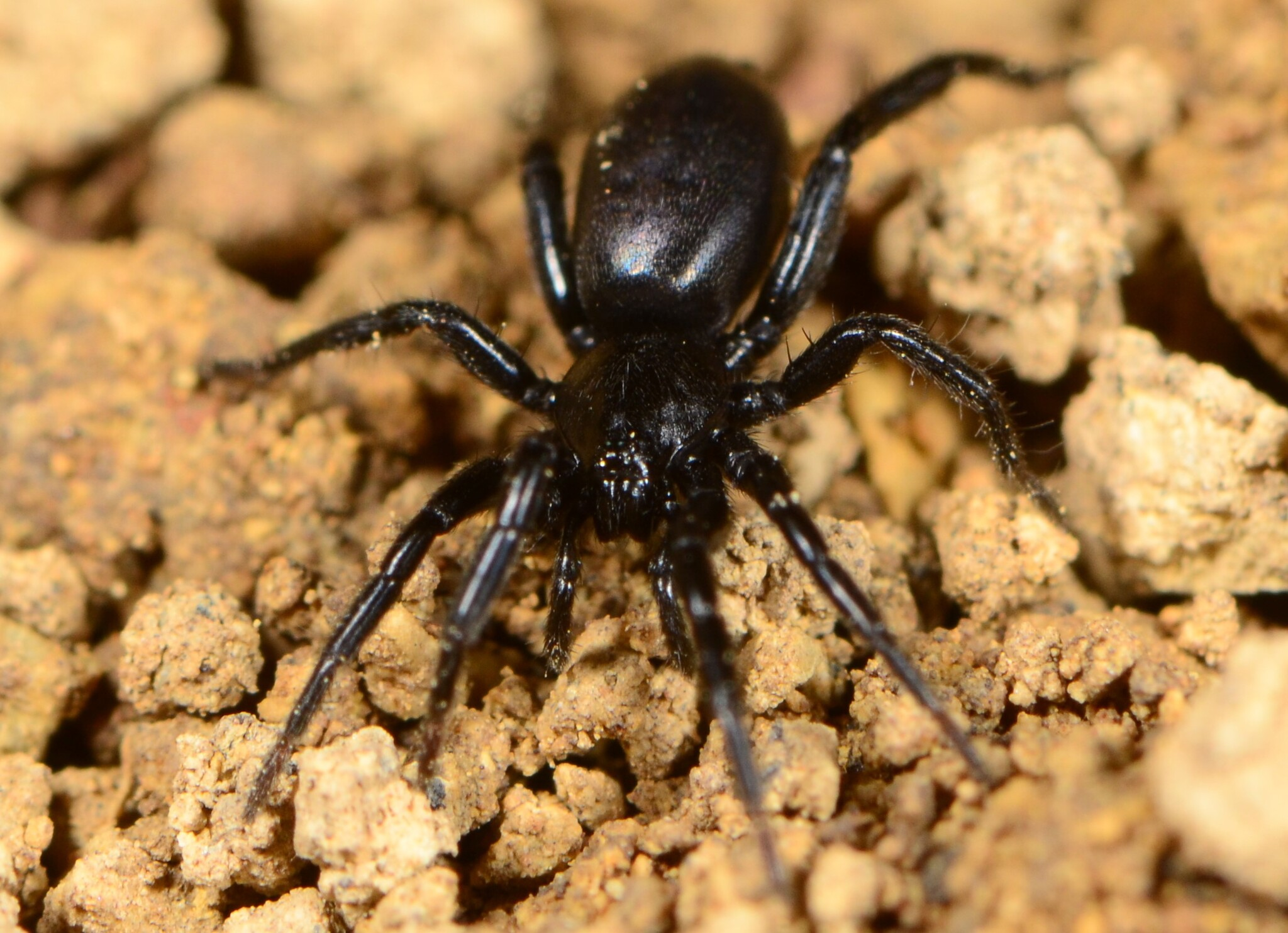
- Female

Scientific classification
- Kingdom: Animalia
- Phylum: Arthropoda
- Subphylum: Chelicerata
- Class: Arachnida
- Order: Araneae
- Infraorder: Araneomorphae
- Family: Gnaphosidae
- Genus: Zelotes
- Species: Z. qwabergensis

Binomial name
- Zelotes qwabergensis FitzPatrick, 2007

= Zelotes qwabergensis =

Harrismith Dark Ground Spider

Species of spider

Zelotes qwabergensis is a species of spider in the family Gnaphosidae. It is commonly known as Harrismith dark ground spider and is endemic to South Africa.

== Distribution ==
Zelotes qwabergensis is known from two provinces in South Africa, Free State (Harrismith) and KwaZulu-Natal (Wakefield Farm).

== Habitat and ecology ==
The species inhabits the Grassland biome at an altitude of 1,713 m above sea level. Flat-bellied ground spiders are nocturnal hunters that make silk sacs under stones and surface debris where they live during the day, while moulting and during prolonged periods of inactivity.

== Description ==
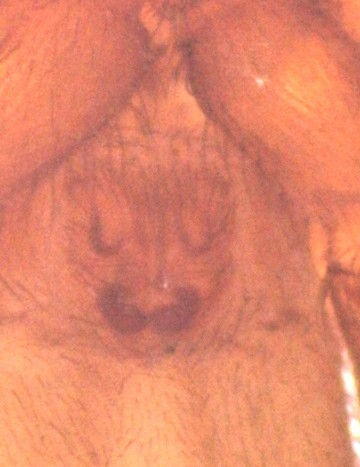
female

== Conservation ==
Zelotes qwabergensis is listed as Data Deficient for taxonomic reasons. More sampling is needed to collect the male and determine the species' range. There are no significant threats to the species.

== Taxonomy ==
The species was described by FitzPatrick in 2007. It is known only from the female.
