= Zelotes fratris =

Scientific classification
- Kingdom: Animalia
- Phylum: Arthropoda
- Subphylum: Chelicerata
- Class: Arachnida
- Order: Araneae
- Infraorder: Araneomorphae
- Family: Gnaphosidae
- Genus: Zelotes
- Species: Z. fratris

Binomial name
- Zelotes fratris Chamberlin, 1920

Species of spider

Zelotes fratris is a species of ground spider in the family Gnaphosidae. It is found in Russia (Siberia) and North America.
