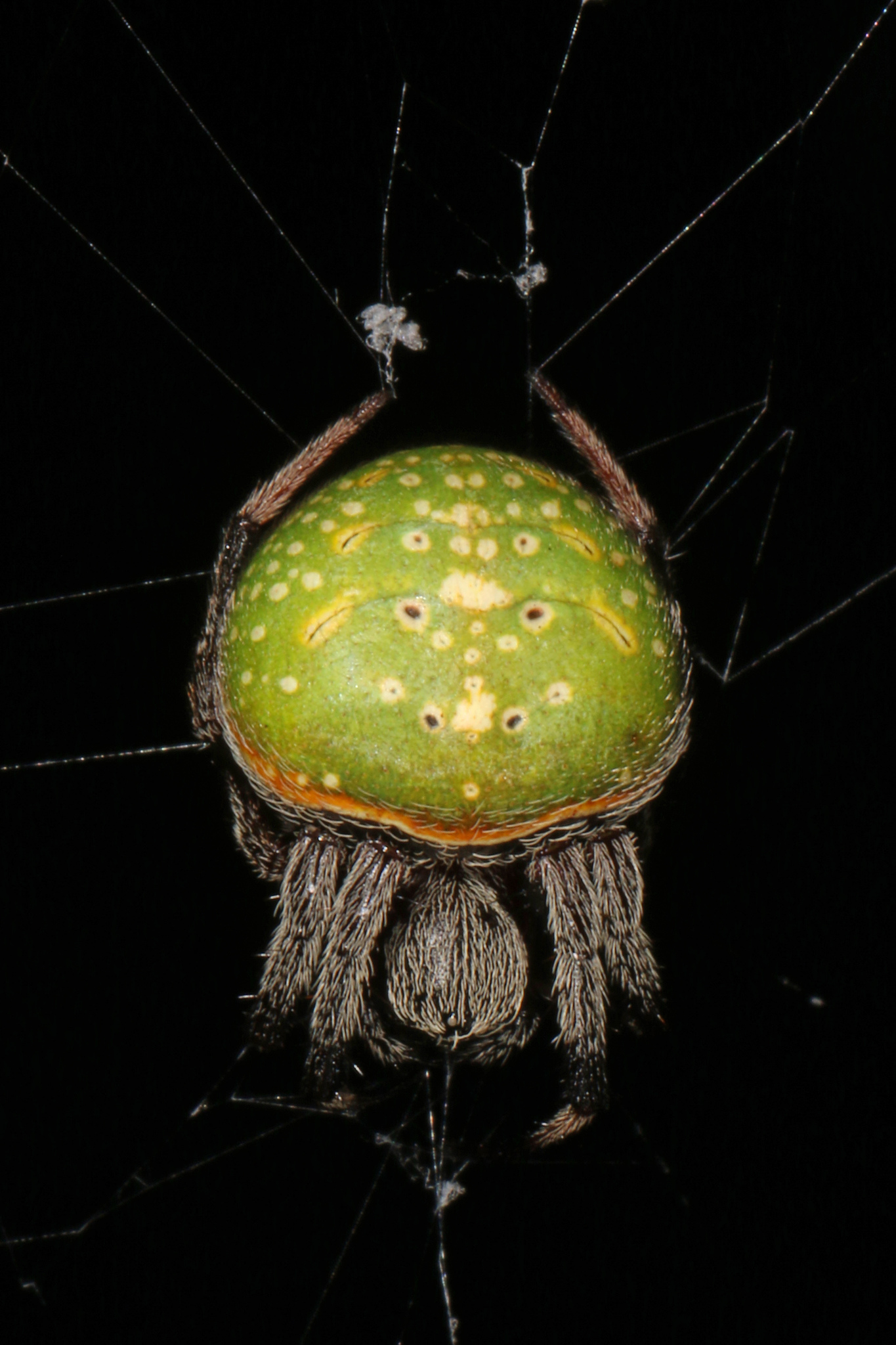
- Female from Zimbabwe

Conservation status
- Least Concern (SANBI Red List)

Scientific classification
- Kingdom: Animalia
- Phylum: Arthropoda
- Subphylum: Chelicerata
- Class: Arachnida
- Order: Araneae
- Infraorder: Araneomorphae
- Family: Araneidae
- Genus: Araneus
- Species: A. apricus

Binomial name
- Araneus apricus (Karsch, 1884)

= Araneus apricus =

Green Pea Spider

Species of spider

Araneus apricus is a species of spider in the family Araneidae. It is commonly known as the green pea spider.

== Distribution ==
Araneus apricus has a wide distribution across Africa, being recorded from São Tomé, Yemen, Socotra, Botswana, Namibia, Zimbabwe, Zambia, Eswatini, Tanzania, and South Africa. In South Africa, the species occurs in eight of the nine provinces at altitudes ranging from 7 to 1,556 m above sea level.

== Habitat and ecology ==
This species is commonly found in warmer tropical regions where they construct orb-webs with a retreat to one side. The species occurs in multiple biomes including Grassland, Savanna, Indian Ocean Coastal Belt, Fynbos, and Thicket biomes, with records from all South African floral biomes except the Succulent Karoo.

In South Africa, Araneus apricus has been collected from agricultural areas including avocado orchards, citrus and macadamia orchards, and tomato fields. The species is protected in more than 10 protected areas including Addo Elephant National Park, Kruger National Park, De Hoop Nature Reserve, and Polokwane Nature Reserve.

== Description ==
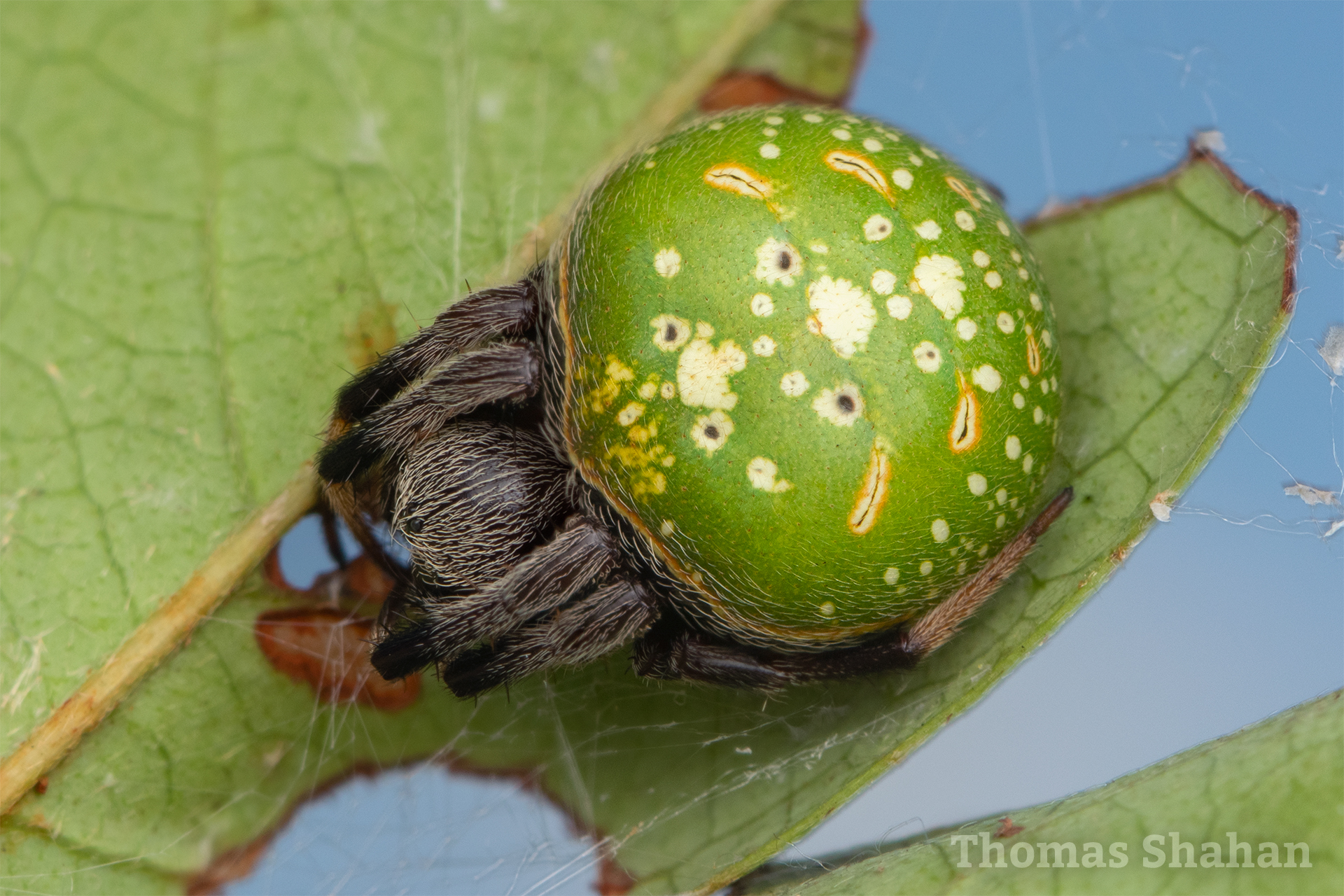
Female from Mozambique

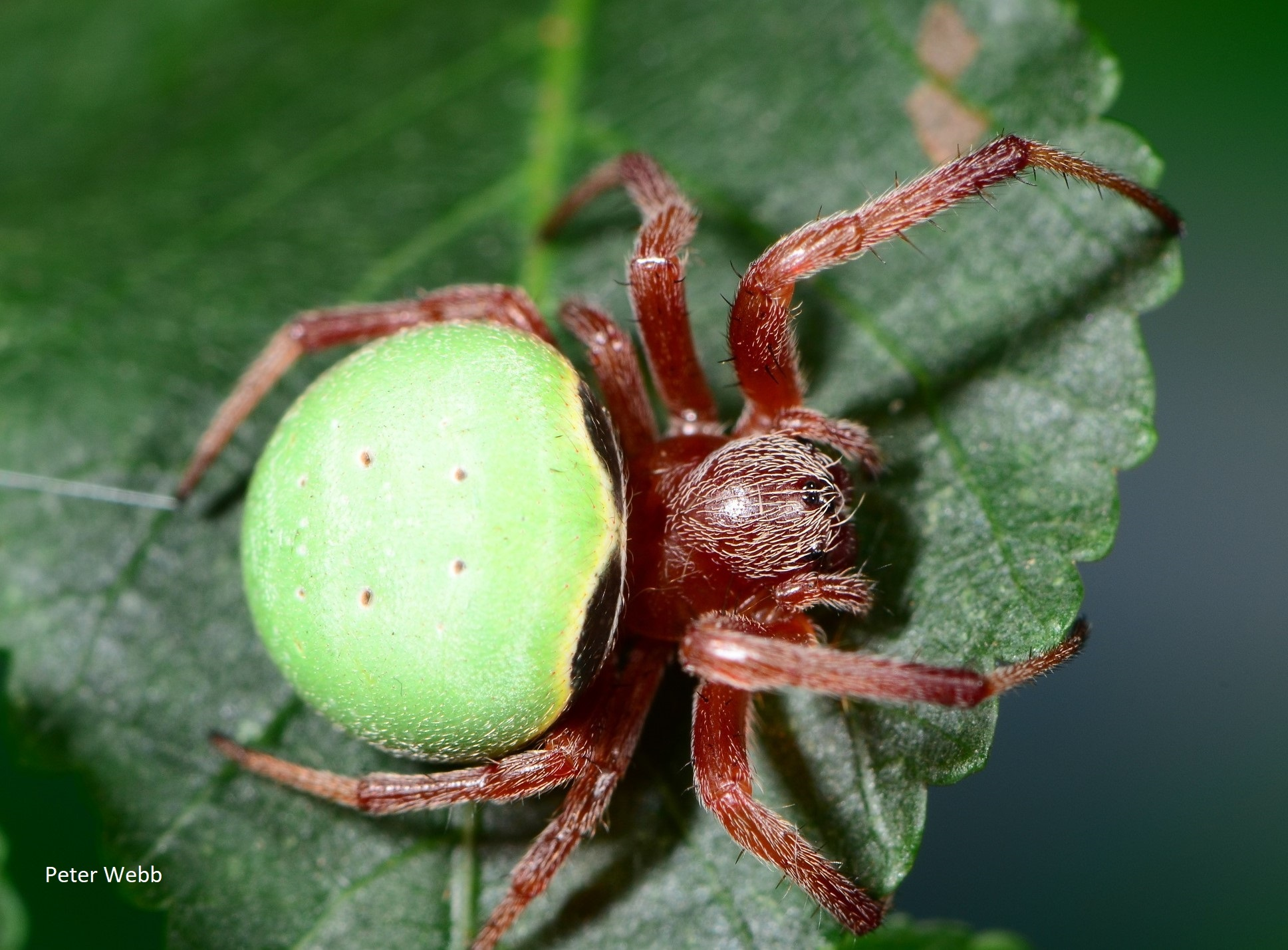
Female from South Africa

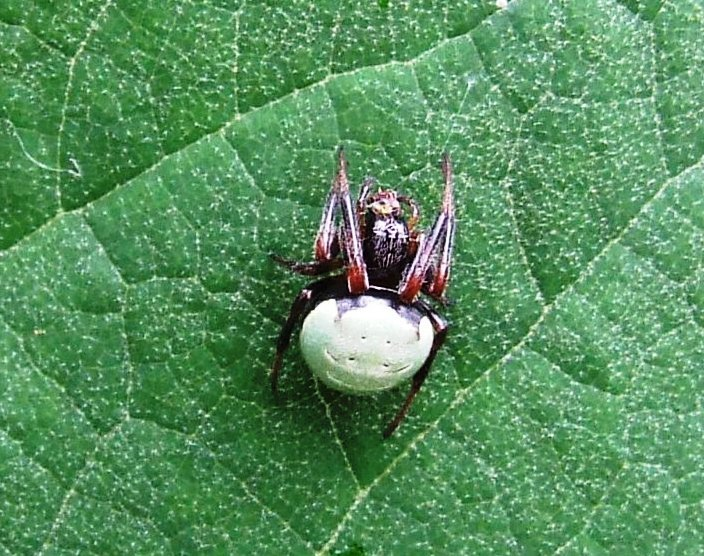
from Zimbabwe

== Conservation ==
Araneus apricus is listed as Least Concern by the South African National Biodiversity Institute due to its wide geographic range. The species is possibly under-collected and suspected to occur in countries between its known distribution points.

== Medical significance ==
Araneus apricus is one of the few araneid spiders for which a case study on bite symptoms exists, though no serious medical effects have been documented.

== Etymology ==
The species name apricus is derived from Latin meaning "sunny" or "delightful".

== Taxonomy ==
The species was originally described by Ferdinand Karsch in 1884 from São Tomé as Epeira aprica, based only on a female specimen.
