= De Hoop Marine Protected Area =

Marine conservation area on the coast of South Africa

- IUCN category Ia (strict nature reserve)
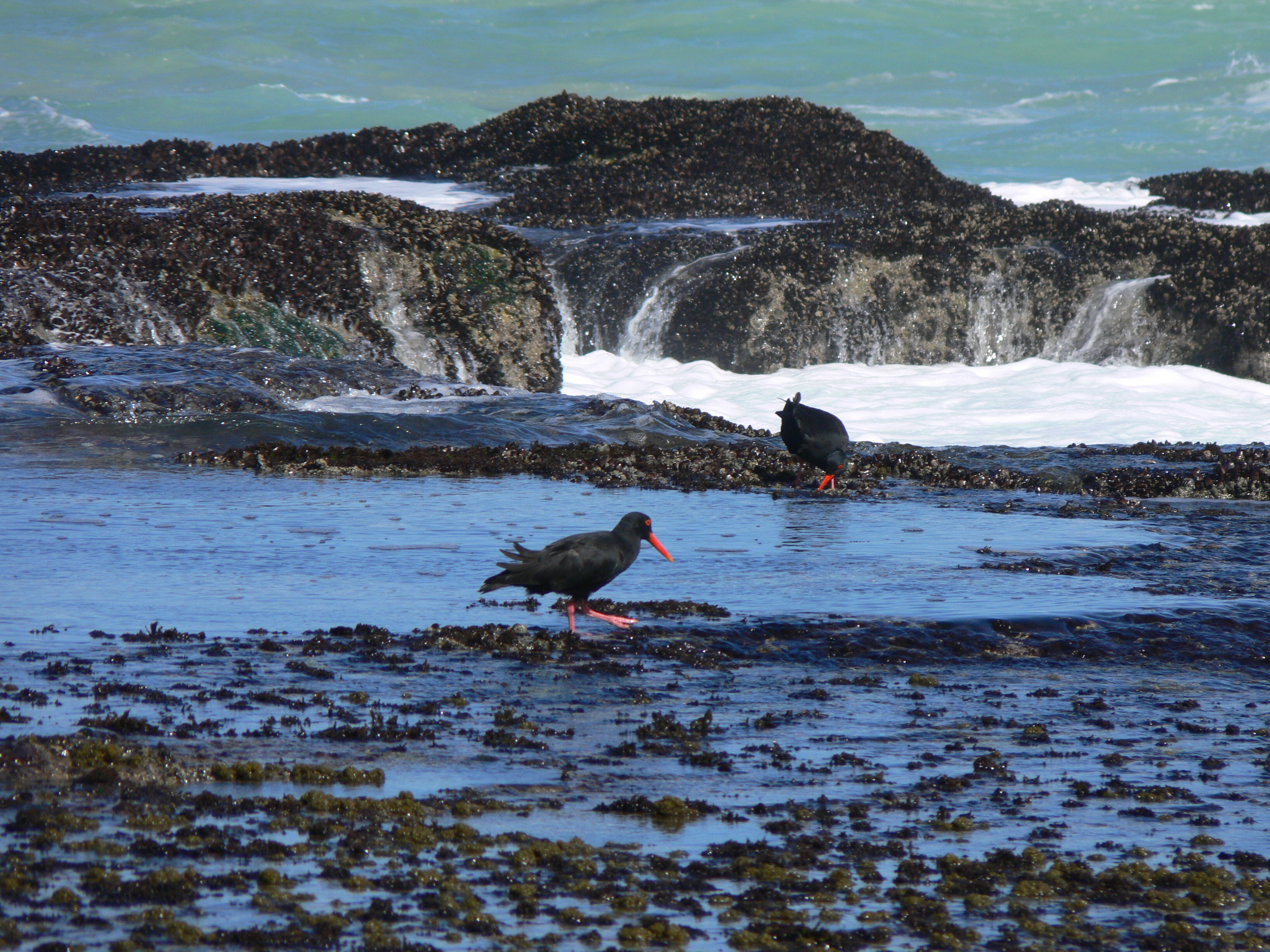
- African oystercatchers at De Hoop
- De Hoop MPA location
- Location: Western Cape, South Africa
- Nearest city: Arniston
- Coordinates: 34°30′S 20°45′E
- Area: 288.9 km^{2} (111.5 sq mi)
- Established: 2000
- De Hoop Marine Protected Area (South Africa)

The De Hoop Marine Protected Area lies between Arniston and the mouth of the Breede River on the south coast of South Africa adjacent to the De Hoop Nature Reserve. The MPA is 51 kilometres long, and extends 5 nautical miles to sea. The whole MPA is a restricted area (No Take zone) and is part of the migratory route and calving area for Southern right whales. The area protects habitats for several economically important inshore reef fish species, and ensures the retention of marine biomass in this part of the coast. The limestone coastline is includes archaeological sites and middens that date back centuries. The MPA is close to the Breede River estuary and, provides protection for species like cob (Argyrosomus spp.) that breed in the estuary and then return to the ocean.

== History ==
The MPA was proclaimed by the Minister of Environmental Affairs and Tourism, Mohammed Valli Moosa, in Government Gazette No. 21948 of 29 December 2000 in terms section 43 of the Marine Natural Resources Act, 18 of 1998. The area was previously established as a nature reserve in 1985.

== Purpose ==
A marine protected area is defined by the IUCN as "A clearly defined geographical space, recognised, dedicated and managed, through legal or other effective means, to achieve the long-term conservation of nature with associated ecosystem services and cultural values".

== Extent ==
The length of the protected shoreline is 51 km, and the area of protected ocean is 288.9 km^{2}

=== Zonation ===
The whole of De Hoop MPA is zoned as a restricted area (no-take zone).

=== Boundaries ===
- The northern boundary is the high water mark
- The eastern boundary is a line at 114° true bearing from a beacon near Stilbaai Point at S34°27.13'; E020°052.25'
- The western boundary is a line at 150° true bearing from a beacon between Rys Point and Skipskop at S34°34.94'; E020°21.89'
- The seaward (southern) boundary is a series of straight lines joining the following points in sequence, which are all approximately three nautical miles from the shore:
  - S34°28.378'; E020°55.653'
  - S34°28.385'; E020°55.397'
  - S34°30.378'; E020°53.904'
  - S34°31.295'; E020°51.277'
  - S34°31.088'; E020°48.865'
  - S34°30.416'; E020°45.593'
  - S34°29.850'; E020°41.128'
  - S34°30.438'; E020°34.900'
  - S34°32.329'; E020°29.699'
  - S34°37.600'; E020°23.757'

==== Restricted areas ====
The whole MPA is a restricted area.

== Management ==
The marine protected areas of South Africa are the responsibility of the national government, which has management agreements with a variety of MPA management authorities, in this case, the MPA is adjacent to the De Hoop Nature Reserve and is managed by CapeNature with funding from the SA Government through the Department of Environmental Affairs (DEA).

The Department of Agriculture, Forestry and Fisheries is responsible for issuing permits, quotas and law enforcement.

== Geography ==
=== Climate of the South-western Cape ===
The climate of the South-western Cape is markedly different from the rest of South Africa, which is a summer rainfall region, receiving most of its rainfall during the summer months of December to February. The South-western Cape has a Mediterranean type climate, with most of its rainfall during the winter months from June to September.

During the summer the dominant factor determining the weather in the region is a high pressure zone, known as the South Atlantic High, located over the South Atlantic ocean to the west of the Cape coast. Winds circulating in an anticlockwise direction from such a system reach the Cape from the south-east, producing periods of up to several days of high winds and mostly clear skies. These winds keep the region relatively cool. Because of its south facing aspect De Hoop is exposed to these winds.

Winter in the South-western Cape is characterised by disturbances in the circumpolar westerly winds, resulting in a series of eastward moving depressions. These bring cool cloudy weather and rain from the north west. The south westerly winds over the South Atlantic produce the prevailing south-westerly swell typical of the winter months, which beat on the exposed coastline.

== Ecology ==
Marine ecoregions of the South African Exclusive Economic Zone: De Hoop Marine Protected Area is in the Agulhas ecoregion

The MPA is in the warm temperate Agulhas ecoregion to the east of Cape Point which extends eastwards to the Mbashe River. There are a large proportion of species endemic to South Africa along this coastline.

Four major habitats exist in the sea in this region, distinguished by the nature of the substrate. The substrate, or base material, is important in that it provides a base to which an organism can anchor itself, which is vitally important for those organisms which need to stay in one particular kind of place. Rocky shores and reefs provide a firm fixed substrate for the attachment of plants and animals. Some of these may have Kelp forests, which reduce the effect of waves and provide food and shelter for an extended range of organisms. Sandy beaches and bottoms are a relatively unstable substrate and cannot anchor kelp or many of the other benthic organisms. Finally there is open water, above the substrate and clear of the kelp forest, where the organisms must drift or swim. Mixed habitats are also frequently found, which are a combination of those mentioned above. There are no significant estuarine habitats in the MPA.

Rocky shores and reefs There are rocky reefs and mixed rocky and sandy bottoms. For many marine organisms the substrate is another type of marine organism, and it is common for several layers to co-exist. Examples of this are red bait pods, which are usually encrusted with sponges, ascidians, bryozoans, anemones, and gastropods, and abalone, which are usually covered by similar seaweeds to those found on the surrounding rocks, usually with a variety of other organisms living on the seaweeds.

The type of rock of the reef is of some importance, as it influences the range of possibilities for the local topography, which in turn influences the range of habitats provided, and therefore the diversity of inhabitants. Sandstone and other sedimentary rocks erode and weather very differently, and depending on the direction of dip and strike, and steepness of the dip, may produce reefs which are relatively flat to very high profile and full of small crevices. These features may be at varying angles to the shoreline and wave fronts. There are fewer large holes, tunnels and crevices in sandstone reefs, but often many deep but low near-horizontal crevices.

Kelp forests Kelp forests are a variation of rocky reefs, as the kelp requires a fairly strong and stable substrate which can withstand the loads of repeated waves dragging on the kelp plants. The Sea bamboo Ecklonia maxima grows in water which is shallow enough to allow it to reach to the surface with its gas-filled stipes, so that the fronds form a dense layer at or just below the surface, depending on the tide. The shorter Split-fan kelp Laminaria pallida grows mostly on deeper reefs, where there is not so much competition from the sea bamboo. Both these kelp species provide food and shelter for a variety of other organisms, particularly the Sea bamboo, which is a base for a wide range of epiphytes, which in turn provide food and shelter for more organisms.

Sandy beaches and bottoms (including shelly, pebble and gravel bottoms) Sandy bottoms at first glance appear to be fairly barren areas, as they lack the stability to support many of the spectacular reef based species, and the variety of large organisms is relatively low. The sand is continually being moved around by wave action, to a greater or lesser degree depending on weather conditions and exposure of the area. This means that sessile organisms must be specifically adapted to areas of relatively loose substrate to thrive in them, and the variety of species found on a sandy or gravel bottom will depend on all these factors. Sandy bottoms have one important compensation for their instability, animals can burrow into the sand and move up and down within its layers, which can provide feeding opportunities and protection from predation. Other species can dig themselves holes in which to shelter, or may feed by filtering water drawn through the tunnel, or by extending body parts adapted to this function into the water above the sand.

The open sea

=== Marine species diversity ===
==== Animals ====
The MPA provides a protected habitat for economically important territorial reef fish, particularly galjoen, blacktail (Diplodus capensis), black musselcracker, white musselcracker and wildeperd (Diplodus hottentotus).

==== Endemism ====
The MPA is in the warm temperate Agulhas ecoregion to the east of Cape Point which extends eastwards to the Mbashe River. There are a large proportion of species endemic to South Africa along this coastline.

== See also ==
Marine protected areas of South Africa
- List of protected areas of South Africa
- Marine protected areas of South Africa – Protected areas of coastline or ocean in the EEZ of South Africa
