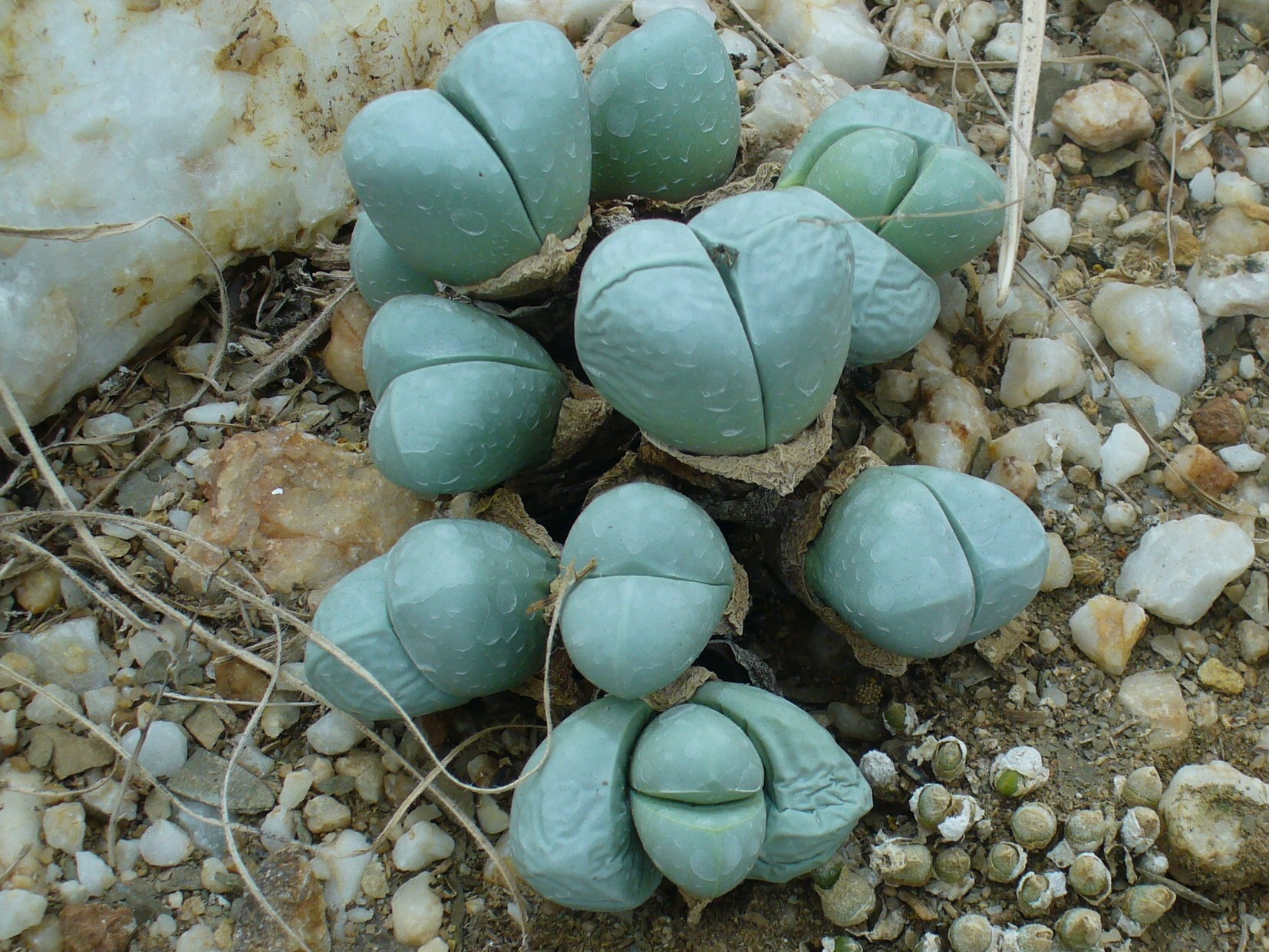
- Oophytum nanum

Scientific classification
- Kingdom: Plantae
- Clade: Tracheophytes
- Clade: Angiosperms
- Clade: Eudicots
- Order: Caryophyllales
- Family: Aizoaceae
- Subfamily: Ruschioideae
- Tribe: Ruschieae
- Genus: Oophytum; N.E.Br.

= Oophytum =

Genus of succulents

Oophytum is a genus of succulent plants native to the Cape Provinces of South Africa. Both species are endemic to the Knersvlakte. Egg-shaped Oophytum plants develop two leaves opposite each other per season. At the end of winter the outer pair forms a sheath from which the new pair of leaves develop. Water cells are visible on the soft leaves giving them a shimmering appearance. The flowers, produced in winter, are white, pink, or a combination of both.

The genus contains two accepted species:

- Oophytum nanum (Schltr.) L.Bolus
- Oophytum oviforme (N.E.Br.) N.E.Br.
