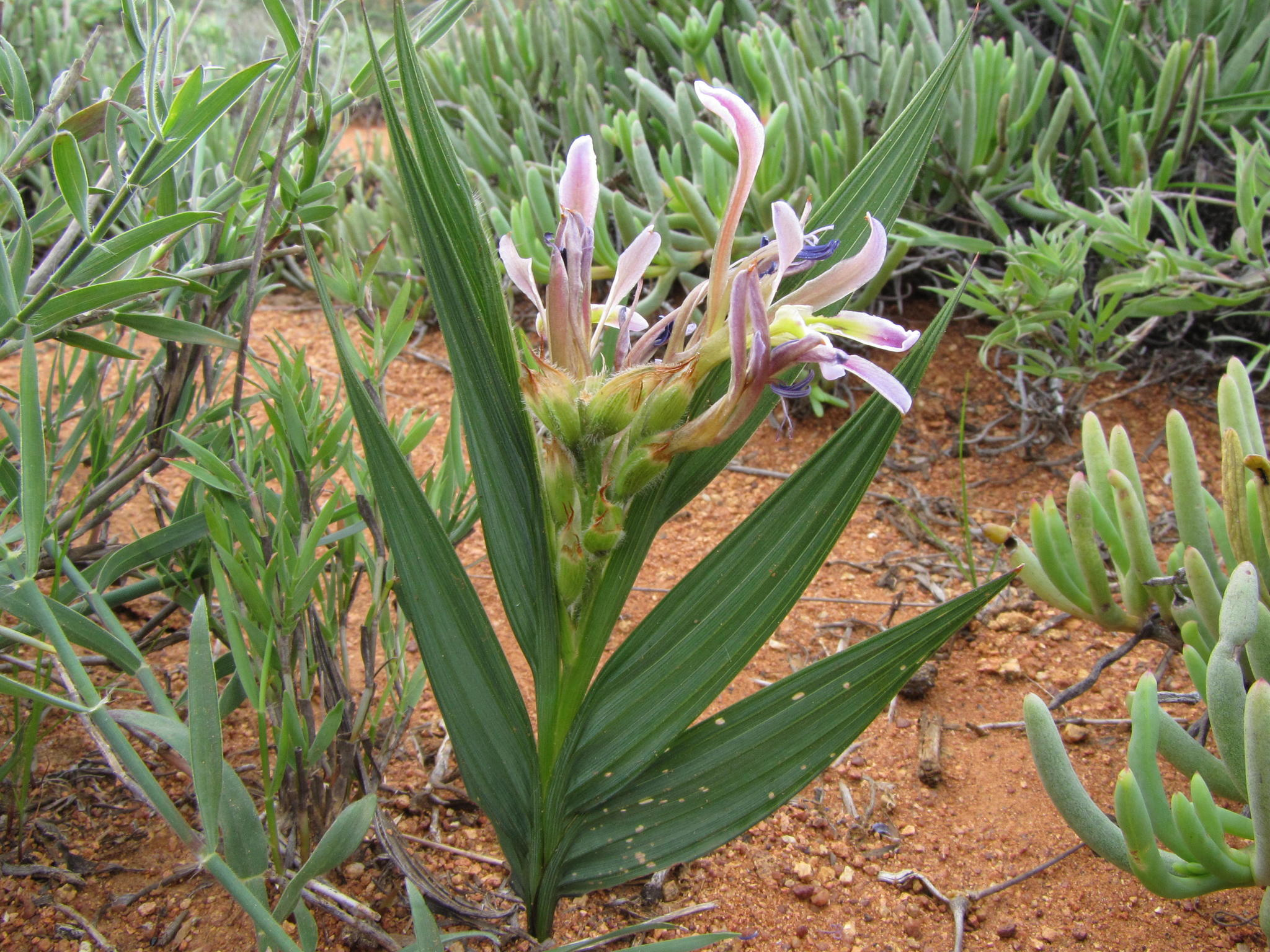

Scientific classification
- Kingdom: Plantae
- Clade: Tracheophytes
- Clade: Angiosperms
- Clade: Monocots
- Order: Asparagales
- Family: Iridaceae
- Genus: Babiana
- Species: B. lewisiana

Binomial name
- Babiana lewisiana B.Nord.

= Babiana lewisiana =

Species of flowering plant

Babiana lewisiana is a perennial flowering plant and geophyte belonging to the genus Babiana. The species is endemic to the Western Cape and occurs on the Knersvlakte in the vygieveld and heuweltjiesveld. There are two subpopulations that are threatened by mining activities and crop cultivation.
