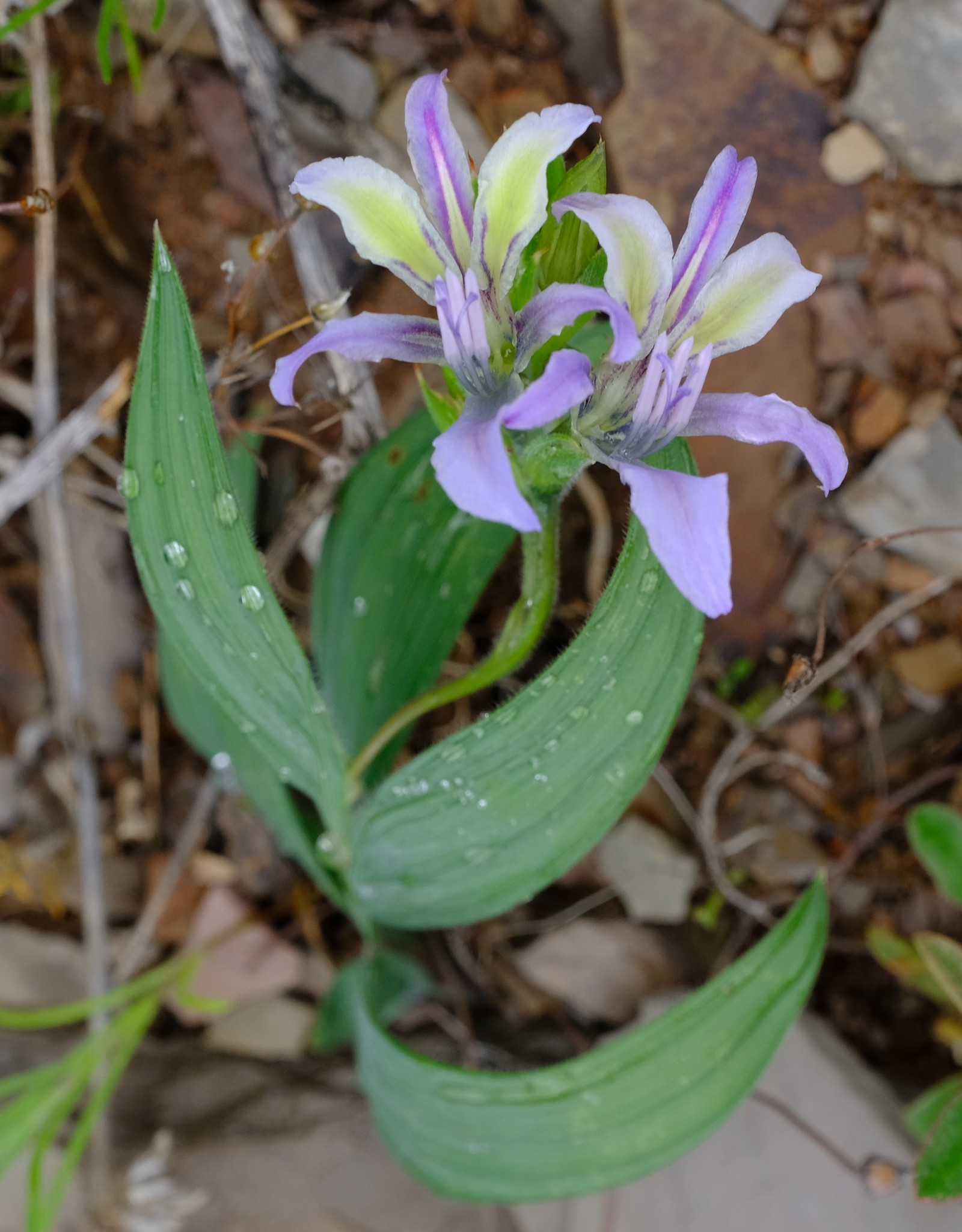

Conservation status
- Vulnerable (IUCN 3.1)

Scientific classification
- Kingdom: Plantae
- Clade: Tracheophytes
- Clade: Angiosperms
- Clade: Monocots
- Order: Asparagales
- Family: Iridaceae
- Genus: Babiana
- Species: B. salteri

Binomial name
- Babiana salteri G.J.Lewis

= Babiana salteri =

Species of flowering plant

Babiana salteri is a perennial flowering plant and geophyte belonging to the genus Babiana. The species is endemic to the Western Cape. It occurs on the Knersvlakte between Vanrhynsdorp and the Van Rhyn's Pass. It is part of the vygieveld vegetation. The plant has a range of 500 km² and there are four subpopulations that are threatened by overgrazing and gypsum mining activities.
