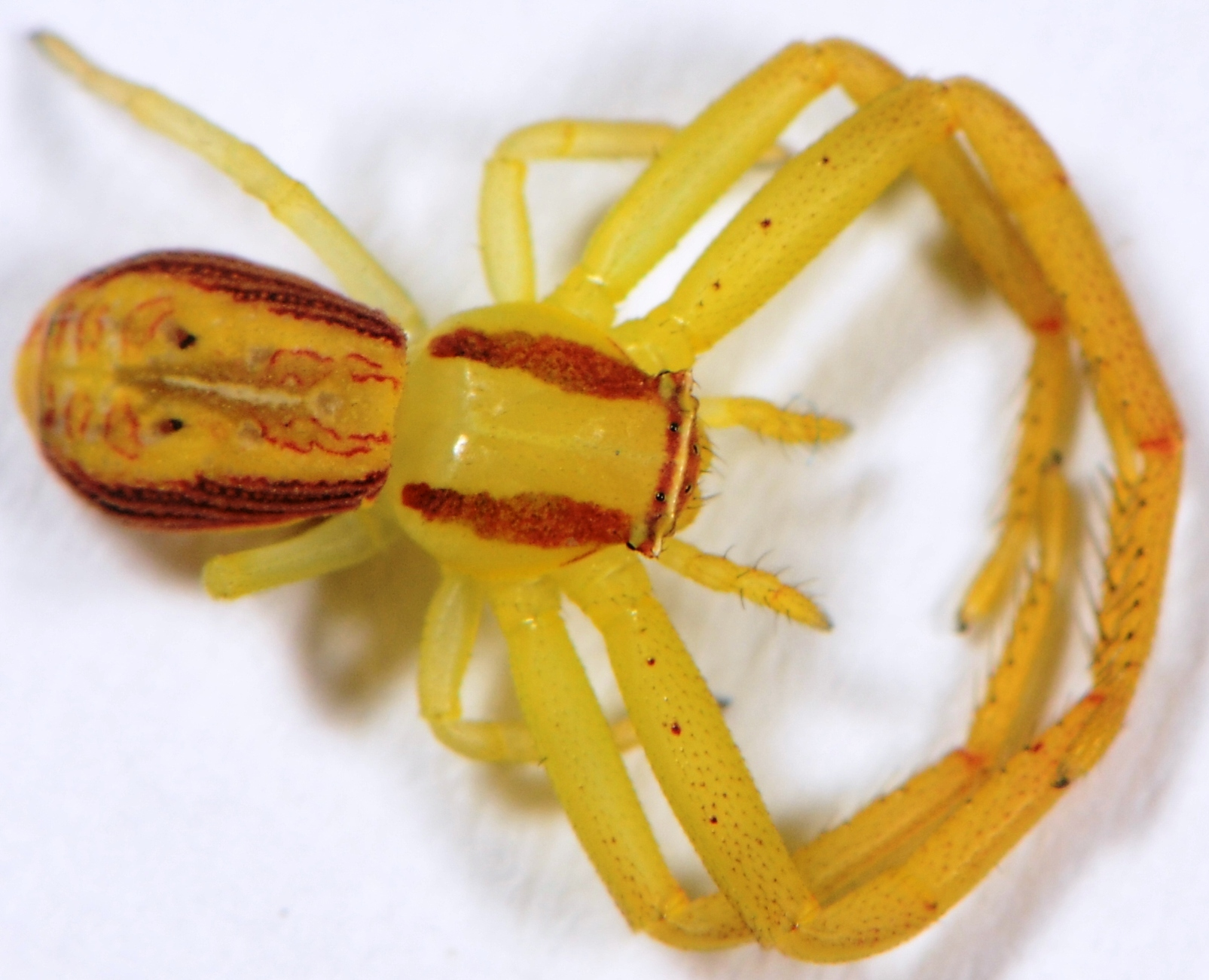
- juvenile female
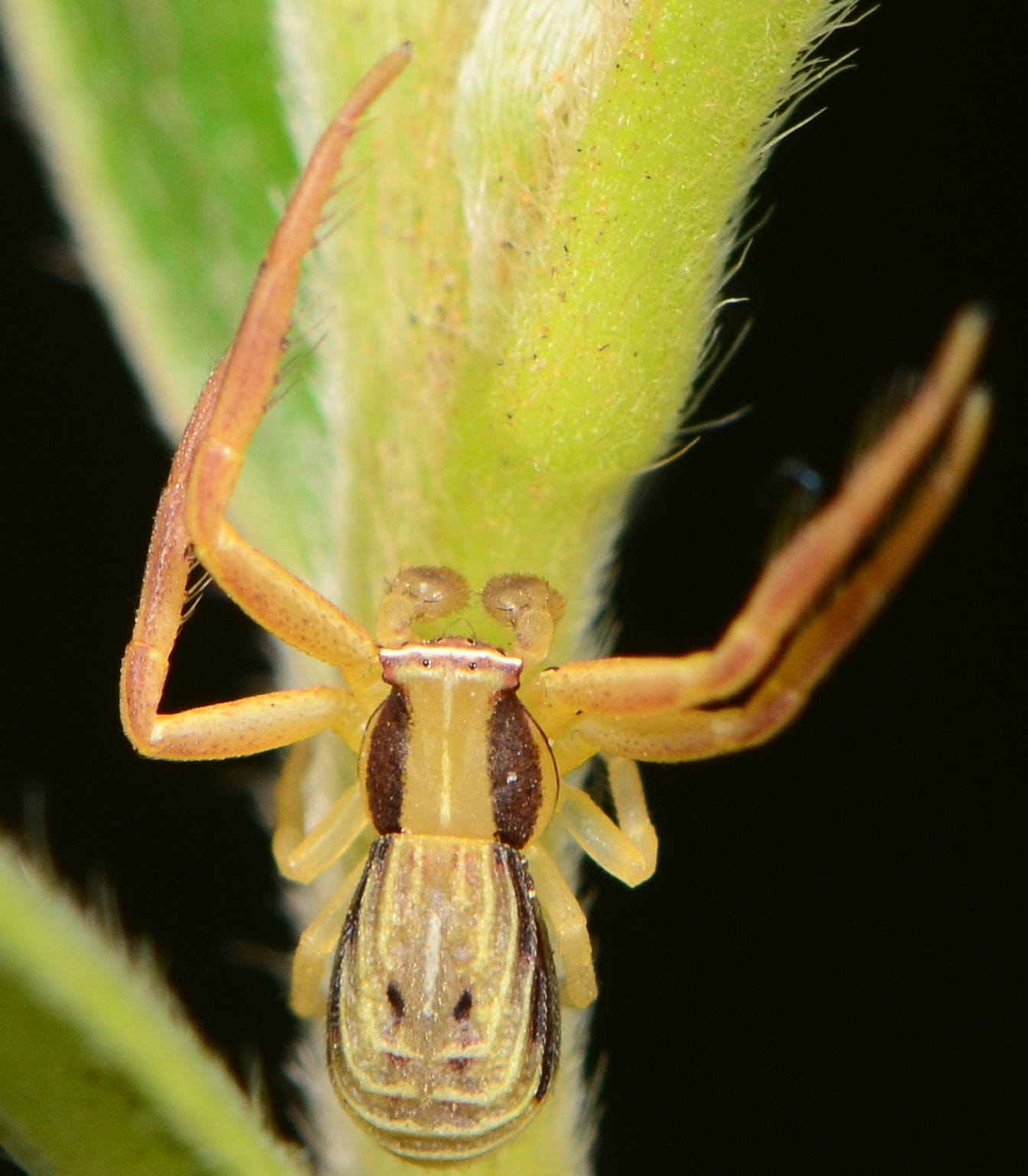
- juvenile male

Scientific classification
- Kingdom: Animalia
- Phylum: Arthropoda
- Subphylum: Chelicerata
- Class: Arachnida
- Order: Araneae
- Infraorder: Araneomorphae
- Family: Thomisidae
- Genus: Runcinia
- Species: R. aethiops

Binomial name
- Runcinia aethiops (Simon, 1901)

Synonyms
- Runciniopsis aethiops Simon, 1901

= Runcinia aethiops =

Species of spider

Runcinia aethiops is a species of spider in the family Thomisidae. It is widespread throughout Africa.

== Distribution ==
Runcinia aethiops occurs throughout Africa.

In South Africa, it has been recorded from all provinces. Notable locations include Addo Elephant National Park, Golden Gate Highlands National Park, Kruger National Park, and De Hoop Nature Reserve.

== Habitat and ecology ==
Runcinia aethiops are common grass dwellers.

The species has been sampled from all floral biomes except the Desert and Succulent Karoo biomes, at altitudes ranging from 15 to 2,785 m. It has also been collected from pine plantations and strawberry fields.

== Description ==
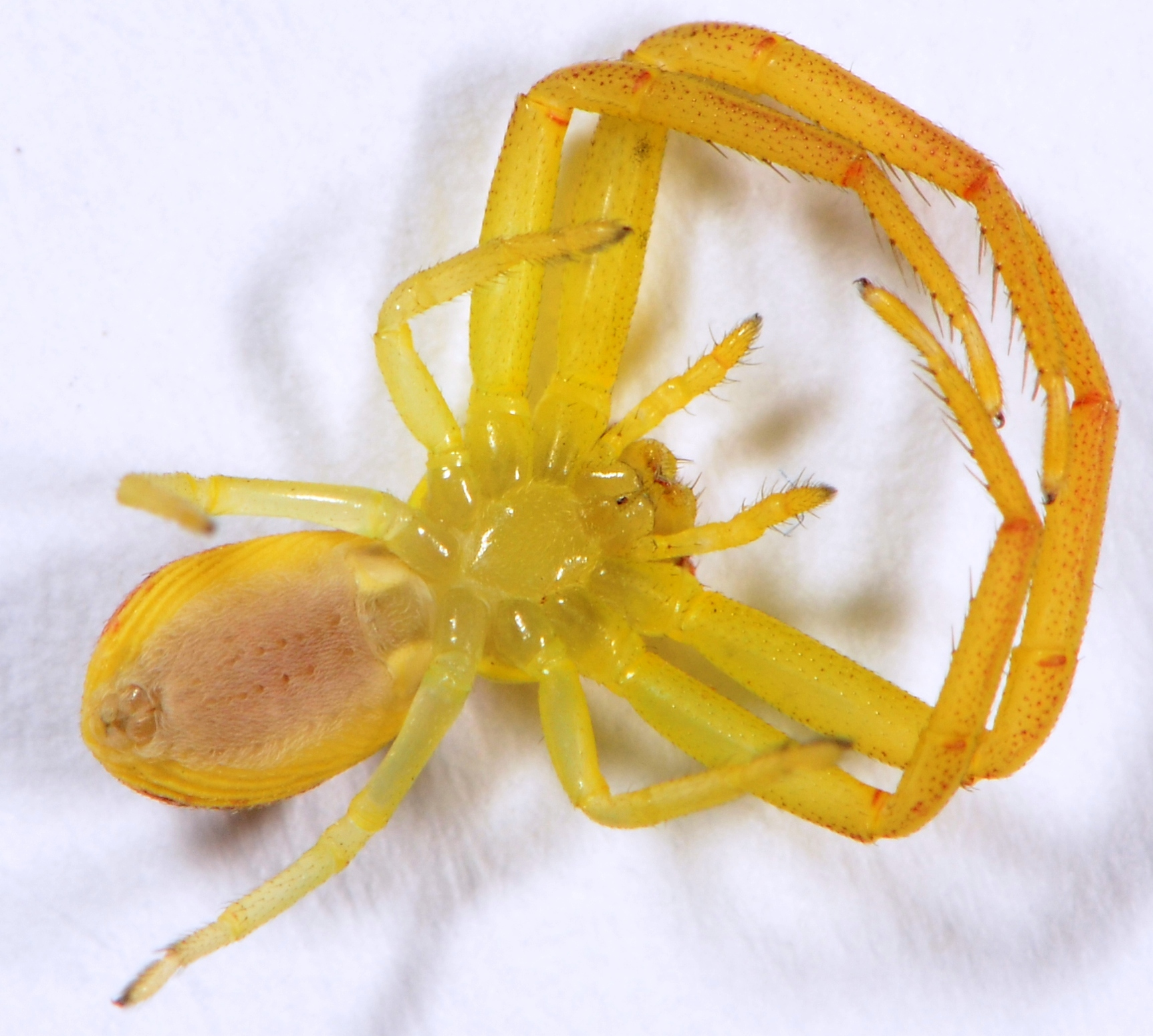
juvenile female, ventral view

Females have a slightly flattened body with the eyes positioned on a distinct carina. The abdomen is decorated with longitudinal striae following its contour, with rows of setae that differ in shape between species.

Males are more slender than females and have longer legs, with front legs bearing brown bands and setae replaced with a brush of hair.

== Conservation ==
Runcinia aethiops is listed as Least Concern due to its wide geographical range. The species is protected in more than twenty protected areas throughout South Africa.

== Taxonomy ==
Runcinia aethiops was originally described by Eugène Simon in 1901 as Runciniopsis aethiops from Ethiopia. The species was revised by Dippenaar-Schoeman in 1980 and is known from both sexes.
