= Zelotes pulchripes =

Scientific classification
- Kingdom: Animalia
- Phylum: Arthropoda
- Subphylum: Chelicerata
- Class: Arachnida
- Order: Araneae
- Infraorder: Araneomorphae
- Family: Gnaphosidae
- Genus: Zelotes
- Species: Z. pulchripes

Binomial name
- Zelotes pulchripes (Purcell, 1908)

Synonyms
- Melanophora pulchripes Purcell, 1908

Species of spider

Zelotes pulchripes is a species of spider in the family Gnaphosidae. It is endemic to South Africa.

== Distribution ==
Zelotes pulchripes is known only from the type locality Steinkopf in the Northern Cape.

== Habitat and ecology ==
The species inhabits the Succulent Karoo biome at an altitude of 870 m above sea level. They are free-running ground spiders found under stones during the day.

== Conservation ==
Zelotes pulchripes is listed as Data Deficient because it is known only from the type locality. More sampling is needed to determine the species' range. There are no significant threats to the species.

== Taxonomy ==
The species was originally described by Purcell in 1908 as Melanophora pulchripes. According to Moira FitzPatrick (2007), the species is misplaced in the genus Zelotes based on the absence of preening comb on leg IV.
