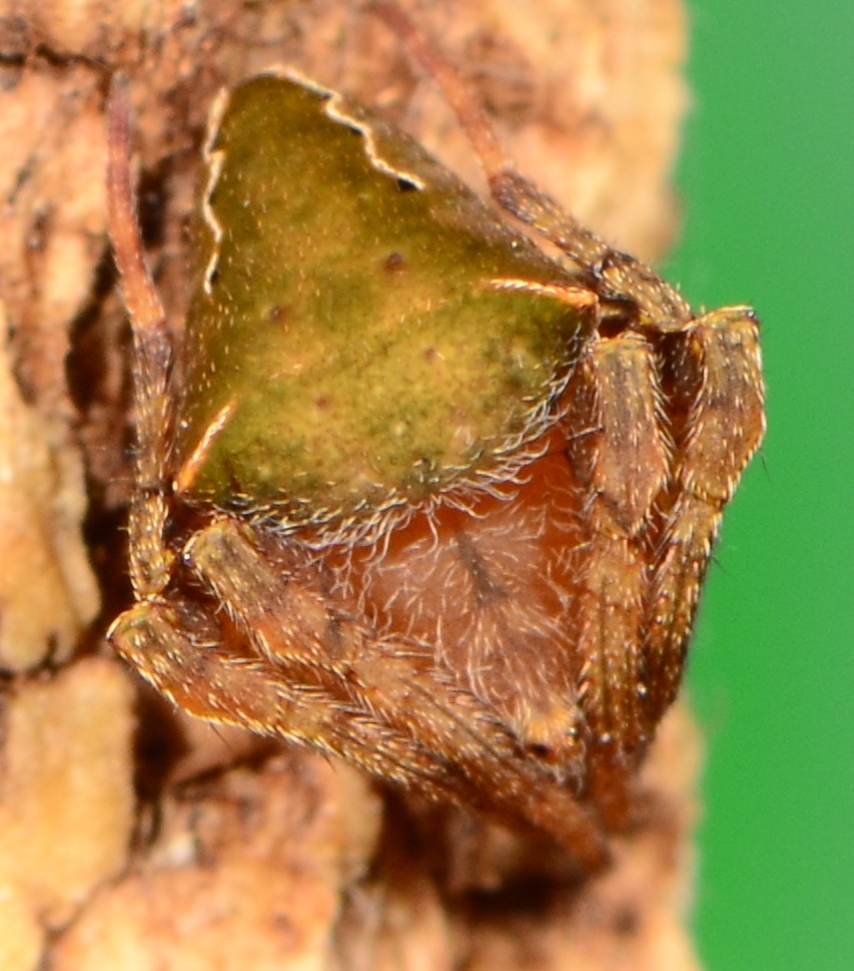
- female
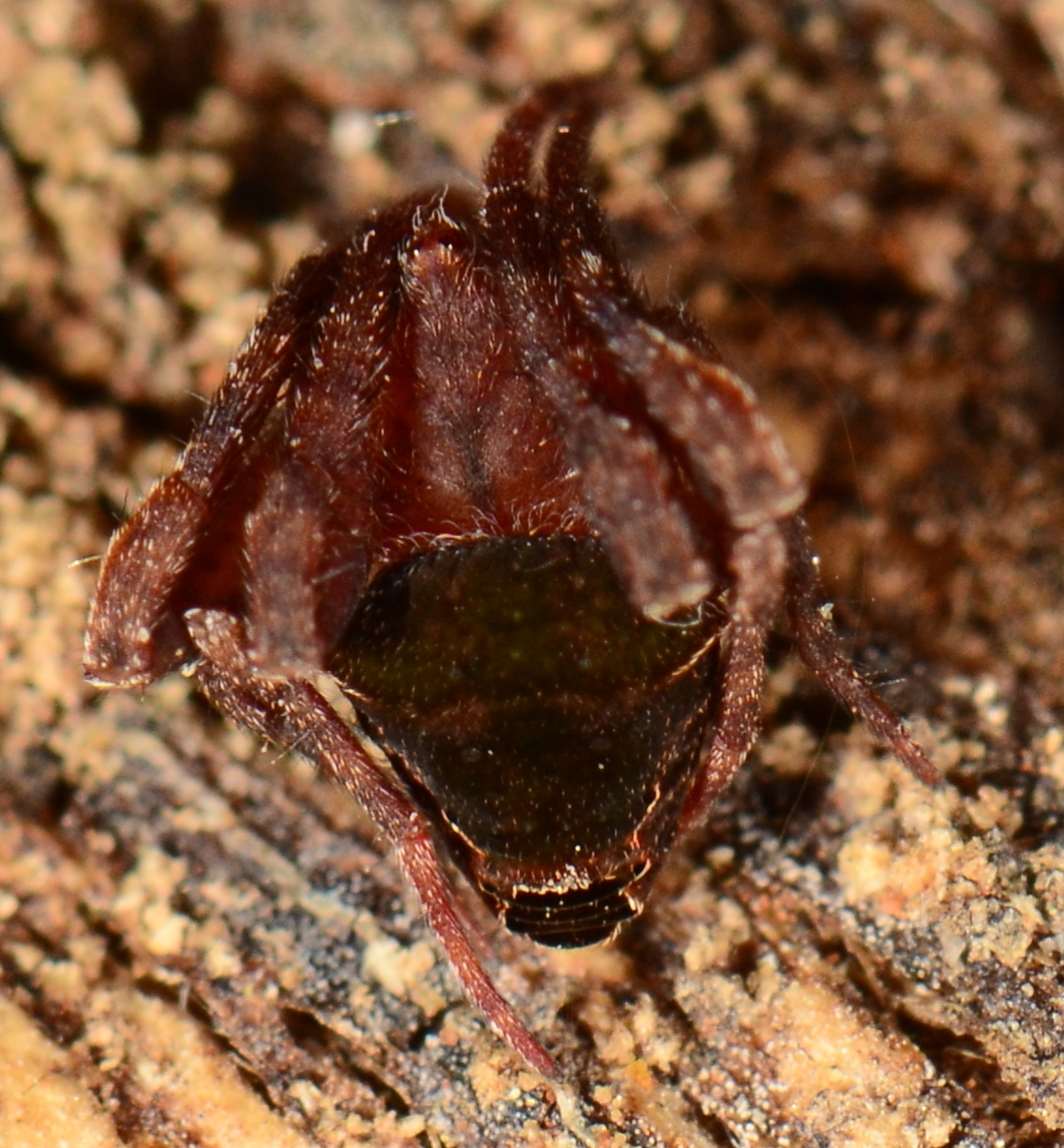
- male

Scientific classification
- Kingdom: Animalia
- Phylum: Arthropoda
- Subphylum: Chelicerata
- Class: Arachnida
- Order: Araneae
- Infraorder: Araneomorphae
- Family: Araneidae
- Genus: Ideocaira
- Species: I. transversa

Binomial name
- Ideocaira transversa Simon, 1903

= Ideocaira transversa =

Triangle Orb-Web Spider

Species of spider

Ideocaira transversa is a species of spider in the family Araneidae. It is endemic to South Africa and is commonly known as the triangle orb-web spider.

== Distribution ==
Ideocaira transversa is found in the South African provinces Eastern Cape, KwaZulu-Natal, Limpopo, and Western Cape. Notable locations include Addo Elephant National Park, Ndumo Game Reserve, and De Hoop Nature Reserve.

== Habitat and ecology ==
The species inhabits multiple biomes including Fynbos, Savanna and Thicket at altitudes ranging from 16 to 1,732 m above sea level.

Ideocaira transversa is an orb-web spider that constructs webs during its hunting activities.

== Description ==
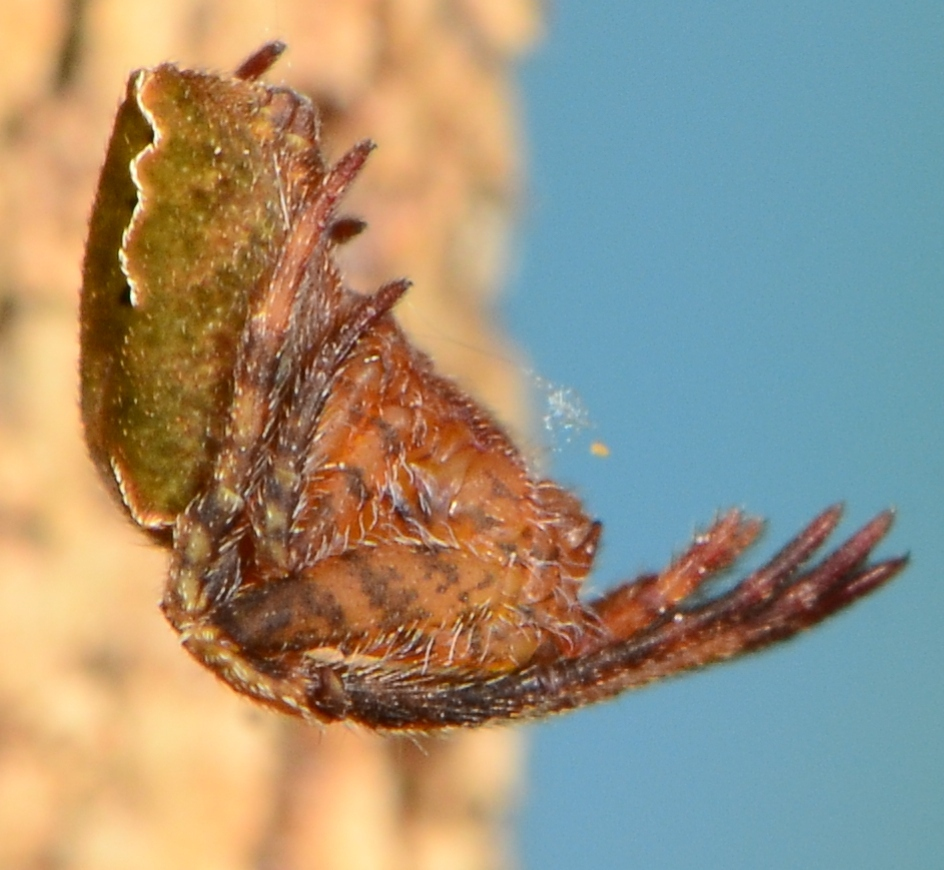
female

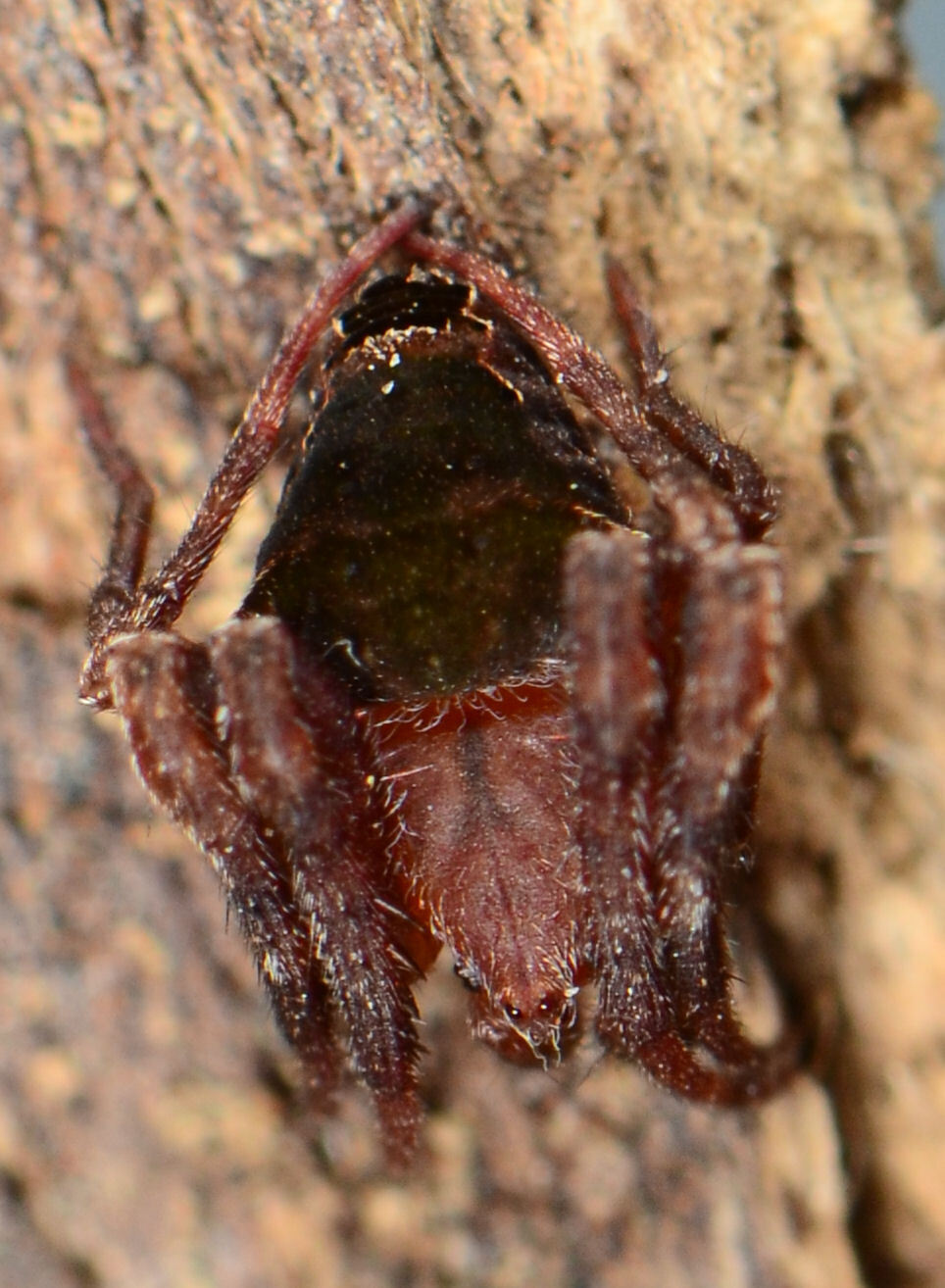
male

== Conservation ==
Ideocaira transversa is listed as Least Concern by the South African National Biodiversity Institute due to its wide range across four provinces. The species is protected in eight protected areas including Addo Elephant National Park, Ndumo Game Reserve, Phinda Game Reserve, Tembe Elephant Park, uMkhuze Game Reserve, Lekgalameetse Nature Reserve, Polokwane Nature Reserve, and De Hoop Nature Reserve.

== Taxonomy ==
The species was originally described by Eugène Simon in 1903 from Natal (now KwaZulu-Natal). The species is known only from females, with no male specimens having been described.
