= Zelotes capsula =

Winterhoek Dark Ground Spider

Conservation status
- Least Concern (SANBI Red List)

Scientific classification
- Kingdom: Animalia
- Phylum: Arthropoda
- Subphylum: Chelicerata
- Class: Arachnida
- Order: Araneae
- Infraorder: Araneomorphae
- Family: Gnaphosidae
- Genus: Zelotes
- Species: Z. capsula

Binomial name
- Zelotes capsula Tucker, 1923

Species of spider

Zelotes capsula is a species of spider in the family Gnaphosidae. It is commonly known as the Winterhoek dark ground spider.

== Distribution ==
Zelotes capsula is endemic to South Africa. It has been recorded from Eastern Cape and Western Cape, at altitudes ranging from 6 to 266 m above sea level.

The species was originally described from the Great Winterhoek Mountains in the Western Cape. Notable locations include De Hoop Nature Reserve and Jeffrey's Bay.

== Habitat and ecology ==
The species inhabits the Fynbos biome. These are free-running spiders that are found under stones during the day.

== Conservation ==
Zelotes capsula is listed as Least Concern by the South African National Biodiversity Institute. There are no significant threats impacting this species and it is suspected to be undersampled. It is protected in De Hoop Nature Reserve.

== Taxonomy ==
The species was described by Tucker in 1923 from the Great Winterhoek Mountains in the Western Cape. It was revised by FitzPatrick in 2007. The species is known from both sexes.
