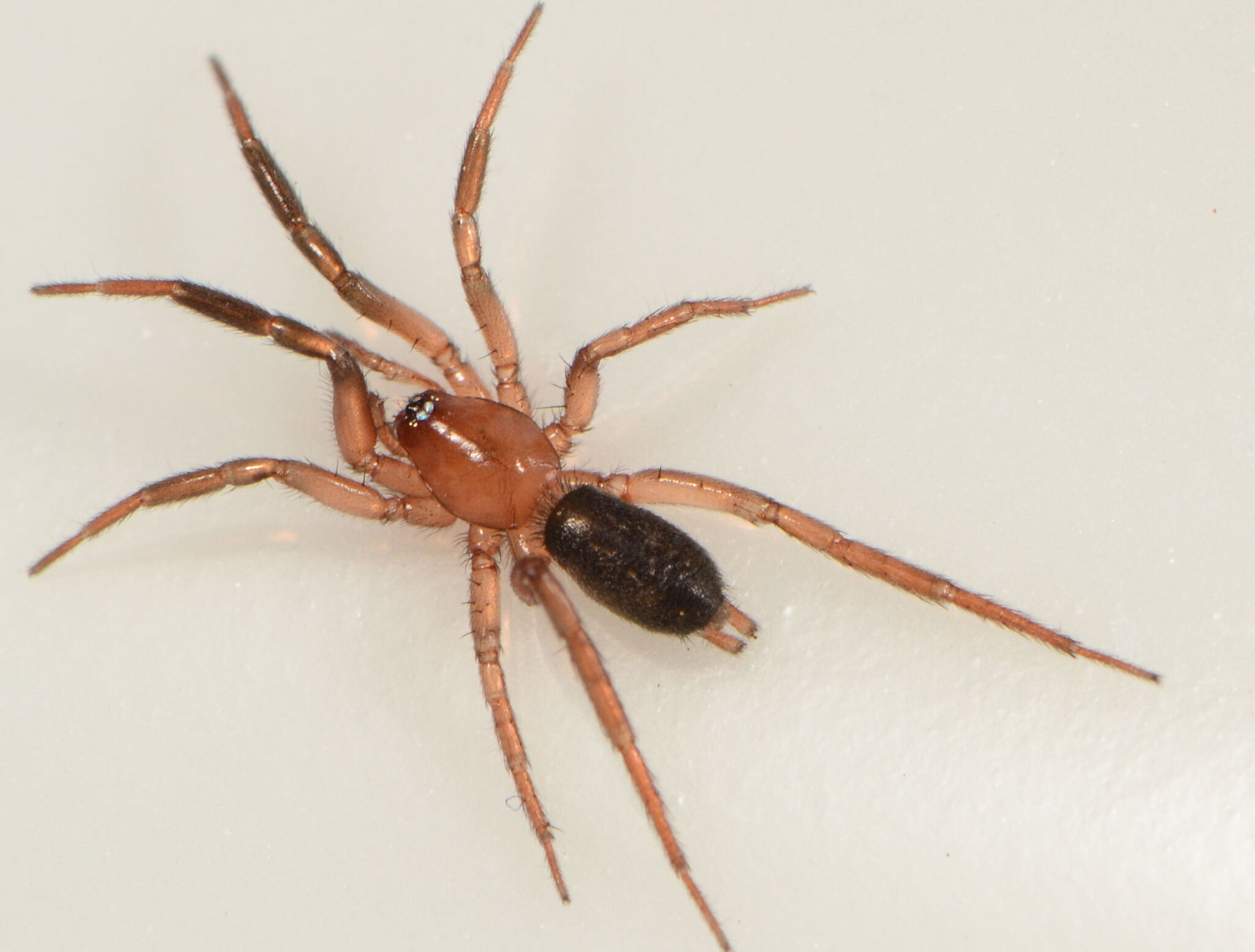
- Female
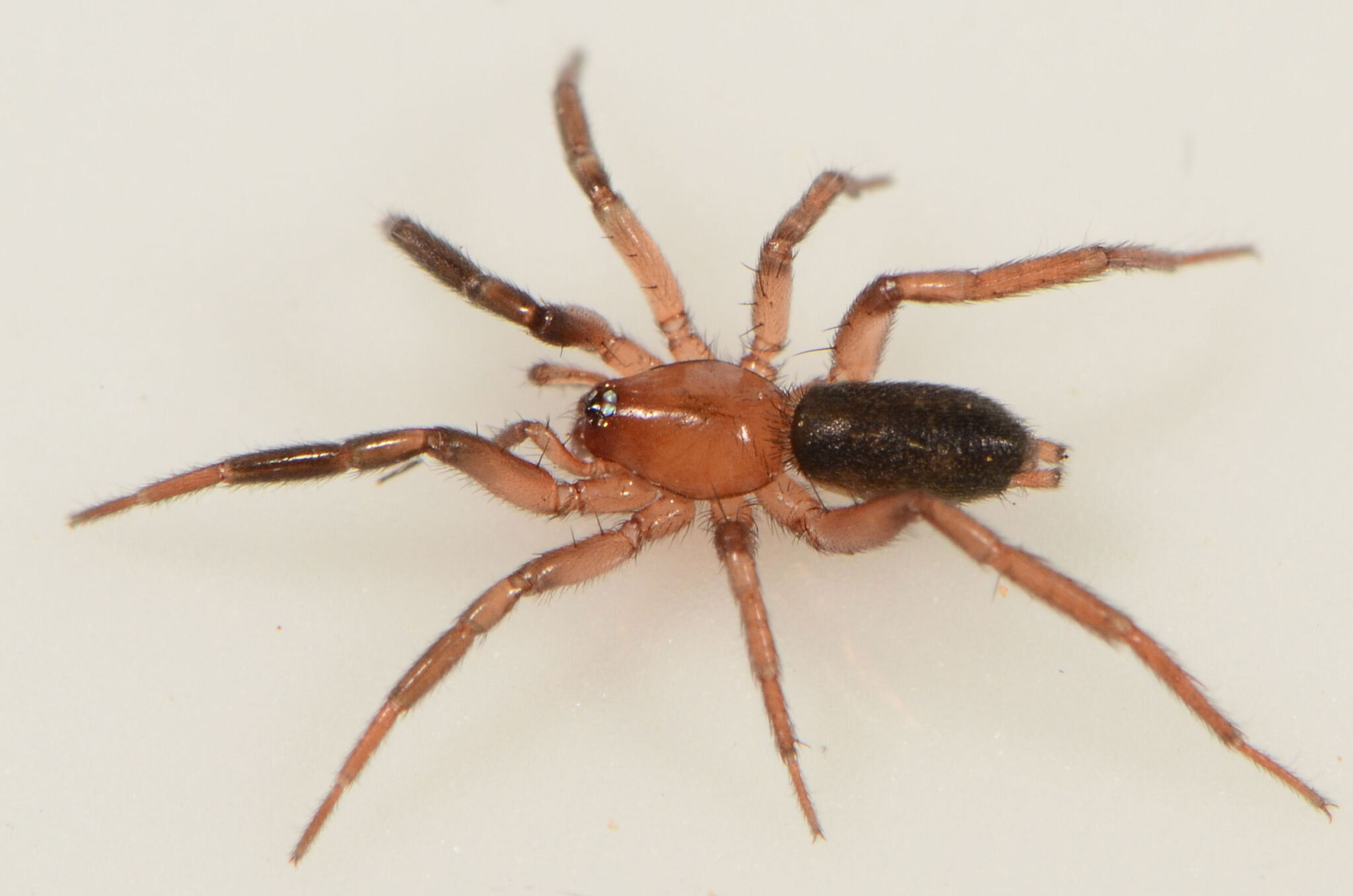
- Female

Scientific classification
- Kingdom: Animalia
- Phylum: Arthropoda
- Subphylum: Chelicerata
- Class: Arachnida
- Order: Araneae
- Infraorder: Araneomorphae
- Family: Gnaphosidae
- Genus: Zelotes
- Species: Z. reduncus

Binomial name
- Zelotes reduncus (Purcell, 1907)

Synonyms
- Melanophora redunca Purcell, 1907; Zelotes anchora Tucker, 1923

= Zelotes reduncus =

Common Dark Ground Spider

Species of spider

Zelotes reduncus is a species of spider in the family Gnaphosidae. It is commonly known as common dark ground spider and occurs in southern Africa.

== Distribution ==
Zelotes reduncus occurs in Lesotho and South Africa. In South Africa, it has a wide distribution and is recorded from eight provinces: Eastern Cape, Free State, Gauteng, KwaZulu-Natal, Limpopo, Mpumalanga, Northern Cape, and Western Cape.

== Habitat and ecology ==
The species has a wide altitudinal range, occurring from 4 to 2,892 m above sea level. They are free-running ground spiders found under stones during the day and inhabit the Fynbos, Grassland, Nama and Succulent Karoo, and Savanna biomes.

== Description ==
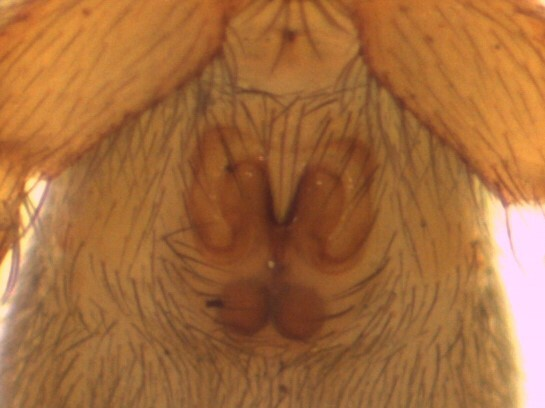
female

== Conservation ==
Zelotes reduncus is listed as Least Concern by the South African National Biodiversity Institute due to its wide range. The species is protected in more than ten protected areas. There are no significant threats to the species.

== Taxonomy ==
The species was originally described by Purcell in 1907 from Kalkbay Mountains as Melanophora redunca. FitzPatrick (2007) revised the species and synonymized Zelotes anchora Tucker, 1923 with this species. It is known from both sexes.
