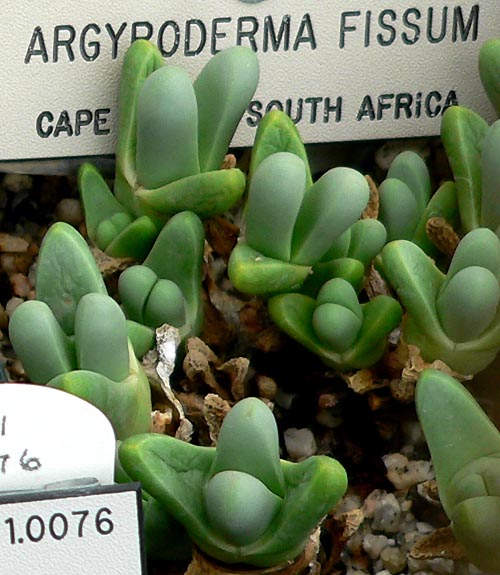
- Argyroderma fissum

Scientific classification
- Kingdom: Plantae
- Clade: Embryophytes
- Clade: Tracheophytes
- Clade: Angiosperms
- Clade: Eudicots
- Order: Caryophyllales
- Family: Aizoaceae
- Subfamily: Ruschioideae
- Tribe: Ruschieae
- Genus: Argyroderma; N.E.Br.

Species
- See text

= Argyroderma =

Genus of plants

Argyroderma is a genus consisting of a dozen species of succulents in the iceplant family from South Africa.

== Description ==
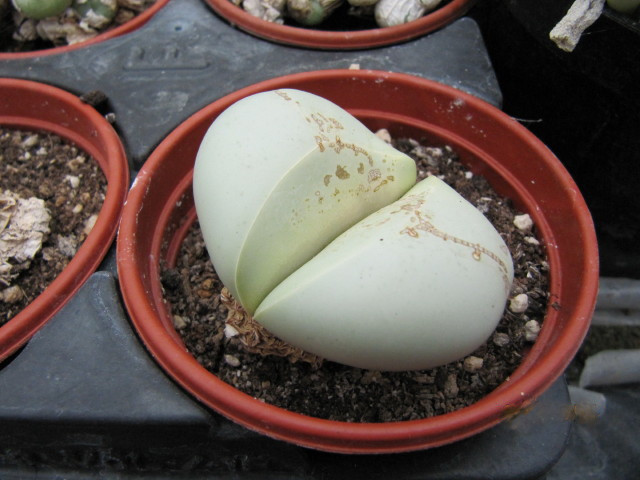
Argyroderma testiculare in cultivation

These distinctive plants are among those known as "living stones", because their highly succulent, usually stemless, blue-green leaves occur at ground level and can resemble small stones. They form small clumps of a few or many paired, usually cylindrical to egg-shaped leaves that are cleft in the center. Each stem bears just 2 leaves per season but may produce offsets over the years. In some species the old leaves persist and form a short column on which new leaves develop. Solitary daisy-like flowers, usually white, yellow, or purple, appear in the cleft.

== Distribution ==
The entire genus is naturally confined to a relatively small region in the far west of South Africa, known locally as the "Knersvlakte" area. This is a very arid region of winter-rainfall desert and rocky quartzite sands.

== Cultivation ==
Like most succulents, they require extremely well-drained soil, and are damaged by repeated frosts. Their preferred mode of cultivation is a bright and sunny position with gritty free-draining soil. They may be propagated from seed, or careful division of established clumps.

== Diversification and evolution ==
The Cape Floristic Region in South Africa is home to a diverse range of plant life, believed to have evolved through widespread evolutionary radiation. Within the family Aizoaceae, the genus Argyroderma shows evidence of diversification due to spatially isolated populations experiencing phenotypic divergence from different habitat conditions, leading to genetic differentiation and varying flowering times. This pattern suggests adaptive radiation in separate populations played a key role in the evolution of the ice-plant family in the diverse landscapes of the southern African winter rainfall deserts.

== Species ==
As of January 2025, the Catalogue of Life includes 12 species of Argyroderma:

Image	Scientific name	Distribution
	Argyroderma congregatum L.Bolus	Cape Provinces
	Argyroderma crateriforme (L.Bolus) N.E.Br.	Cape Provinces
	Argyroderma delaetii Maass	Cape Provinces
	Argyroderma fissum (Haw.) L.Bolus	Cape Provinces
	Argyroderma framesii L.Bolus	Cape Provinces
	Argyroderma patens L.Bolus	Cape Provinces
	Argyroderma pearsonii (N.E.Br.) Schwantes	Cape Provinces
	Argyroderma ringens L.Bolus	Cape Provinces (Vanrhynsdorp District)
	Argyroderma subalbum (N.E.Br.) N.E.Br.	Cape Provinces (Vredendal District)
	Argyroderma testiculare (Aiton) N.E.Br.	Cape Provinces (Vanrhynsdorp District)
	Argyroderma theartii van Jaarsv.	Cape Provinces (Vanrhynsdorp District)
	Argyroderma × octophyllum (Haw.) Schwantes (A. delaetii × A. fissum)	Cape Provinces
