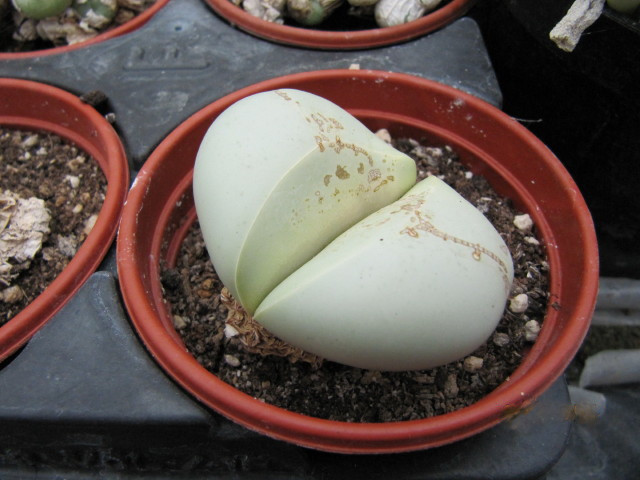

Conservation status
- Regionally Extinct (SANBI Red List)

Scientific classification
- Kingdom: Plantae
- Clade: Tracheophytes
- Clade: Angiosperms
- Clade: Eudicots
- Order: Caryophyllales
- Family: Aizoaceae
- Genus: Argyroderma
- Species: A. testiculare

Binomial name
- Argyroderma testiculare (Aiton) N.E.Br.

= Argyroderma testiculare =

Species

Argyroderma testiculare (Afrikaans: bokklootjies) is a species of succulents endemic to the quartz gravel of the Knersvlakte region. of South Africa's Western Cape. It belongs to the Aizoaceae family, and is listed as rare on the SANBI Red List, because it occurs in an area smaller than 68 km^{2}, but it is not endangered there.

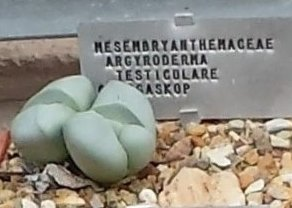
Argyroderma testiculare

It is a small plant that does not grow larger than 15 cm. The leaves are thick and look like an egg which has been chopped in half. The flowers are purple with a yellow centre.

== Conservation status ==
Argyroderma testiculare has an EOO of 68 km^{2}, thus giving it the classification of Rare. There are no severe threats to the species as most of its habitat is protected.
