= Oophytum oviforme =

Scientific classification
- Kingdom: Plantae
- Clade: Tracheophytes
- Clade: Angiosperms
- Clade: Eudicots
- Order: Caryophyllales
- Family: Aizoaceae
- Genus: Oophytum
- Species: O. oviforme

Binomial name
- Oophytum oviforme (N.E.Br.) N.E.Br.

Synonyms
- Conophytum mutatum G.D.Rowley; Conophytum oviforme (N.E.Br.) N.E.Br.; Mesembryanthemum oviforme N.E.Br.; Oophytum nordenstamii L.Bolus

Species of succulent

Oophytum oviforme, commonly known as the krapogies, is a small succulent plant that is part of the Aizoaceae family. The species is endemic to South Africa and occurs in the Western Cape.
