= Walker Bay Nature Reserve =

Coastal nature reserve in the Western Cape province of South Africa

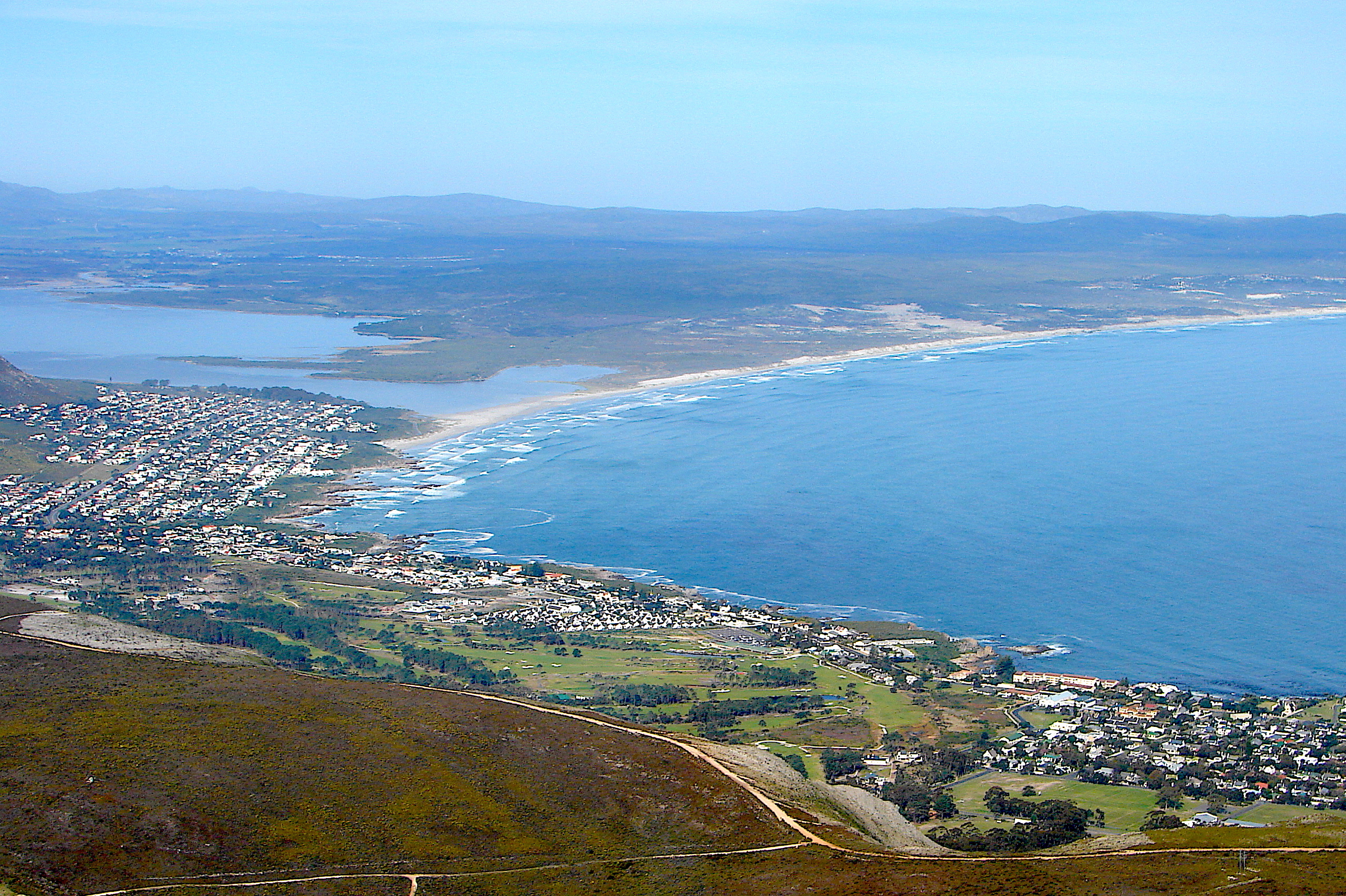
- Coastline of Walker Bay with Klein river lagoon

- Location within Western Cape
- Location: Overberg, Western Cape, South Africa
- Nearest city: Hermanus, Gansbaai
- Coordinates: 34°29′S 19°22′E
- Governing body: CapeNature
- Website: www.capenature.co.za/reserves/walker-bay-nature-reserve/

Walker Bay Nature Reserve is a nature reserve made up of five areas located on the coast between Hermanus and Cape Agulhas, in the Overberg region in the Western Cape province of South Africa. It is administered by CapeNature.
