= Ideocaira triquetra =

Yellow Triangle Orb-Web Spider

Scientific classification
- Kingdom: Animalia
- Phylum: Arthropoda
- Subphylum: Chelicerata
- Class: Arachnida
- Order: Araneae
- Infraorder: Araneomorphae
- Family: Araneidae
- Genus: Ideocaira
- Species: I. triquetra

Binomial name
- Ideocaira triquetra Simon, 1903

Species of spider

Ideocaira triquetra is a species of spider in the family Araneidae. It is endemic to South Africa and is commonly known as the yellow triangle orb-web spider.

== Distribution ==
Ideocaira triquetra is endemic to the Eastern Cape province, where it was originally described from Port Elizabeth. The species has been recorded from several localities throughout the province.

== Habitat and ecology ==
The species inhabits multiple biomes including Fynbos, Savanna and Thicket at altitudes ranging from 1 to 1,364 m above sea level.

Ideocaira triquetra is an orb-web spider that constructs webs during its hunting activities.

== Conservation ==
Ideocaira triquetra is listed as Least Concern by the South African National Biodiversity Institute due to its wide geographical range within the Eastern Cape province.

== Taxonomy ==
The species was originally described by Eugène Simon in 1903 from Port Elizabeth. Both male and female specimens are known for this species.
