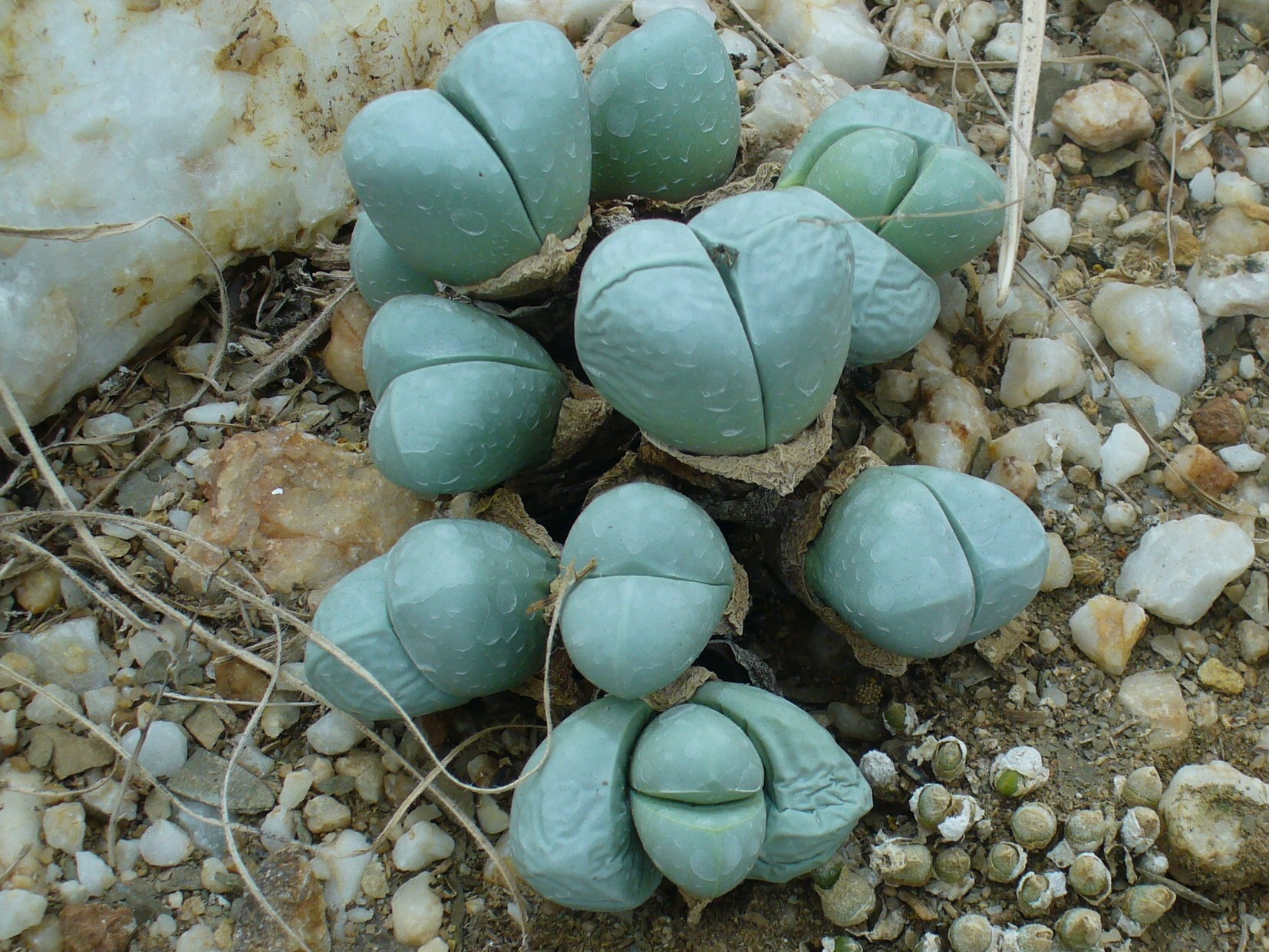

Scientific classification
- Kingdom: Plantae
- Clade: Tracheophytes
- Clade: Angiosperms
- Clade: Eudicots
- Order: Caryophyllales
- Family: Aizoaceae
- Genus: Oophytum
- Species: O. nanum

Binomial name
- Oophytum nanum (Schltr.) L.Bolus

Synonyms
- Conophytum rescriptum G.D.Rowley; Mesembryanthemum nanum Schltr.

= Oophytum nanum =

Species of succulent

Oophytum nanum, commonly known as the small eggfig, is a small succulent plant that is part of the Aizoaceae family. The species is endemic to South Africa and occurs in the Western Cape.
