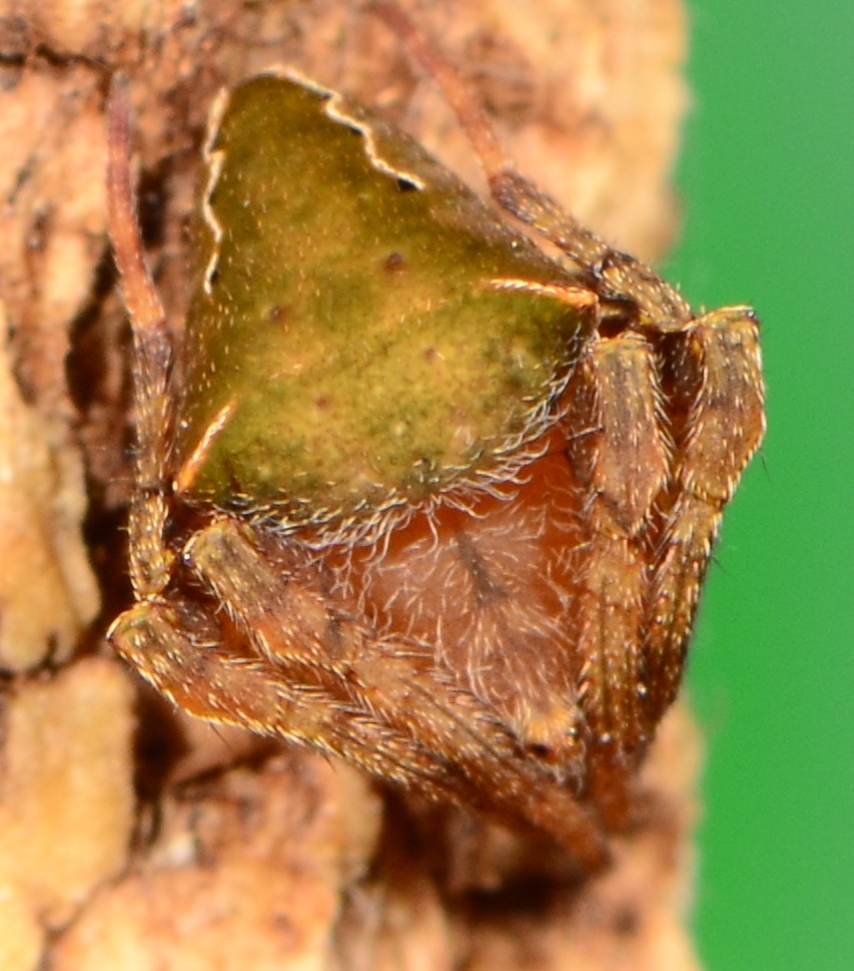
- female I. transversa
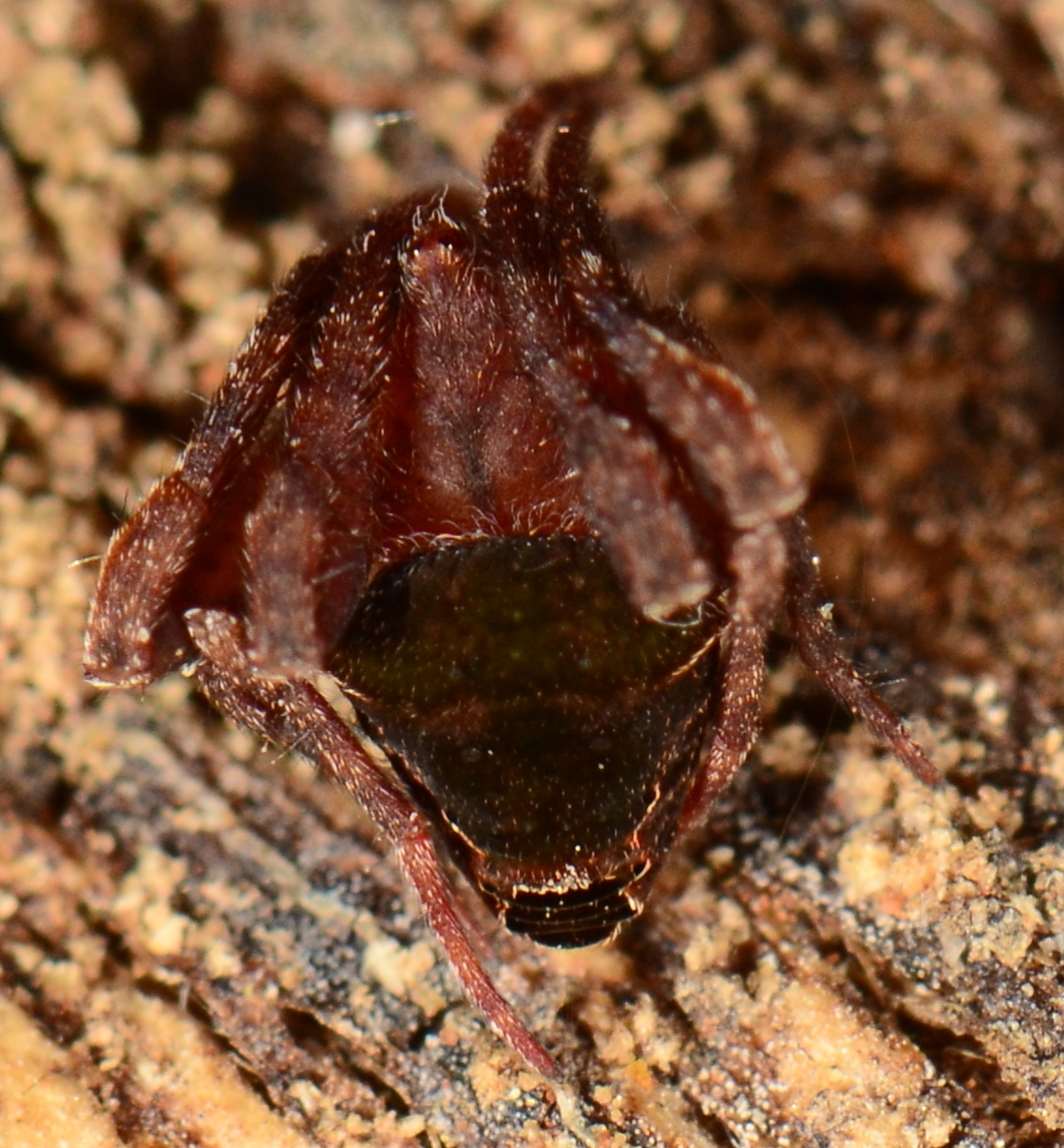
- male I. transversa

Scientific classification
- Kingdom: Animalia
- Phylum: Arthropoda
- Subphylum: Chelicerata
- Class: Arachnida
- Order: Araneae
- Infraorder: Araneomorphae
- Family: Araneidae
- Genus: Ideocaira; Simon, 1903

Type species
- I. transversa Simon, 1903

Species
- I. transversa Simon, 1903; I. triquetra Simon, 1903

= Ideocaira =

Genus of spiders

Ideocaira is a genus of African orb-weaver spiders first described by Eugène Simon in 1903. It contains only two species, both found in South Africa.

== Description ==
The total length female and male is 8-10 mm.

The genus is recognised by the triangular shape of the abdomen. When resting, the legs are pulled close to the body. Their color varies from yellow orange to brown. The carapace pear-shaped.

The eye area is narrowed, more so in males. The median eyes are grouped together with posterior median eyes larger than anterior median eyes. The lateral eyes are positioned more to the back and close together. The fovea is longitudinal.

The abdomen is triangular and anteriorly truncated. The front legs are strong with strong setae on the tibiae.

== Life style ==
They make orb-webs at night, but little more is known about their behaviour.

== Species ==
As of September 2025, this genus includes two species:

- Ideocaira transversa Simon, 1903 (type species)
- Ideocaira triquetra Simon, 1903
