= Knersvlakte Nature Reserve =

WWF nature reserve in the Western Cape, South Africa

- Location in the Western Cape
- Location: Matzikama Municipality, Western Cape, South Africa
- Nearest town: Vredendal
- Coordinates: 31°20′S 18°40′E
- Area: 855 km^{2} (330 sq mi)
- Established: 9 September 2014
- Governing body: CapeNature
- Owner: WWF South Africa
- Knersvlakte Nature Reserve (South Africa) Knersvlakte Nature Reserve (Western Cape)

The Knersvlakte Nature Reserve is a nature reserve in the Knersvlakte region of South Africa's Western Cape province. It covers an area of 855 square kilometres (330 sq mi) in the Matzikama Municipality, north of Vredendal and Vanrhynsdorp. The reserve, which was established on 24 September 2014, is owned by the South African branch of the World Wide Fund for Nature and managed by provincial conservation agency CapeNature.

Of the 1 500 plant species in the Knersvlakte, about 190 species are endemic to the region. Around 155 of these are threatened with extinction, as they succumb easily to climatic conditions and changes.

The Knersvlakte is one of the richest and most diverse succulent regions in the world.
