= CapeNature =

Governmental organisation in South Africa

- Western Cape Nature Conservation Board

Agency overview
- Formed: 15 January 1999
- Jurisdiction: Government of the Western Cape
- Headquarters: Shared Services Centre, cnr. Bosduif and Volstruis St., Bridgetown, Cape Town
- Minister responsible: Anton Bredell, Minister of Local Government, Environment Affairs and Development Planning
- Parent agency: Department of Environment Affairs and Development Planning
- Website: www.capenature.co.za

CapeNature (officially the Western Cape Nature Conservation Board) is a governmental organisation responsible for maintaining wilderness areas and public nature reserves in Western Cape Province, South Africa.

== Parks managed by CapeNature ==
=== West Coast ===
- Cederberg Wilderness Area
- Bird Island Nature Reserve
- Rocherpan Nature Reserve
- Groot Winterhoek Wilderness Area
- Knersvlakte Nature Reserve
- Matjiesrivier Nature Reserve
- Riverlands Nature Reserve

=== Winelands ===
- Limietberg Nature Reserve
- Jonkershoek Nature Reserve
- Assegaaibosch Nature Reserve
- Hottentots Holland Nature Reserve
- Vrolijkheid Nature Reserve

=== Overberg ===
- Marloth Nature Reserve
- Kogelberg Nature Reserve
- Walker Bay Nature Reserve
- Salmonsdam Nature Reserve
- De Mond Nature Reserve
- De Hoop Nature Reserve
- Grootvadersbosch Nature Reserve
- Boosmansbos Wilderness Area

=== Cape Karoo ===
- Anysberg Nature Reserve
- Swartberg Nature Reserve
- Gamkaberg Nature Reserve
- Kamanassie Nature Reserve

=== Garden Route and Little Karoo ===
- Outeniqua Nature Reserve
- Goukamma Nature Reserve
- Keurbooms River Nature Reserve
- Robberg Nature Reserve

== See also ==
- South African National Parks – Body responsible for managing South Africa's national parks
- Protected areas of South Africa
