= Succulent Karoo =

Desert ecoregion of South Africa and Namibia

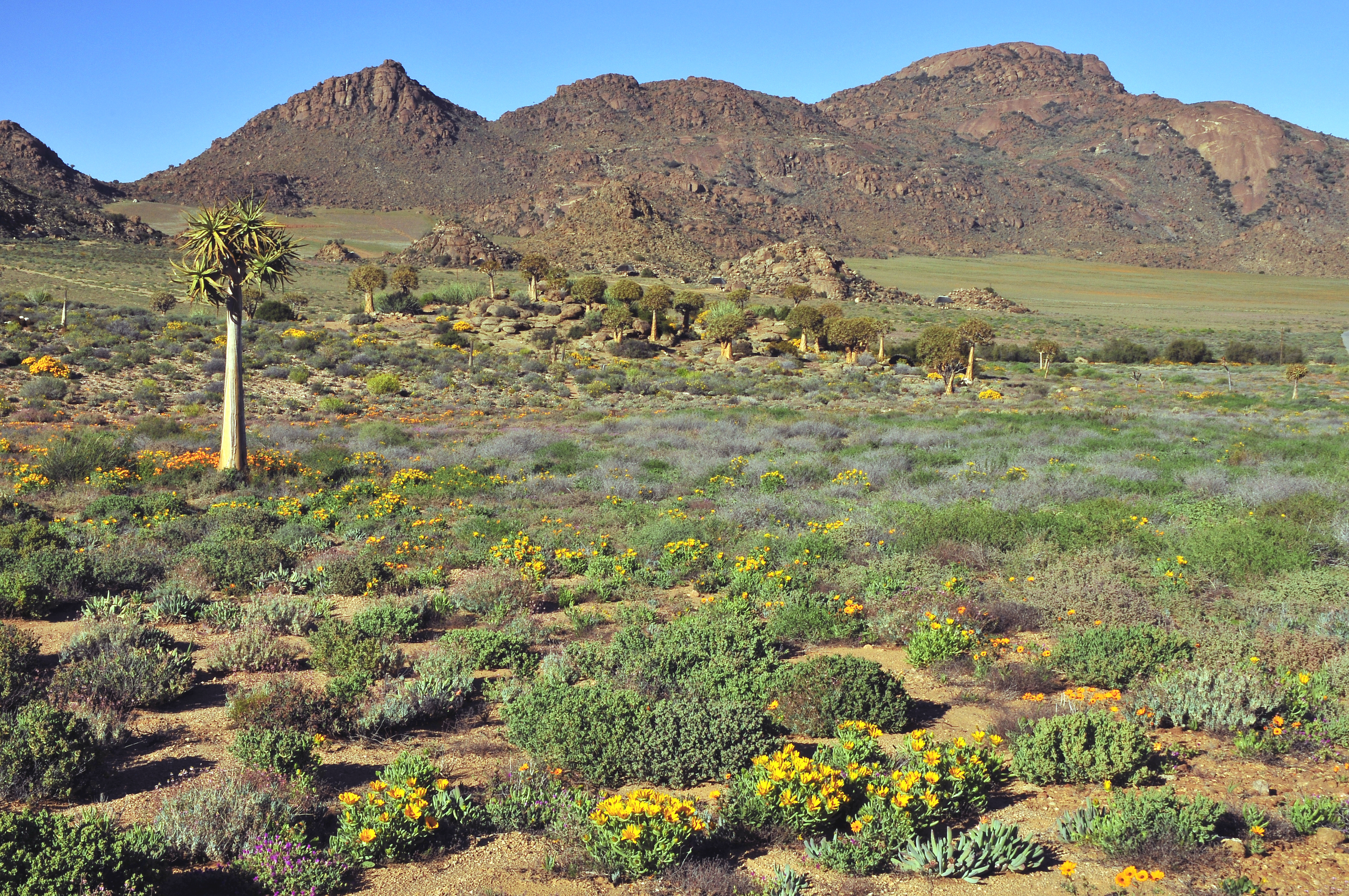
- Goegap Nature Reserve, South Africa

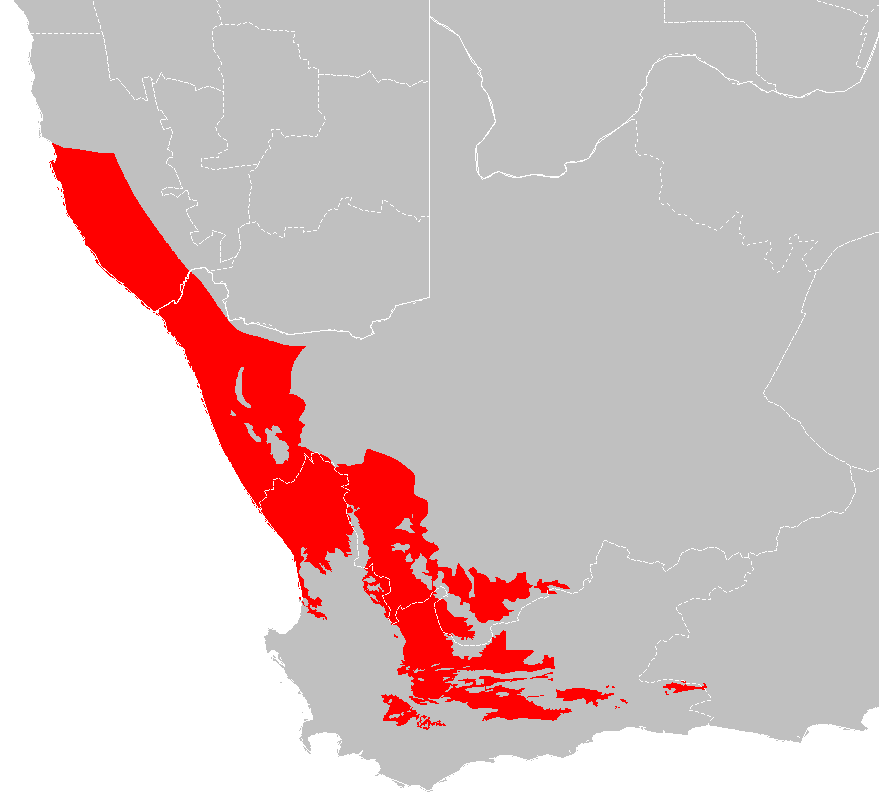
- location of the ecoregion

Ecology
- Realm: Afrotropical
- Biome: deserts and xeric shrublands
- Borders: Nama Karoo; Namib Desert; Lowland fynbos and renosterveld, Montane fynbos and renosterveld

Geography
- Area: 102,700 km^{2} (39,700 mi^{2})
- Countries: South Africa; Namibia

Conservation
- Conservation status: Relatively stable
- Protected: 2352 km^{2} (2%)

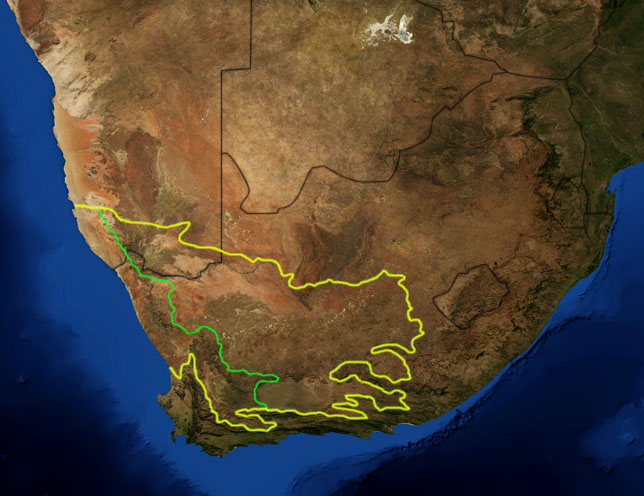
Map of the two Karoo ecoregions as delineated by the WWF. Satellite image from NASA. The yellow line encloses the two ecoregions. The green line separates the Succulent Karoo, on the west, from the Nama Karoo, on the east. National boundaries are shown in black.

The Succulent Karoo is an ecoregion defined by the World Wide Fund for Nature to include regions of desert in South Africa and Namibia, and a biodiversity hotspot. The geographic area chosen by the WWF for what they call 'Succulent Karoo' does not correspond to the actual Karoo.

== Geography ==
The Succulent Karoo stretches along the coastal strip of southwestern Namibia and South Africa's Northern Cape Province, where the cold Benguela Current offshore creates frequent fogs. The ecoregion extends inland into the uplands of South Africa's Western Cape Province. It is bounded on the south by the Mediterranean climate fynbos, on the east by the Nama Karoo, which has more extreme temperatures and variable rainfall, and on the north by the Namib Desert.

Succulent Karoo vegetation types

== Flora ==
The Succulent Karoo is notable for the world's richest flora of succulent plants, and harbours about one-third of the world's approximately 10,000 succulent species. 40% of its succulent plants are endemic. The region is extraordinarily rich in geophytes, harbouring approximately 630 species.

== Fauna ==
The ecoregion is a centre of diversity and endemism for reptiles and many invertebrates. Of the ecoregion's 50 scorpion species, 22 are endemic. Monkey beetles, largely endemic to southern Africa, are concentrated in the Succulent Karoo and are important pollinators of the flora. So, too, are the Hymenoptera and masarine wasps, and colletid, fideliid, and melittid bees.

Approximately 15 amphibians are found in this ecoregion, including three endemics; among the region's 115 reptile species, 48 are endemic and 15 are strict endemics. The Sperrgebiet region is a hotspot for an unusual tortoise, the Nama padloper. Endemism is present, but less pronounced, among the Succulent Karoo's bird and mammal populations.

== Conservation ==
The ecoregion has been designated a biodiversity hotspot by Conservation International. Conservation South Africa has provided stewardship and land-management support and administered a small-grants fund known as SKEPPIES.

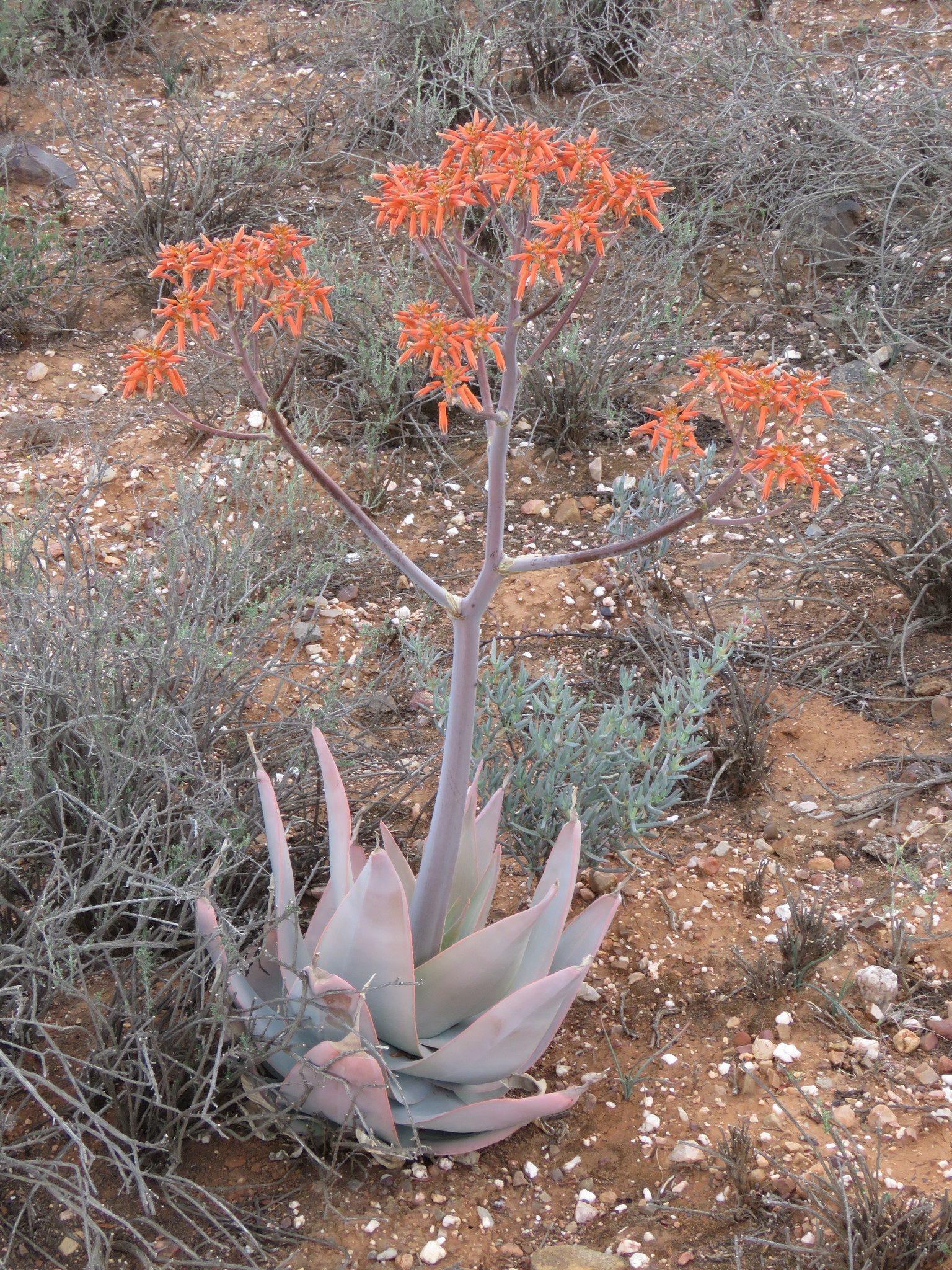
Aloe striata, a typical Succulent Karoo plant

== See also ==
- Knersvlakte
- Knersvlakte Nature Reserve
- List of vegetation types of South Africa
