= De Hoop Nature Reserve =

Nature reserve in the Western Cape, South Africa

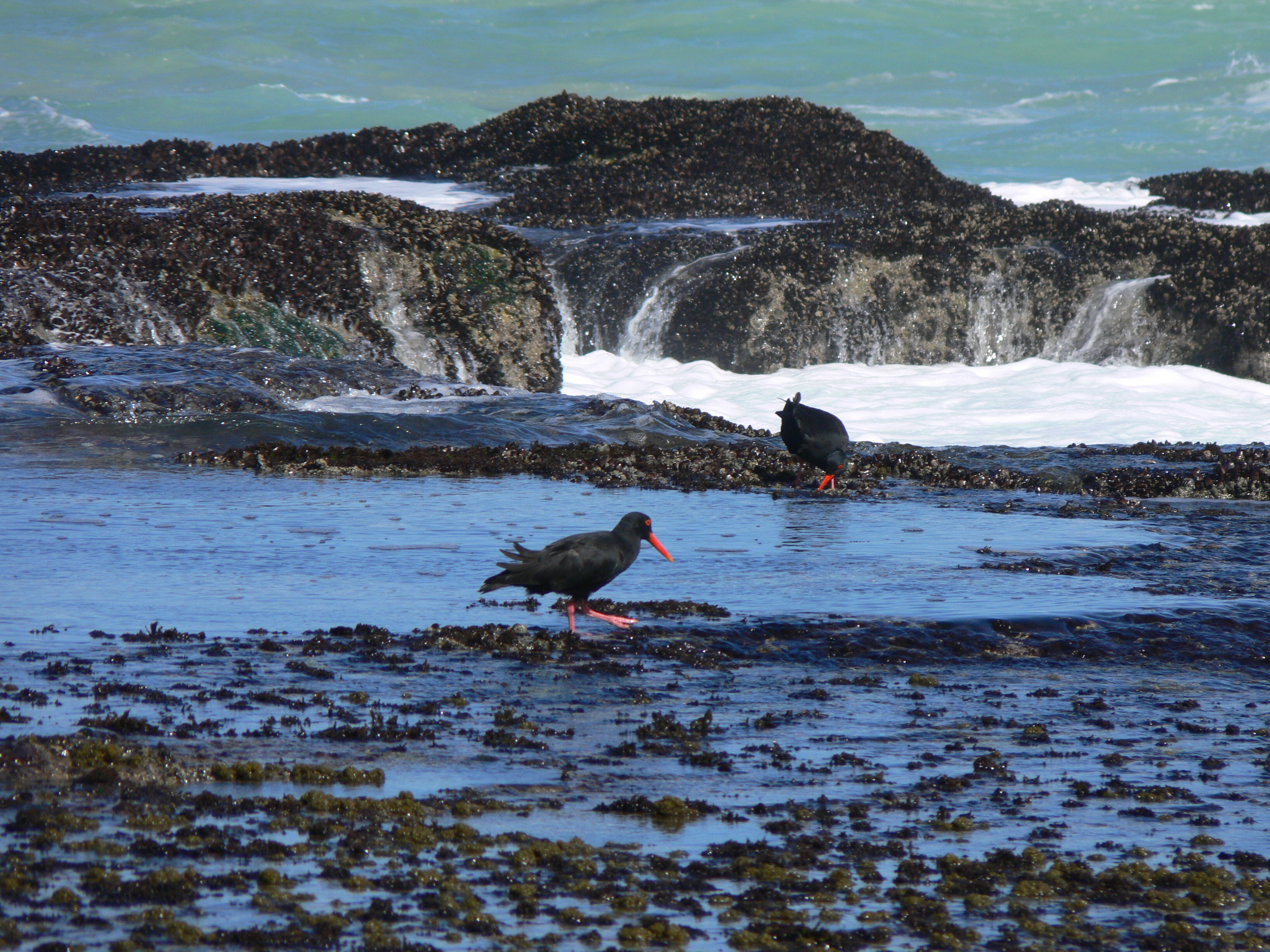
- African black oystercatchers at De Hoop
- Location of De Hoop Nature Reserve
- Location: Western Cape, South Africa
- Nearest city: Bredasdorp
- Coordinates: 34°26′3″S 20°32′52″E
- Area: 34,000 ha (84,000 acres)
- Established: 1957
- Governing body: CapeNature
- Website: De Hoop Nature Reserve

Ramsar Wetland
- Official name: De Hoop Vlei
- Designated: 12 March 1975
- Reference no.: 34
- De Hoop Nature Reserve (South Africa) De Hoop Nature Reserve (Western Cape)

De Hoop Nature Reserve is a nature reserve in the Western Cape Province of South Africa.

It lies three hours from Cape Town in the Overberg region, near Cape Agulhas, the southern tip of Africa. Approximately 340 square kilometres (130 sq mi) in area, it is one of the largest natural areas managed by CapeNature.

De Hoop is one of the components of the "Cape Floral Region Protected Areas" World Heritage Site.

The De Hoop Marine Protected Area extends three nautical miles out to sea from the coastline of the nature reserve.

== History ==
In the mid twentieth-century, the South African government bought the farms De Hoop and Windhoek with the intention to establish a wildlife farm for endangered species. In the mid 1970s, the area became dedicated to the conservation of the Cape Floral ecosystem, and became the southernmost nature reserve in Africa.

It was declared a UNESCO World Heritage Site in 2004.

== Climate ==
De Hoop Nature Reserve's climate is Mediterranean, with warm summers and mild winters. The reserve gets 380 mm of rain annually. August is the wettest month. In summer, winds blow in from the east, west and southeast, whereas winter has westerly and southwesterly winds.

== Vegetation ==
The vegetation De Hoop Nature Reserve is part of the world's smallest and most threatened plant kingdom, known as the Cape Floral Kingdom. The reserve also contains one of the largest areas of the rare lowland fynbos.

== Animals ==
De Hoop is haven for both terrestrial and marine animals. Numerous species inhabit these habitats. The reserve has a total of 86 mammal species. These include the rare bontebok and Cape mountain zebra, eland, grey rhebok, chacma baboon, yellow mongoose and caracal. Leopard, although rare, are also found in the reserve.

The waters within the De Hoop Reserve support good populations of marine mammals such as dolphins and seals. The bays of De Hoop are the breeding grounds for southern right whales. The marine protected area of the reserve has a total of 250 species of fish.

== Birds ==
De Hoop supports a large number of resident and migratory bird species. The reserve's total bird species count is 260. Several water birds breed in the reserve. The reserve is also home to the only remaining breeding colony in the Western Cape of the rare Cape vulture.

== Missile Testing ==
The eastern part of the reserve is occasionally used by the Denel Overberg Test Range for missile testing. There is no danger to hikers as the reserve closes the area well before the testing date.

== Gallery ==
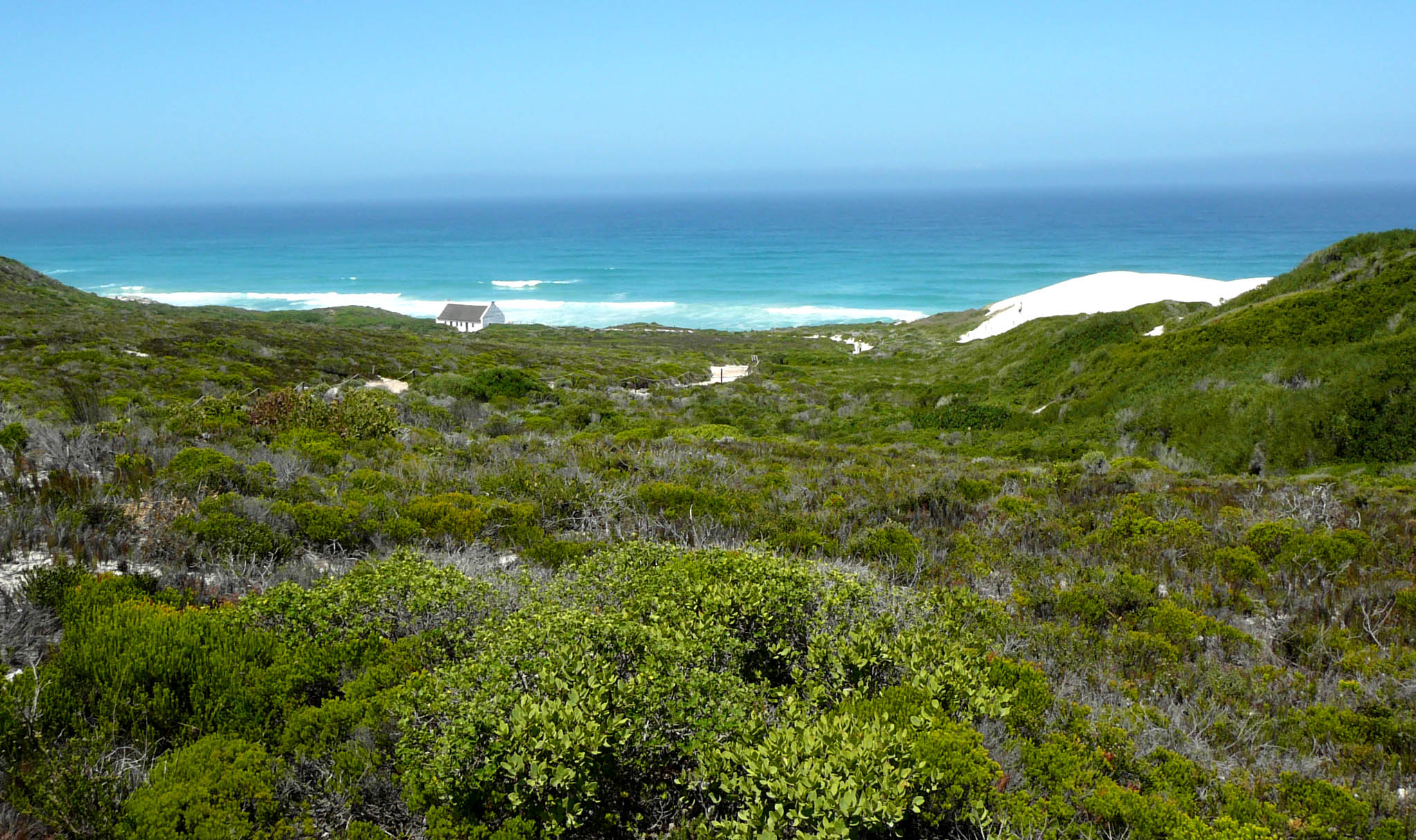
De Hoop Nature Reserve

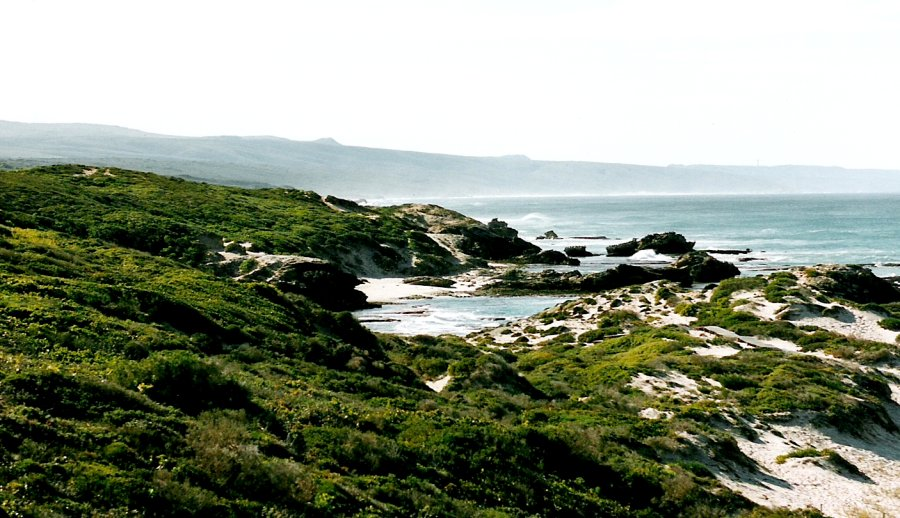
A beach in the De Hoop Nature Reserve

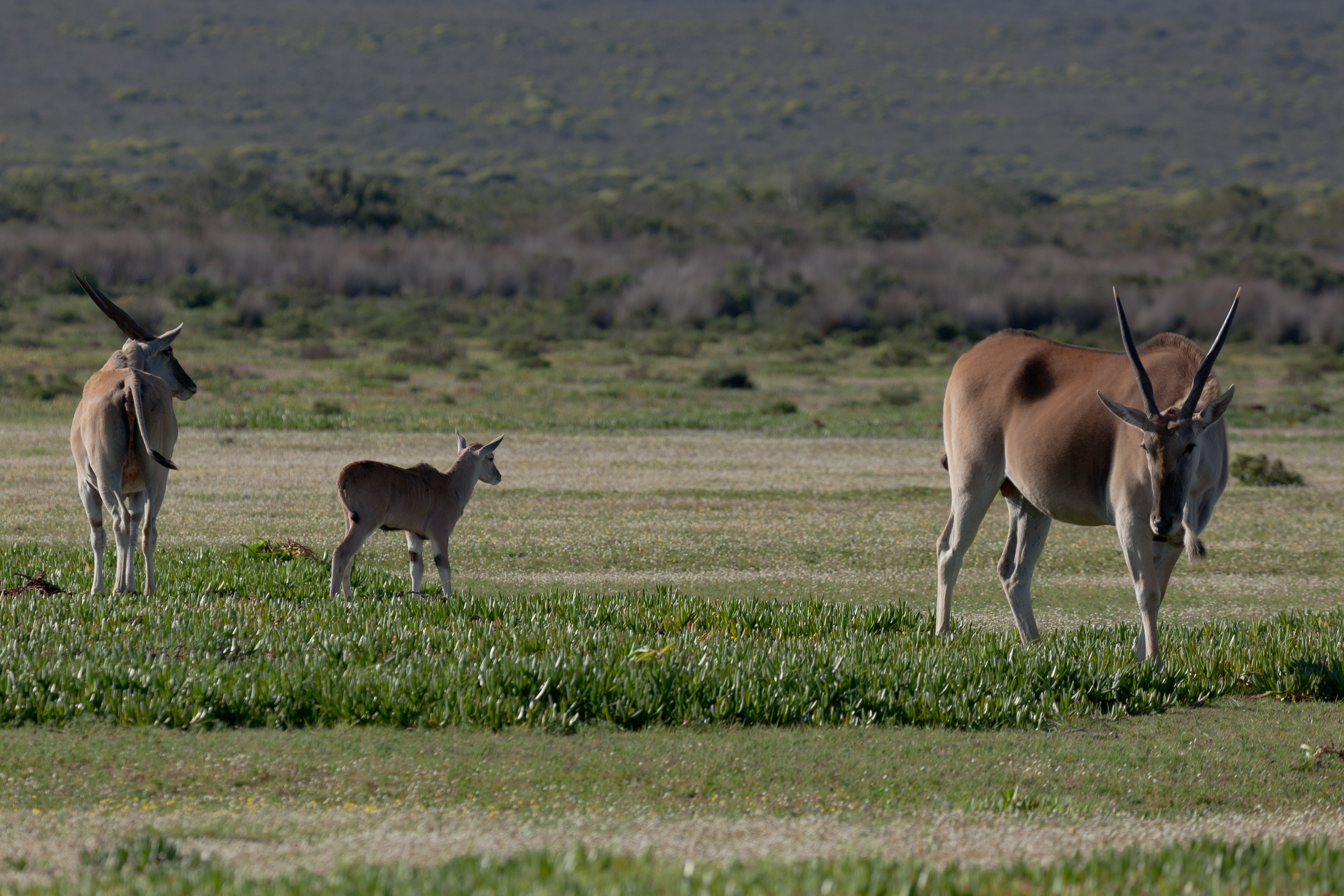
Common eland, with a calf

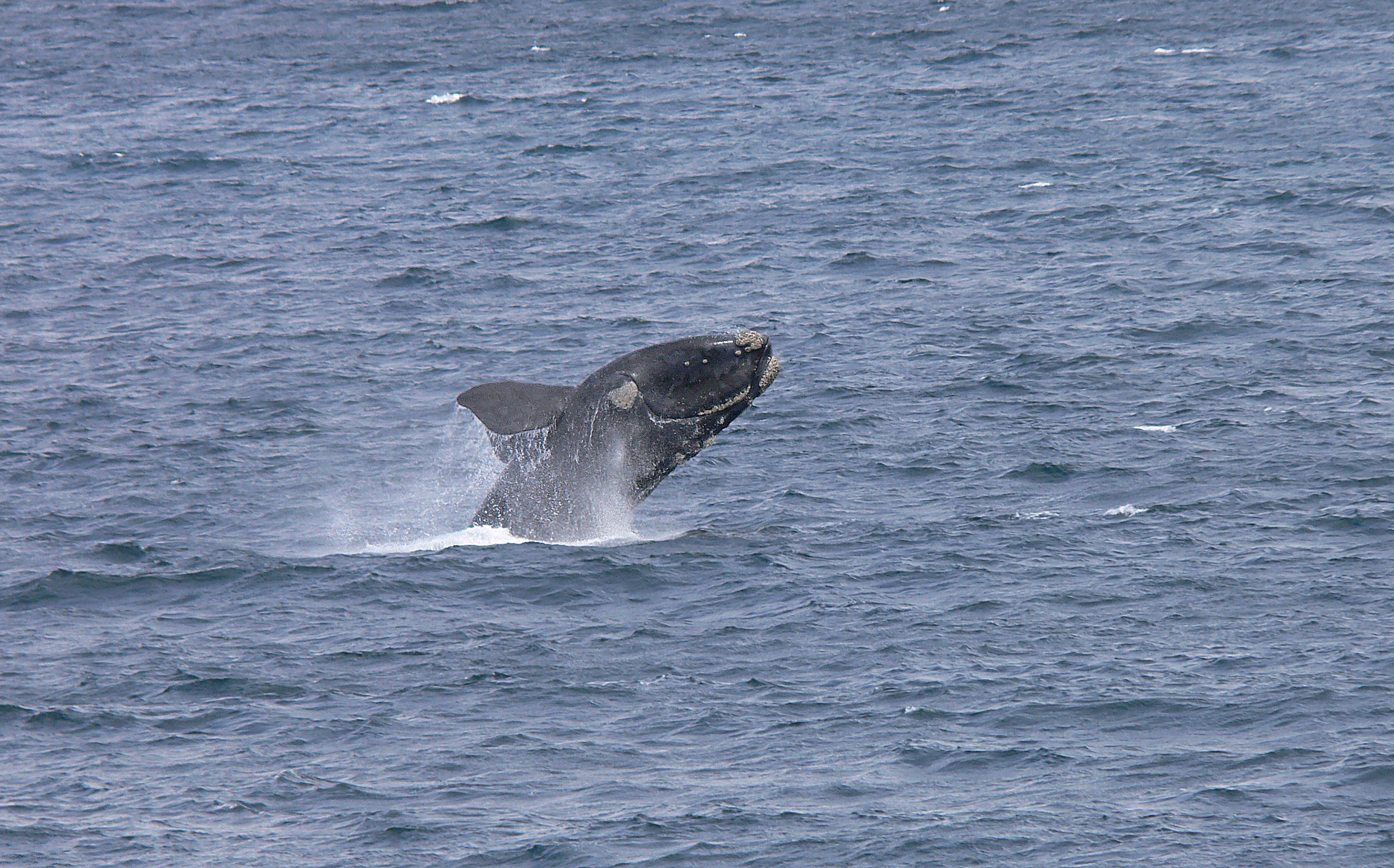
A southern right whale breaching at De Hoop Nature Reserve

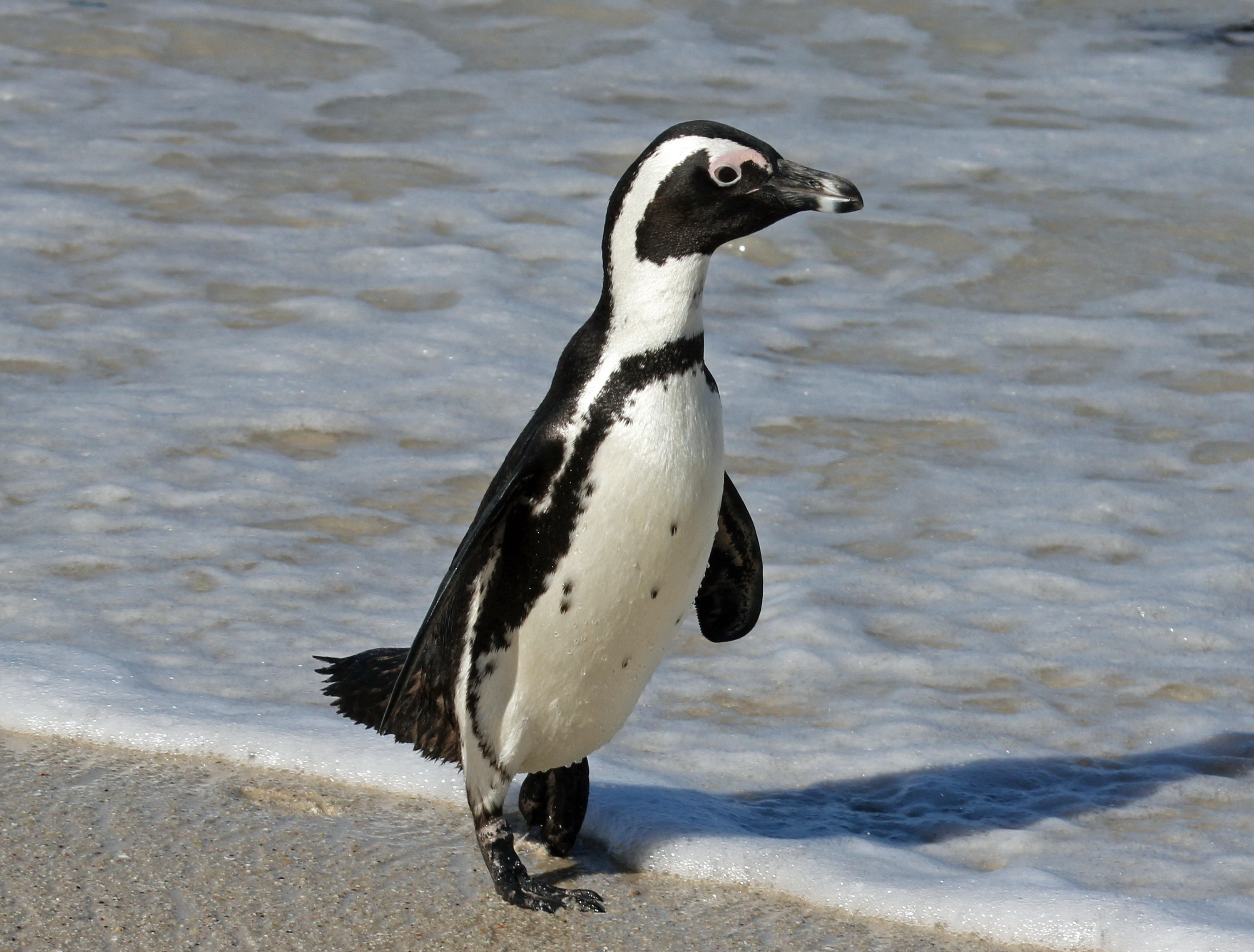
African penguin

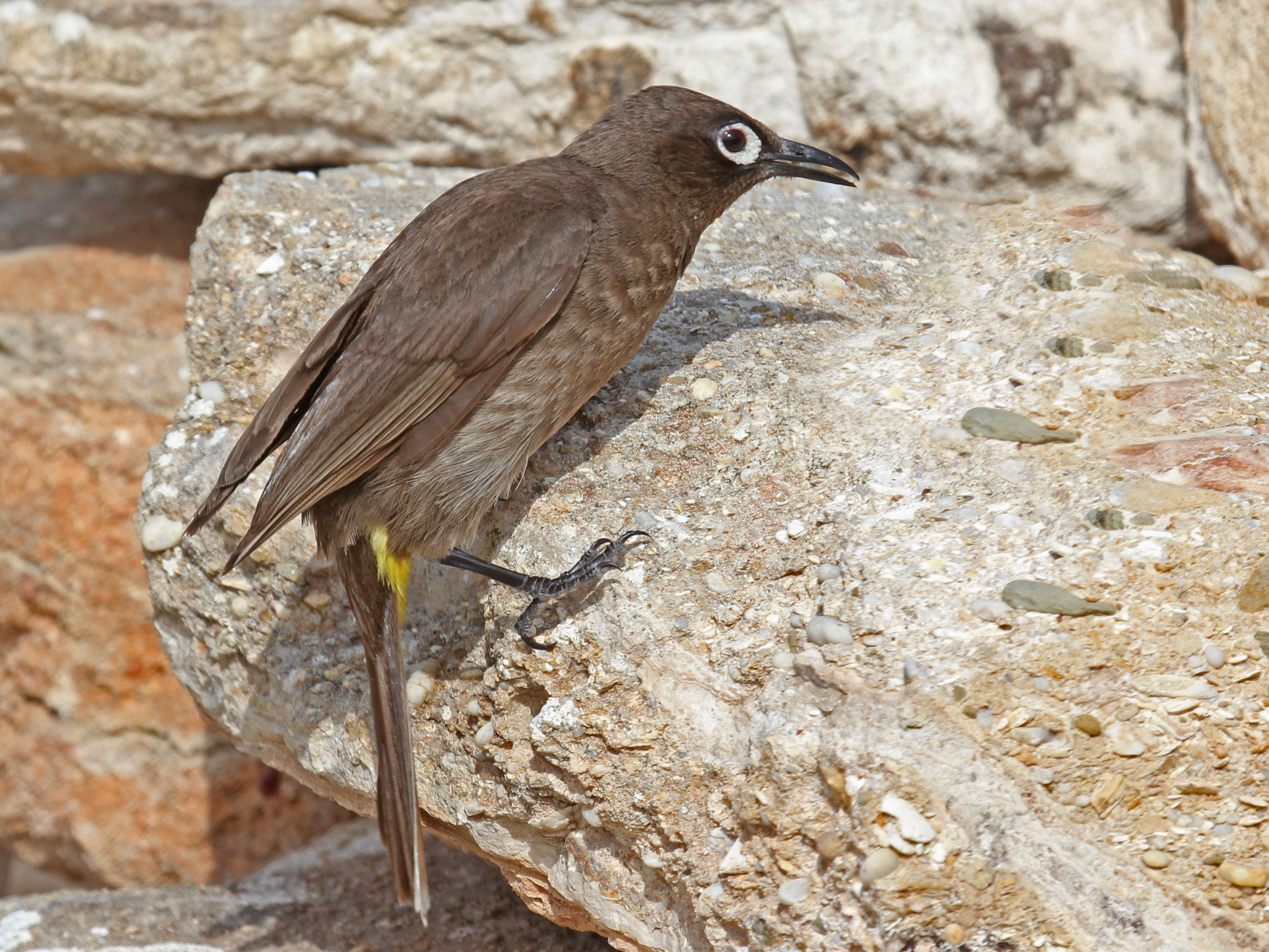
Cape bulbul

== See also ==
- CapeNature
- Protected areas of South Africa
