= Knersvlakte =

Succulent Karoo bioregion in South Africa

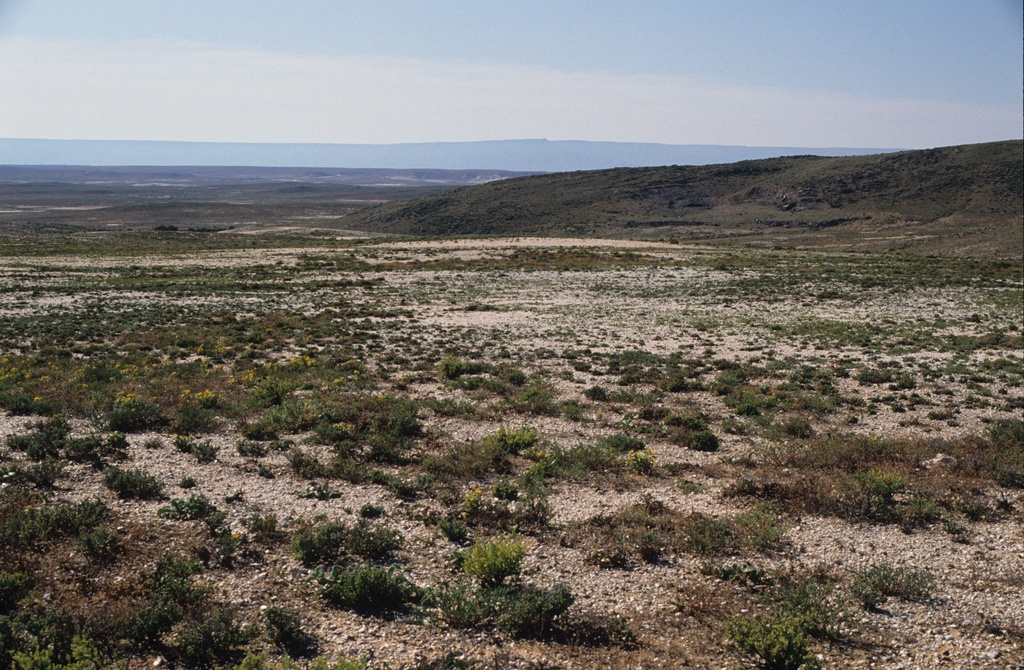
The quartz strewn landscape of the Knersvlakte.

The Knersvlakte is a region of hilly terrain covered with quartz gravel in Namaqualand in the north-west corner of the Western Cape Province of South Africa. The name, literally "gnashing plain" in Afrikaans, is thought to be derived from the crunching of wagonwheels as they moved over the hard quartz stones.

The Knersvlakte is a Succulent Karoo and dominated by leaf succulents belonging to the Aizoaceae and Crassulaceae, with a variety of shrubs spread amongst them. The climate of the region is semi-arid with long dry summers, and rainfall occurring in the winter months.

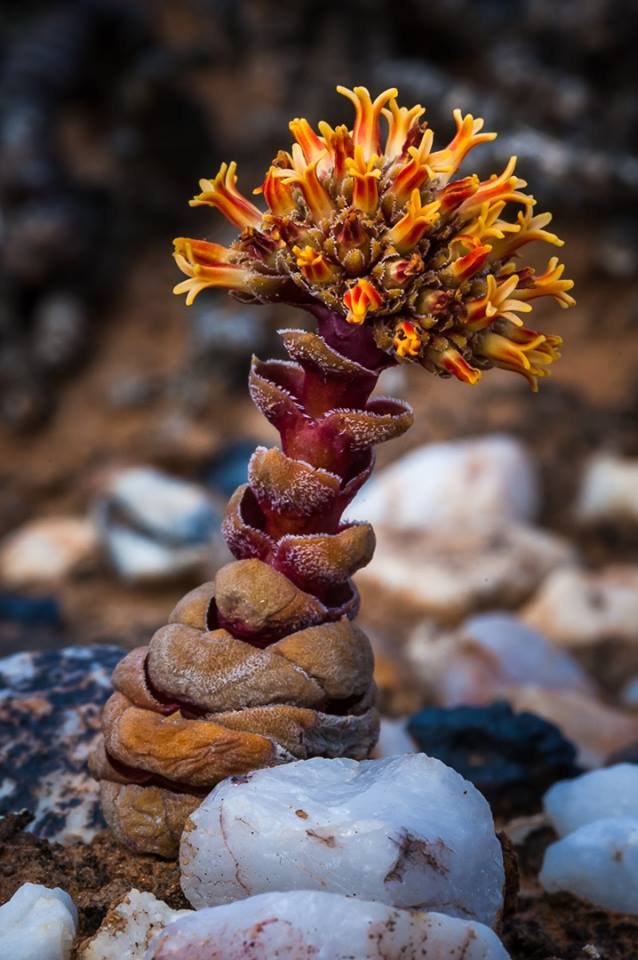
Crassula columnaris, a succulent plant native to the Knersvlakte

The white quartz gravel reflects the sunlight, and is not as hot as the darker rocks and soil found in adjacent areas. Because the area is isolated from other areas with abundant quartz stones, there is a high level of endemism in the plants that occur in the Knersvlakte. Many of these plants are small and compact, which is presumably an adaptation to absorb heat as rain occurs in a short and cool winter period.

The Knersvlakte Nature Reserve was established in 2014 by CapeNature and the World Wide Fund for Nature to protect the endemic vegetation of the Knersvlakte.
