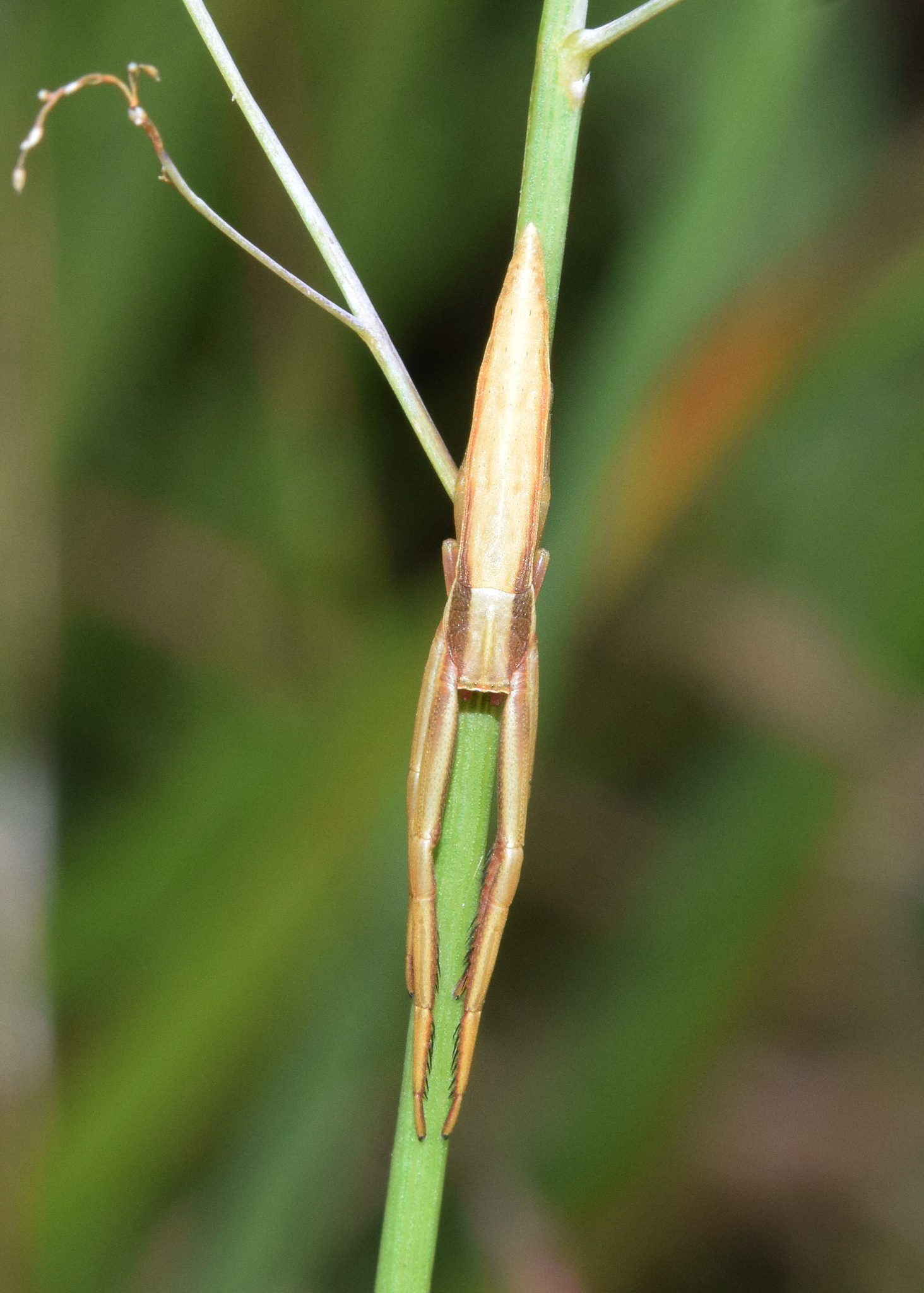

Scientific classification
- Kingdom: Animalia
- Phylum: Arthropoda
- Subphylum: Chelicerata
- Class: Arachnida
- Order: Araneae
- Infraorder: Araneomorphae
- Family: Thomisidae
- Genus: Runcinia
- Species: R. johnstoni

Binomial name
- Runcinia johnstoni Lessert, 1919

Synonyms
- Runcinia sjöstedti Lessert, 1919

= Runcinia johnstoni =

Tailed Runcinia Grass Crab Spider

Species of spider

Runcinia johnstoni is a species of spider in the family Thomisidae. It is commonly known as the tailed Runcinia grass crab spider and has a wide distribution throughout Africa.

== Distribution ==
Runcinia johnstoni is known from Senegal, Ivory Coast, Democratic Republic of the Congo, Tanzania, Zimbabwe, and South Africa.

In South Africa, the species has been recorded from seven provinces.

== Habitat and ecology ==
Runcinia johnstoni are free-living on plants in Forest, Fynbos, Grassland, Indian Ocean Coastal Belt, Nama Karoo, and Savanna biomes, at altitudes ranging from 178 to 1,842 m.
