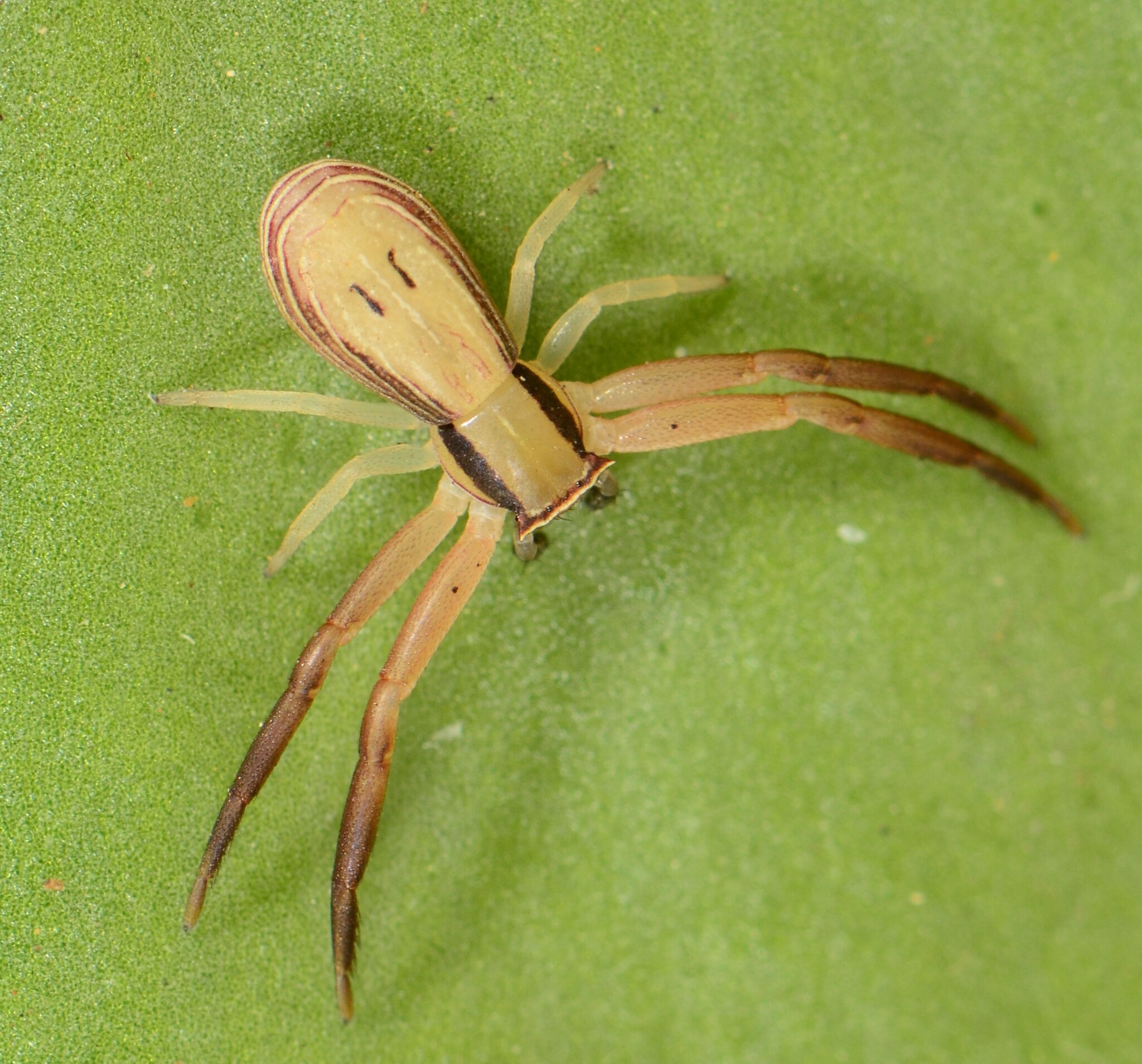

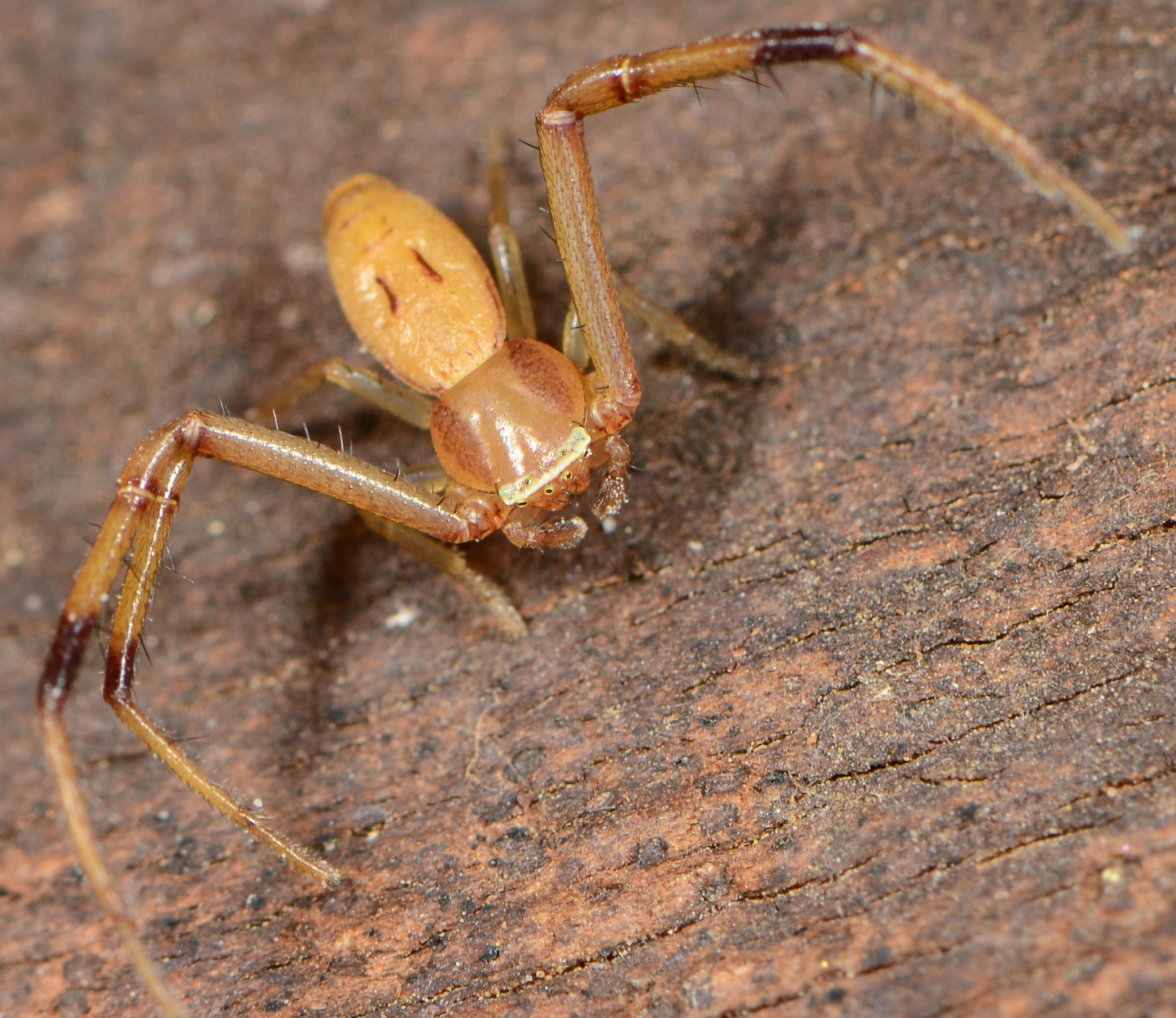

Scientific classification
- Kingdom: Animalia
- Phylum: Arthropoda
- Subphylum: Chelicerata
- Class: Arachnida
- Order: Araneae
- Infraorder: Araneomorphae
- Family: Thomisidae
- Genus: Runcinia
- Species: R. depressa

Binomial name
- Runcinia depressa Simon, 1906

= Runcinia depressa =

Flat Runcinia Grass Crab Spider

Species of spider

Runcinia depressa is a species of spider in the family Thomisidae. It is commonly known as the flat Runcinia grass crab spider and has a wide distribution throughout Africa.

== Distribution ==
Runcinia depressa occurs throughout Africa.

In South Africa, the species has been recorded from all provinces except Eastern Cape. It has been found at Roodeplaatdam Nature Reserve, Ndumo Nature Reserve, Hluhluwe Nature Reserve, Mosdene Nature Reserve, and Loskop Dam Nature Reserve.

== Habitat and ecology ==
Runcinia depressa are free-living on plants and very common grass dwellers.

The species has been sampled from Fynbos, Grassland, Savanna, Indian Ocean Coastal Belt, and Nama Karoo biomes at altitudes ranging from 4 to 1,560 m. It has also been collected from pistachio orchards, potatoes, sugar cane, and strawberry fields.

== Description ==
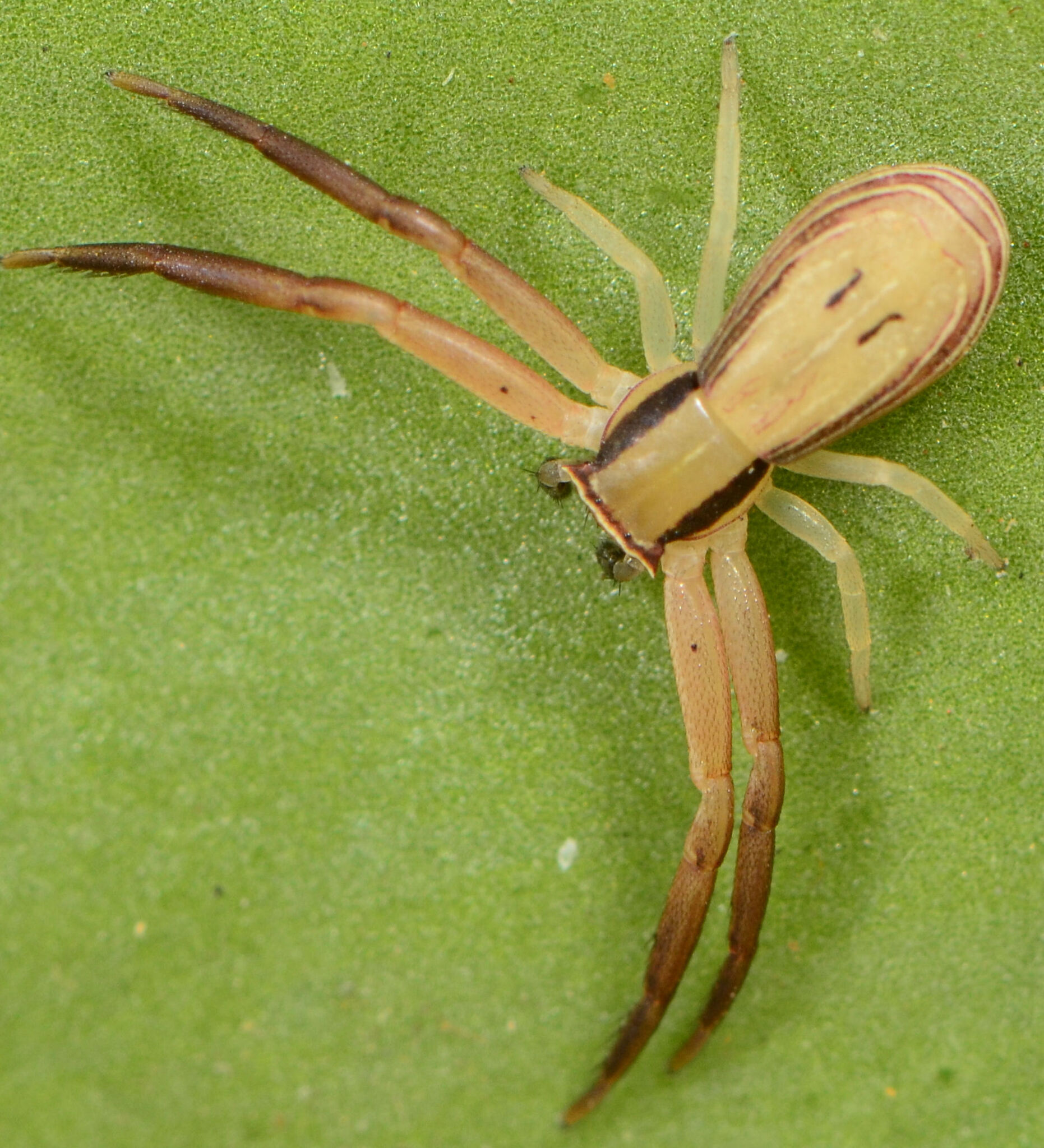
female

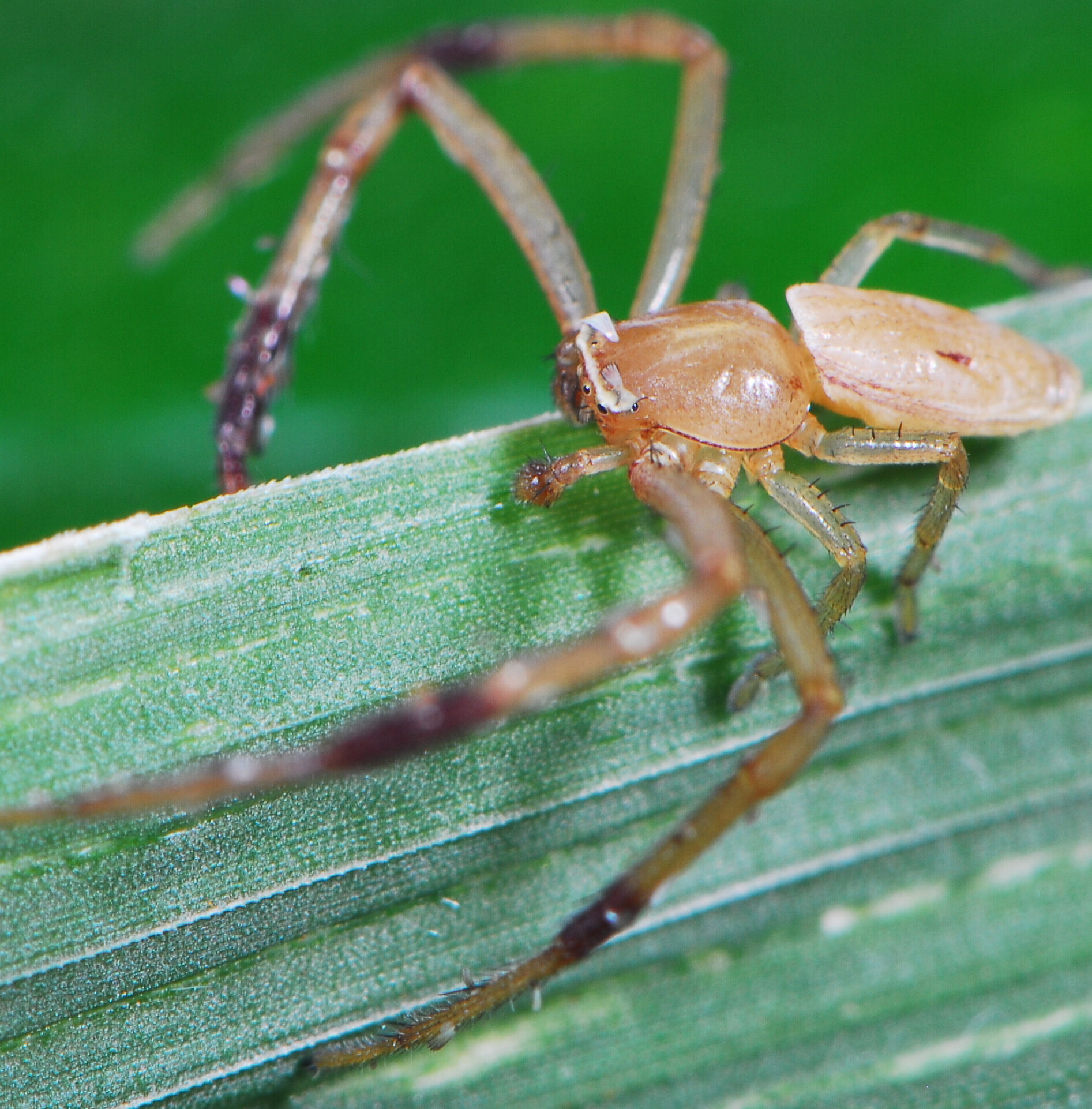
male

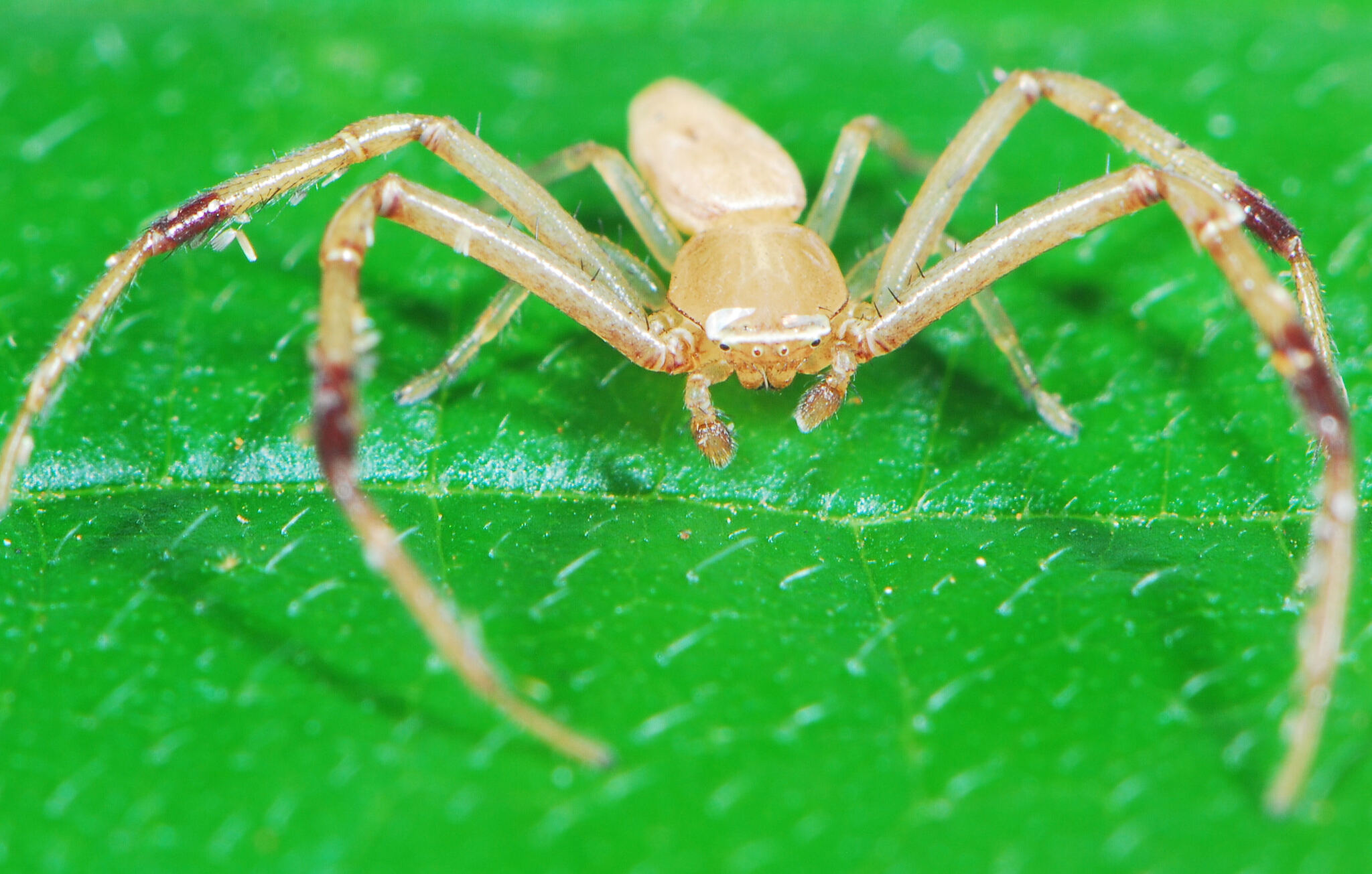
male

== Conservation ==
Runcinia depressa is listed as Least Concern due to its wide geographical range. The species is protected in several reserves including Roodeplaatdam Nature Reserve, Ndumo Nature Reserve, Hluhluwe Nature Reserve, Mosdene Nature Reserve, and Loskop Dam Nature Reserve.

== Taxonomy ==
Runcinia depressa was described by Eugène Simon in 1906 from Sudan. The species was revised by Dippenaar-Schoeman in 1980 and 1983 and is known from both sexes.
