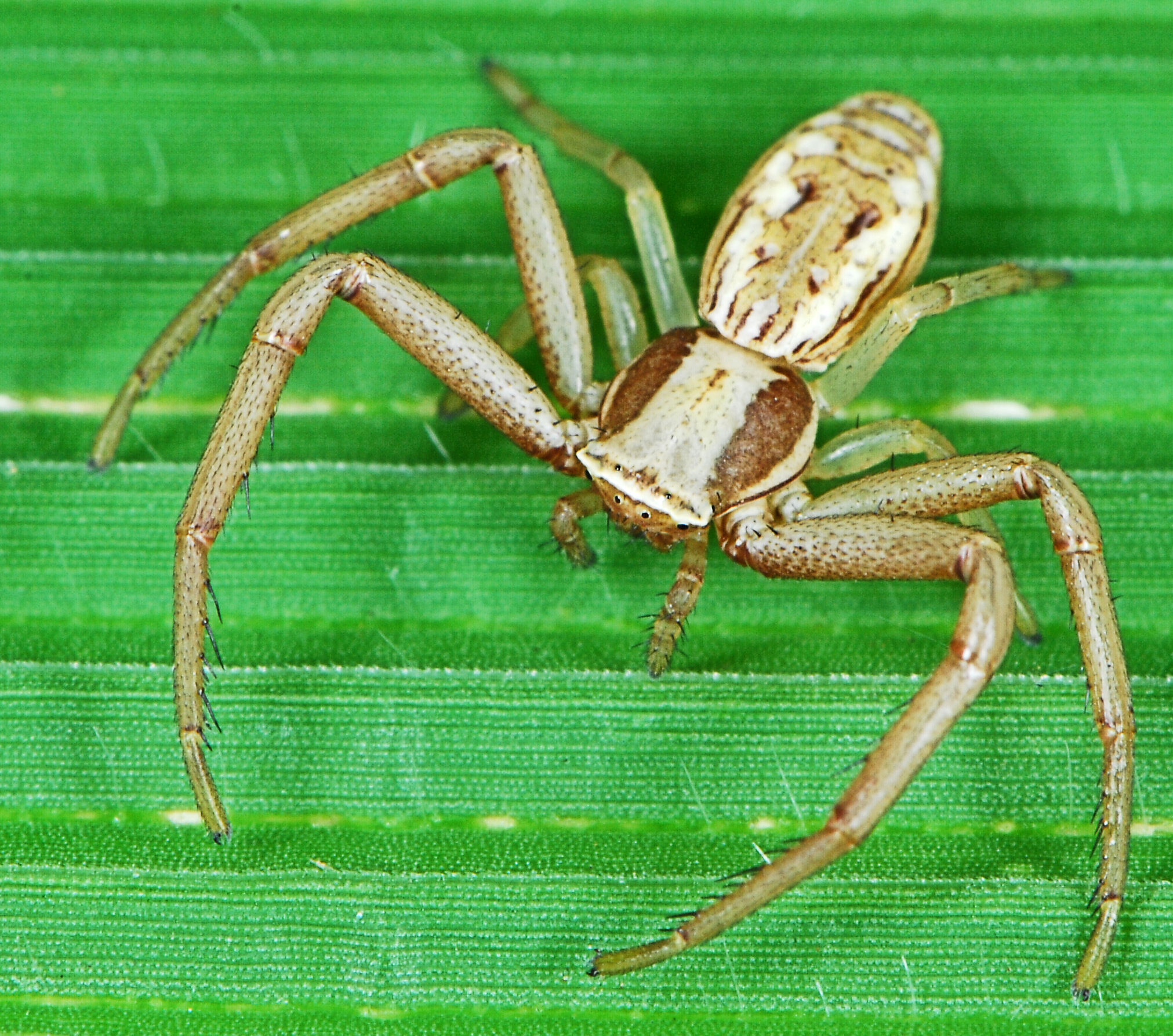
- female
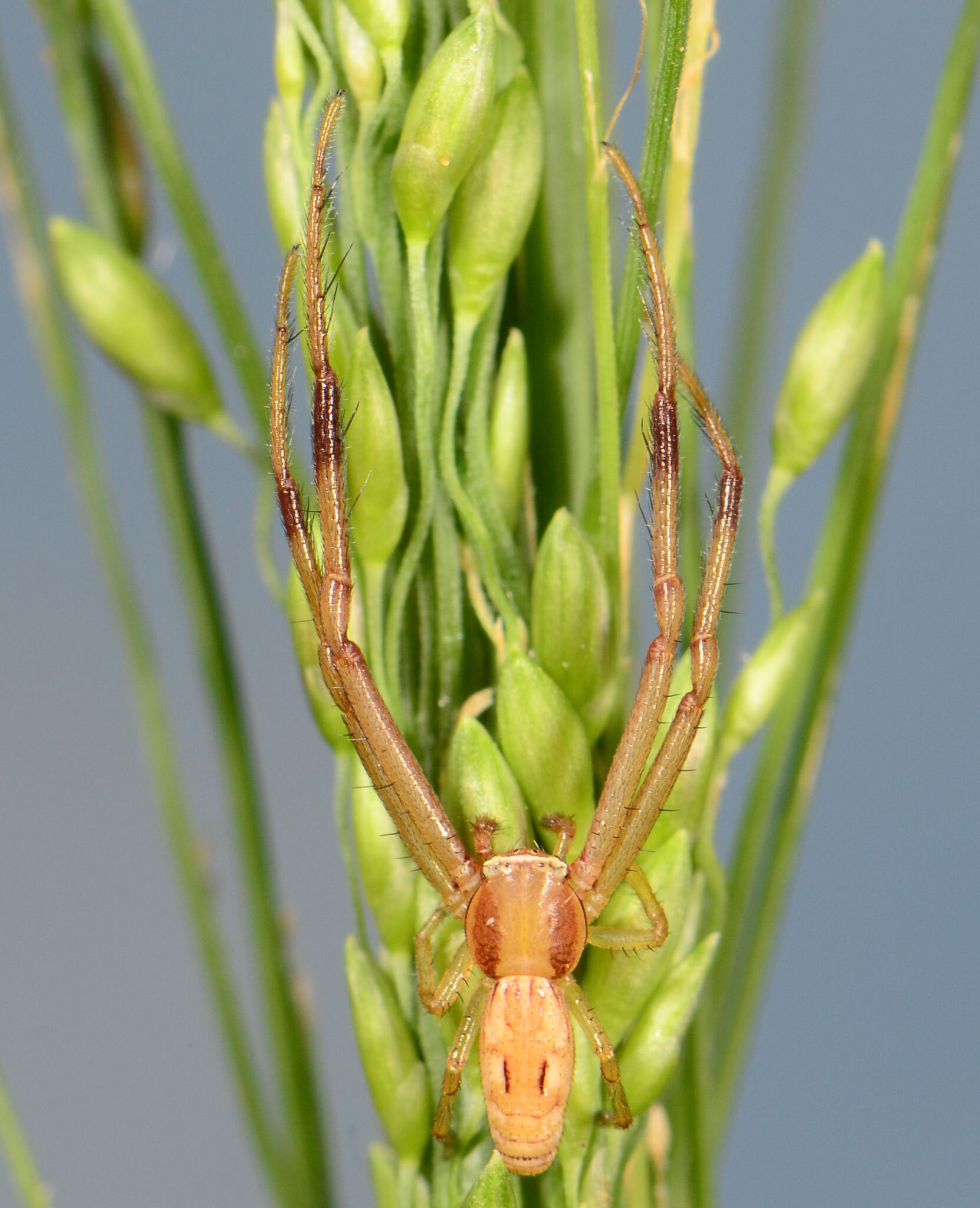
- male

Scientific classification
- Kingdom: Animalia
- Phylum: Arthropoda
- Subphylum: Chelicerata
- Class: Arachnida
- Order: Araneae
- Infraorder: Araneomorphae
- Family: Thomisidae
- Genus: Runcinia
- Species: R. erythrina

Binomial name
- Runcinia erythrina Jézéquel, 1964

= Runcinia erythrina =

Round-head Runcinia Grass Crab Spider

Species of spider

Runcinia erythrina is a species of spider in the family Thomisidae. It is commonly known as the round-head Runcinia grass crab spider and occurs in several African countries.

== Distribution ==
Runcinia erythrina is known from Ivory Coast, Zimbabwe, and South Africa.

In South Africa, the species has been recorded from all provinces except Northern Cape.

== Habitat and ecology ==
Runcinia erythrina are free-living on plants and commonly found on grass.

The species has been sampled from all floral biomes except the Desert and Succulent Karoo biomes, at altitudes ranging from 6 to 2,785 m. It has also been sampled from the crop kenaf.

Males have been found in December and females from October to May.

== Description ==
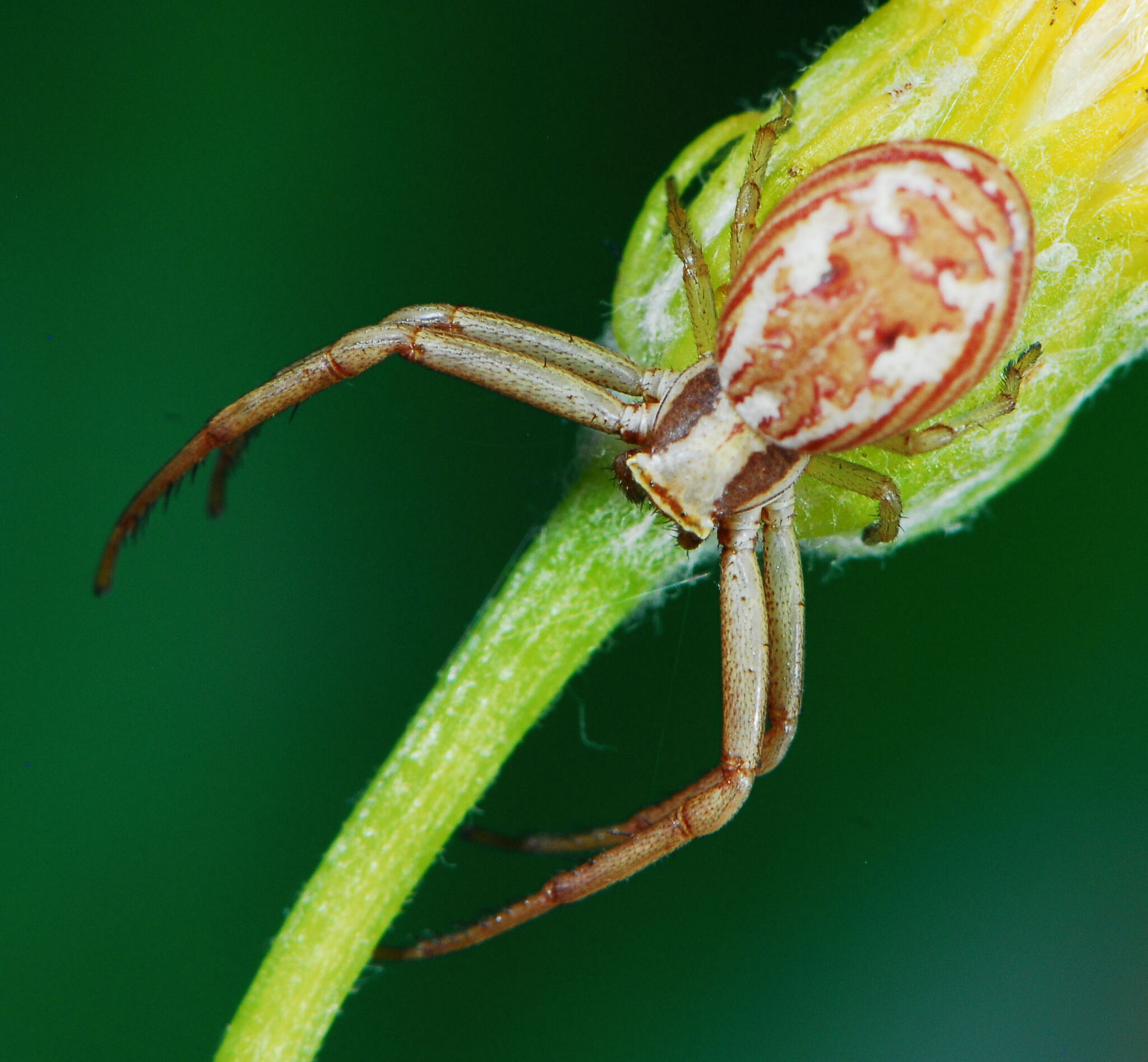
female

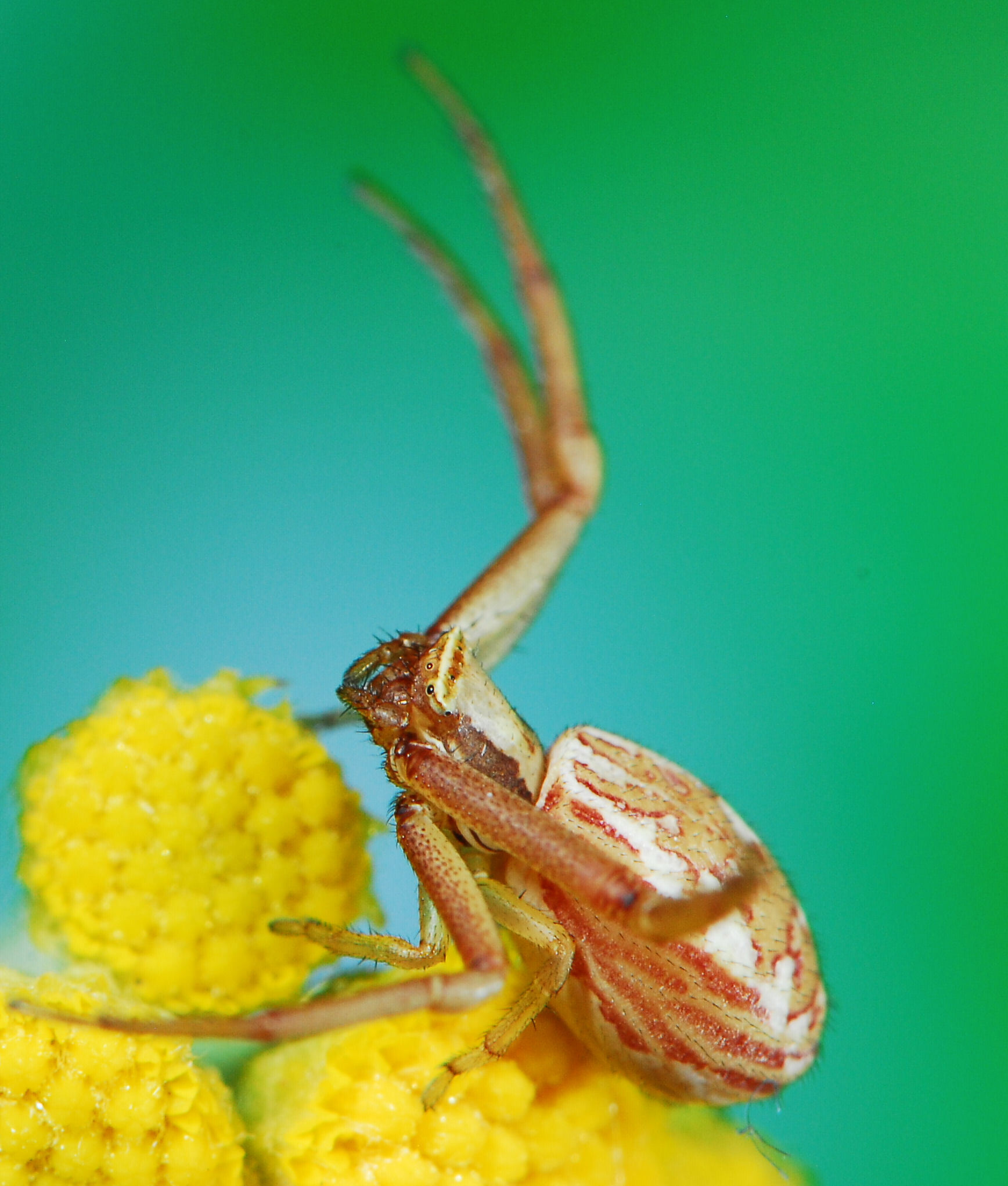
female

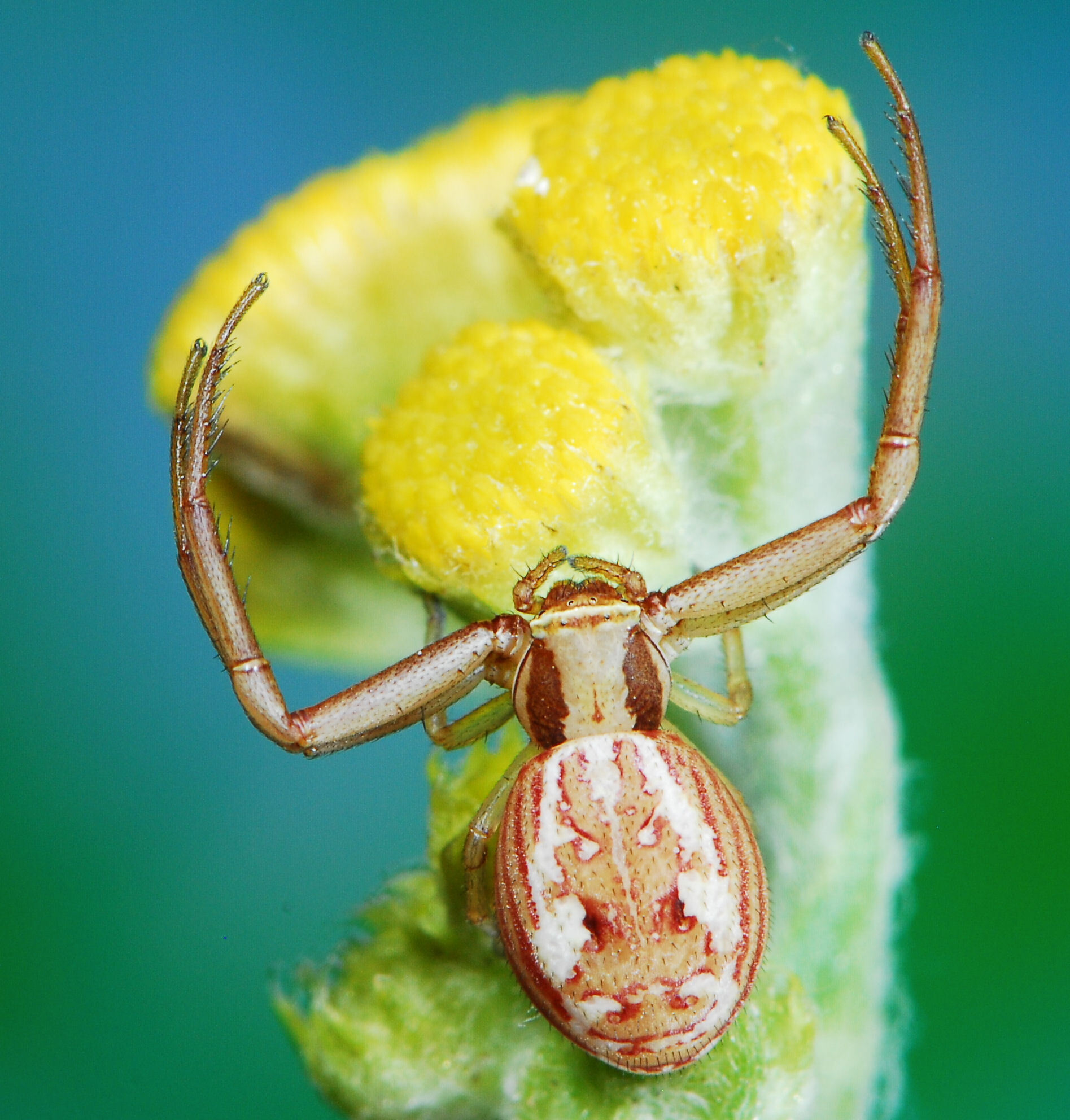
female

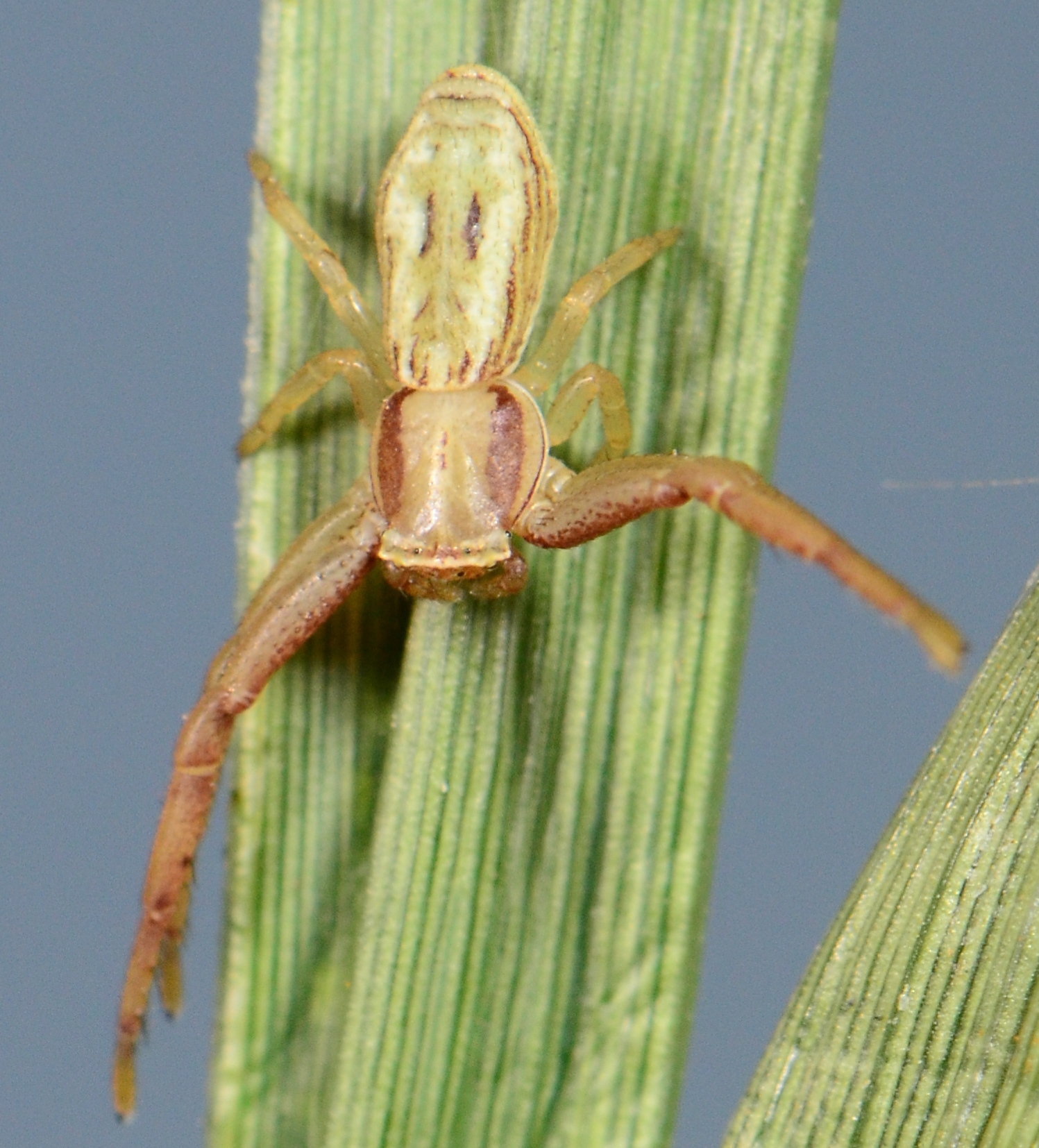
female

== Conservation ==
Runcinia erythrina is listed as Least Concern due to its wide geographical range. The species is protected in more than eighteen protected areas throughout South Africa.

== Taxonomy ==
Runcinia erythrina was described by Jézéquel in 1964 from the Ivory Coast. The species was revised by Dippenaar-Schoeman in 1980 and 1983 and is known from both sexes.
