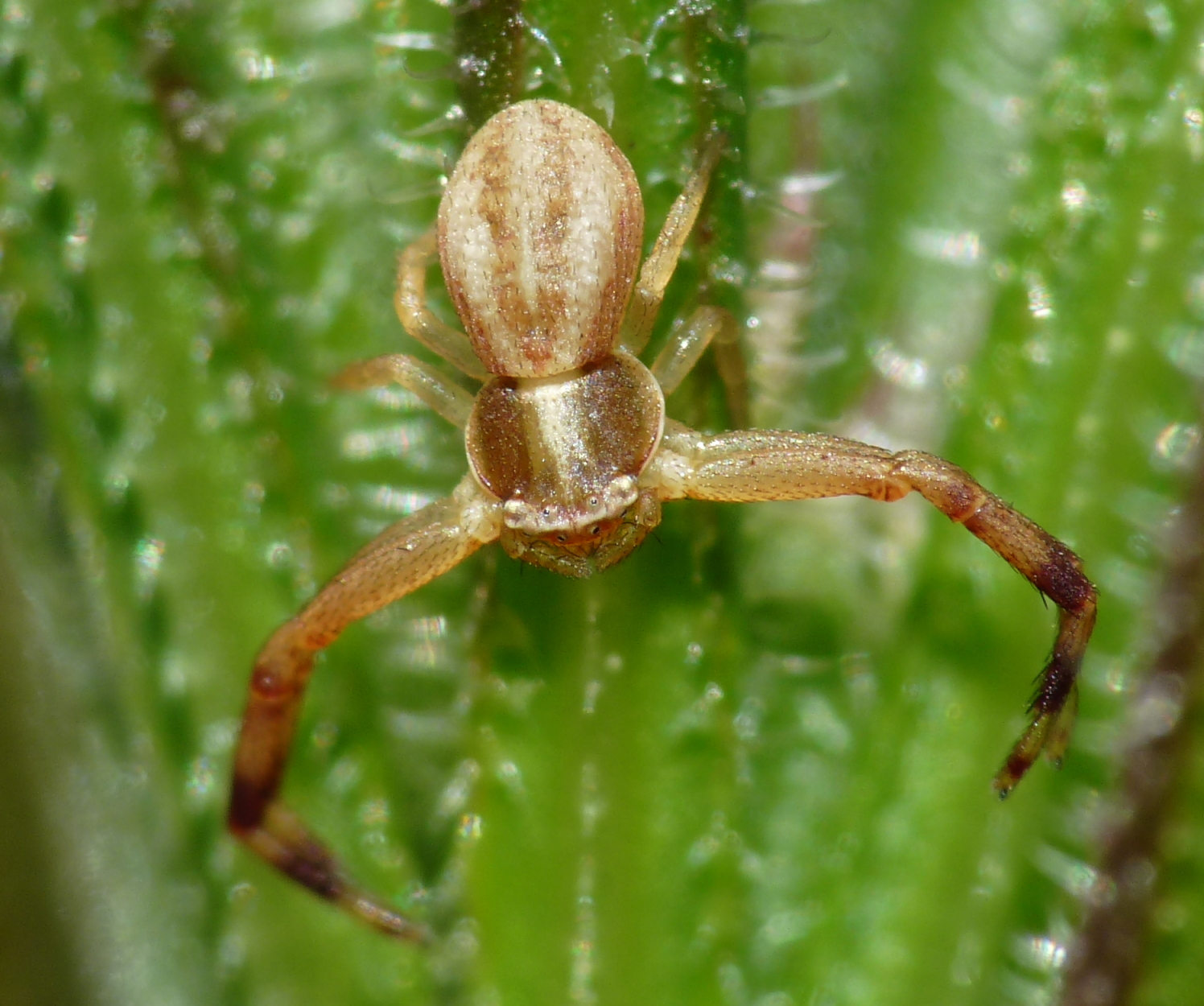

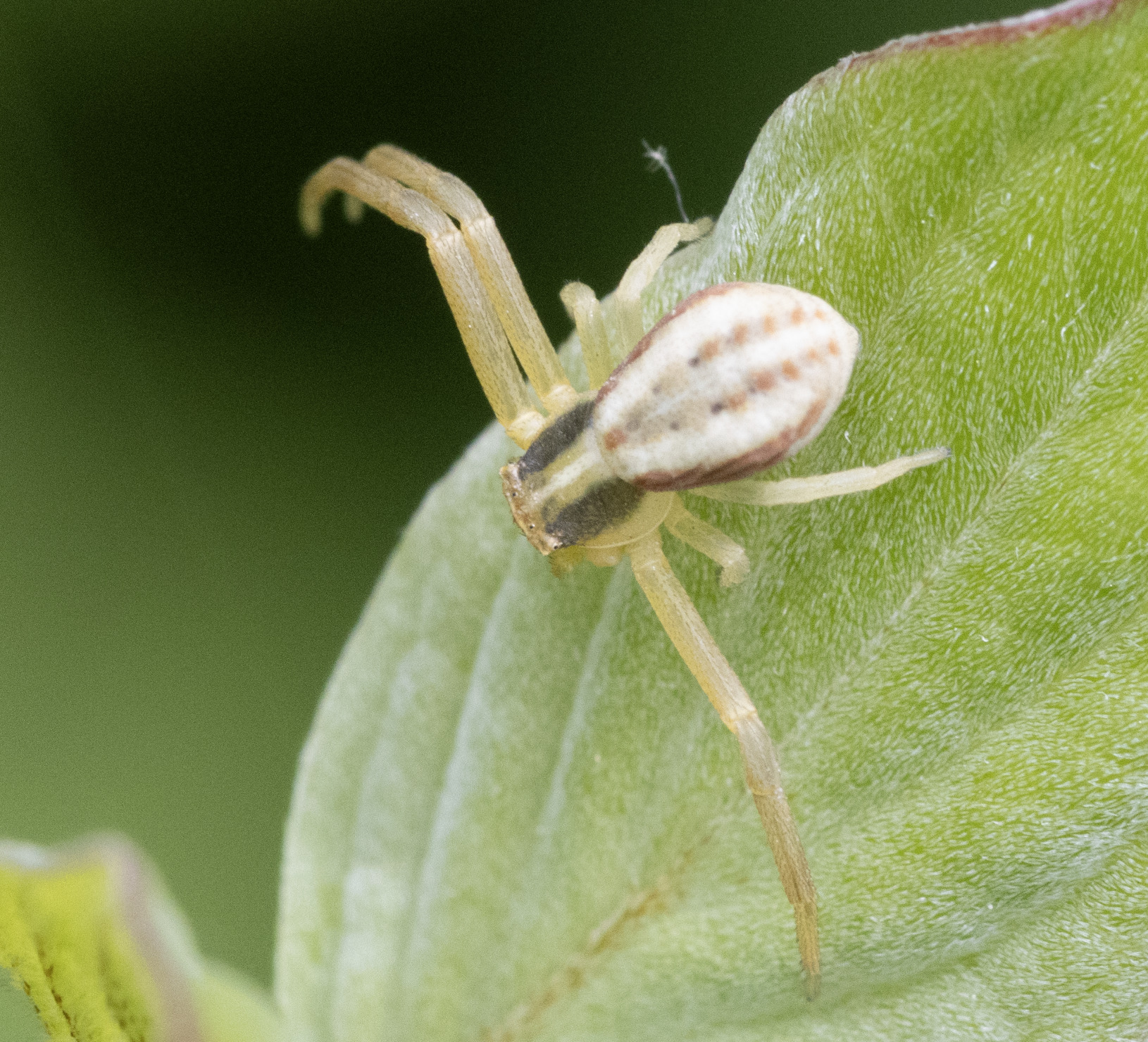

Scientific classification
- Kingdom: Animalia
- Phylum: Arthropoda
- Subphylum: Chelicerata
- Class: Arachnida
- Order: Araneae
- Infraorder: Araneomorphae
- Family: Thomisidae
- Genus: Runcinia
- Species: R. grammica

Binomial name
- Runcinia grammica (C. L. Koch, 1837)

Synonyms
- Thomisus lateralis C. L. Koch, 1837; Xysticus grammicus C. L. Koch, 1837; Thomisus cerinus C. L. Koch, 1845; Thomisus amoenus Blackwall, 1870; Runcinia lateralis Simon, 1875; Misumena lateralis Pavesi, 1878; Runcinia cerina Roewer, 1955

= Runcinia grammica =

European Runcinia Grass Crab Spider

Species of spider

Runcinia grammica is a species of crab spiders, first described by Carl Ludwig Koch in 1837.

== Distribution ==
This species is found in Europe and Asia.

Runcina grammica has reportedly been sighted in various areas of Southeastern Spain and Southwestern Portugal. They are also known to inhabit Armenia, Georgia, Azerbaijan, Caucasus, Italy, India, South Africa, St. Helena, Turkey, France, and in the Carpathian Basin. They are among the most common species of spiders in Portugal. They are one of the many species preserved at the Mountain Zebra National Park, in South Africa.

== Life style ==
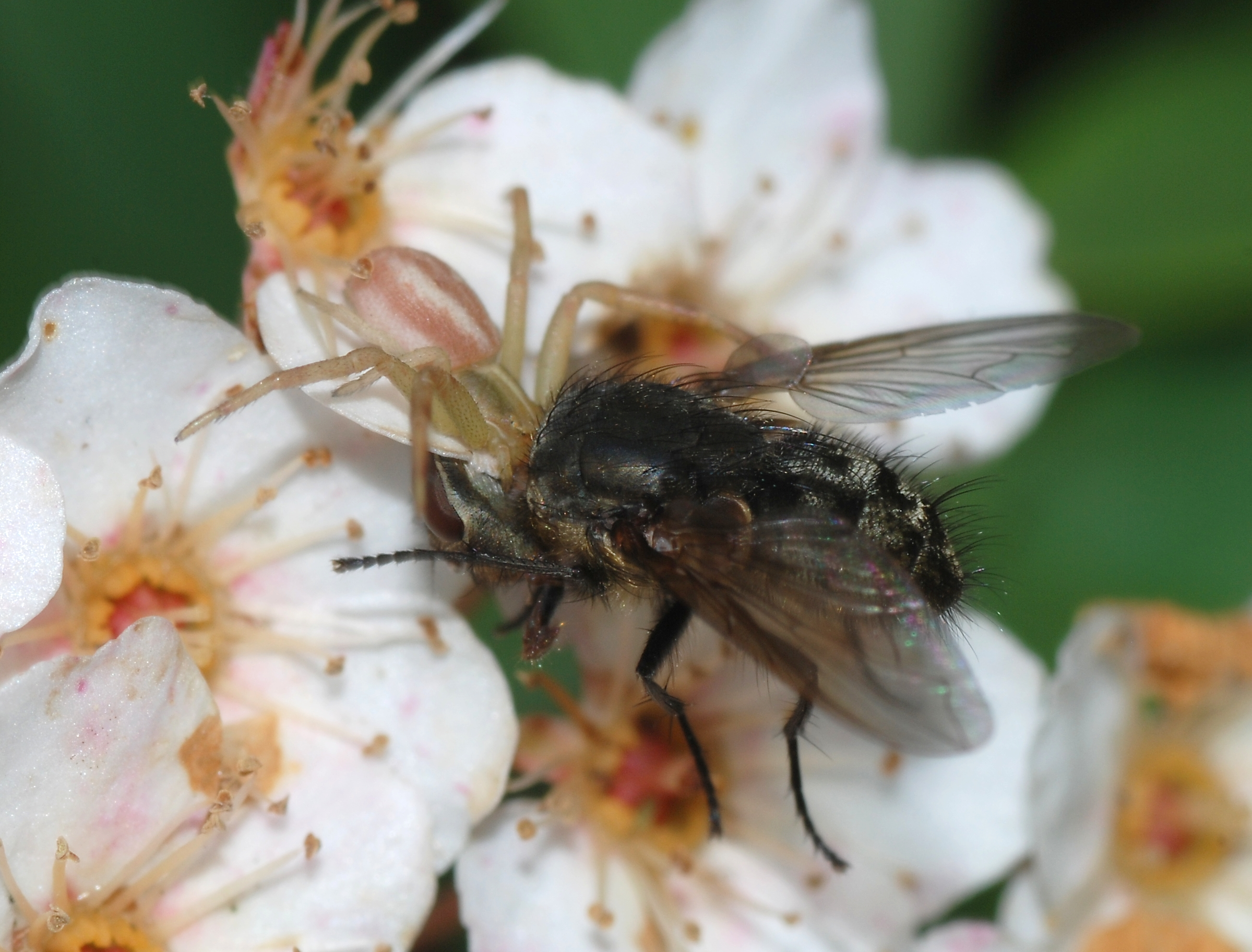
R grammica with prey

The species generally lives in peat bogs, fens, and meadows, although it has also been known to inhabit urban areas They usually mature to adulthood in the summer. They have short, broad bodies, which are covered in hair and spines. They have clear muscular corrugation on their sides, and, on small raised bumps on their heads, eight small eyes. Males are usually 2.5–3.5mm in length, females 4-6mm. They are predators, and eat various species of insects.

Unlike many spiders, they do not spin a web of any kind. Instead, they prowl on the ground, as well as climbing plants and flowers, to find their prey. They can move forwards, backwards, and sideways.
