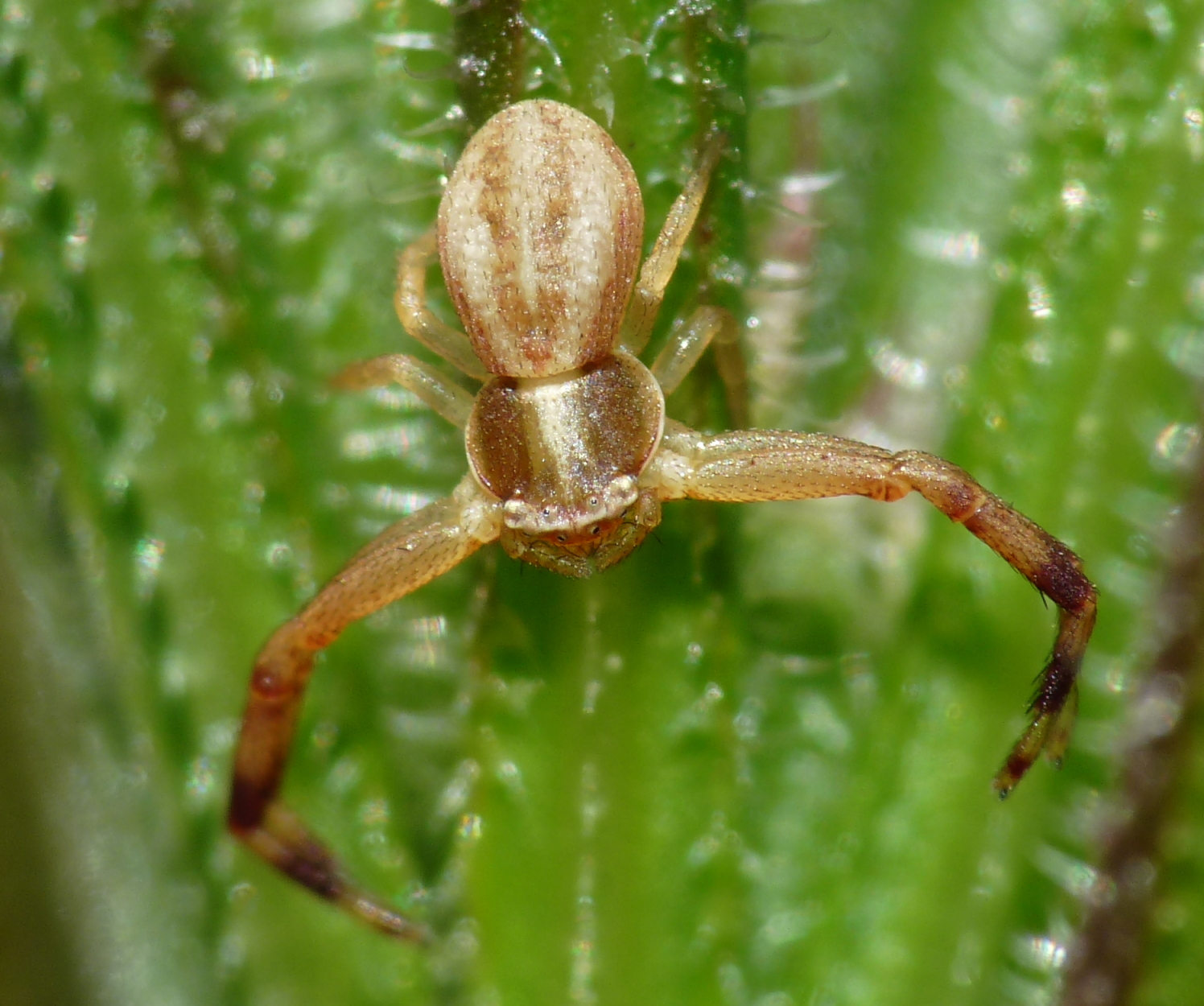
- R. grammica
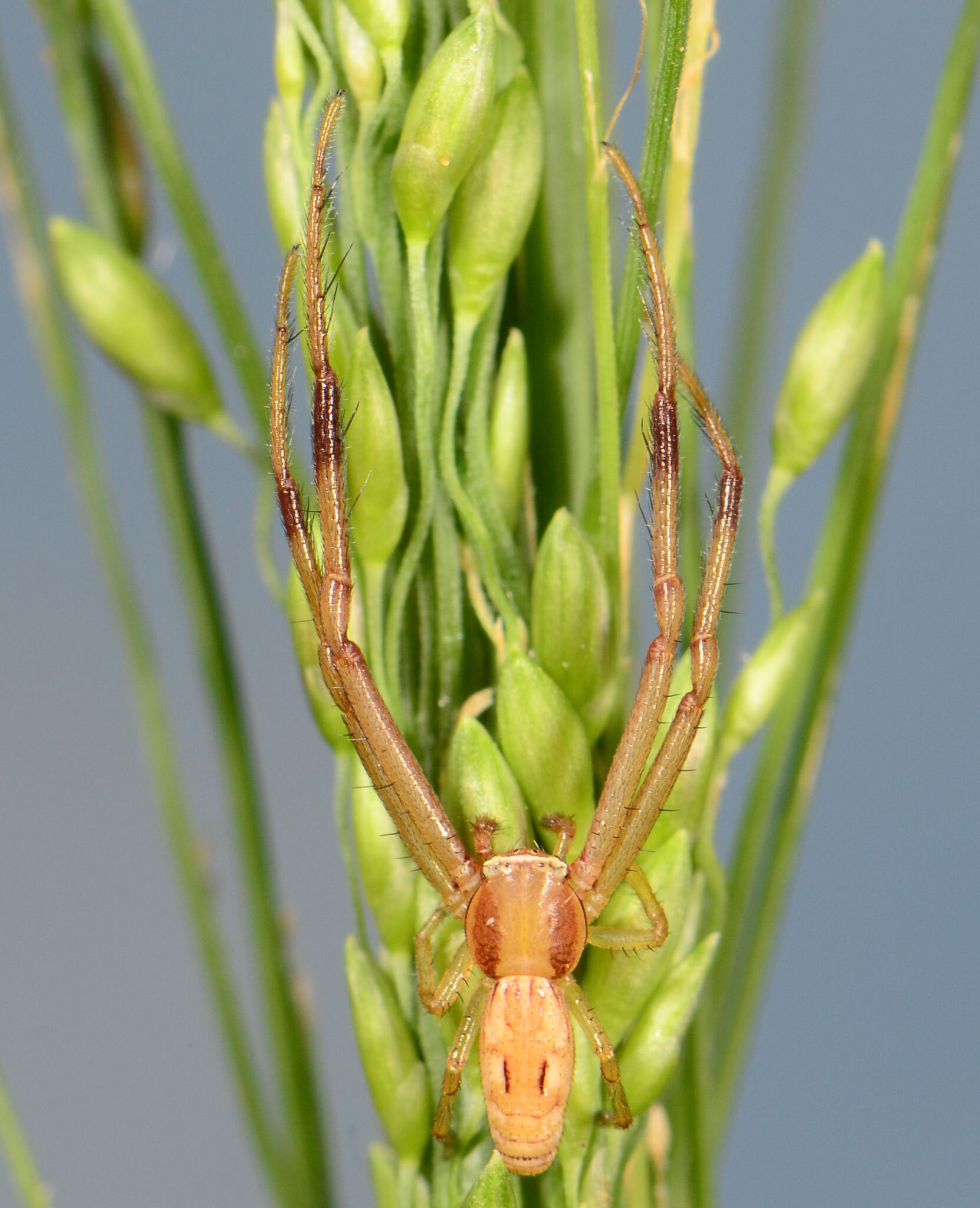
- male R. erythrina

Scientific classification
- Kingdom: Animalia
- Phylum: Arthropoda
- Subphylum: Chelicerata
- Class: Arachnida
- Order: Araneae
- Infraorder: Araneomorphae
- Family: Thomisidae
- Genus: Runcinia; Simon, 1875

Type species
- R. grammica (C. L. Koch, 1837)

Species
- 27, see text
- blue: reported countries (WSC)

= Runcinia =

Genus of spiders

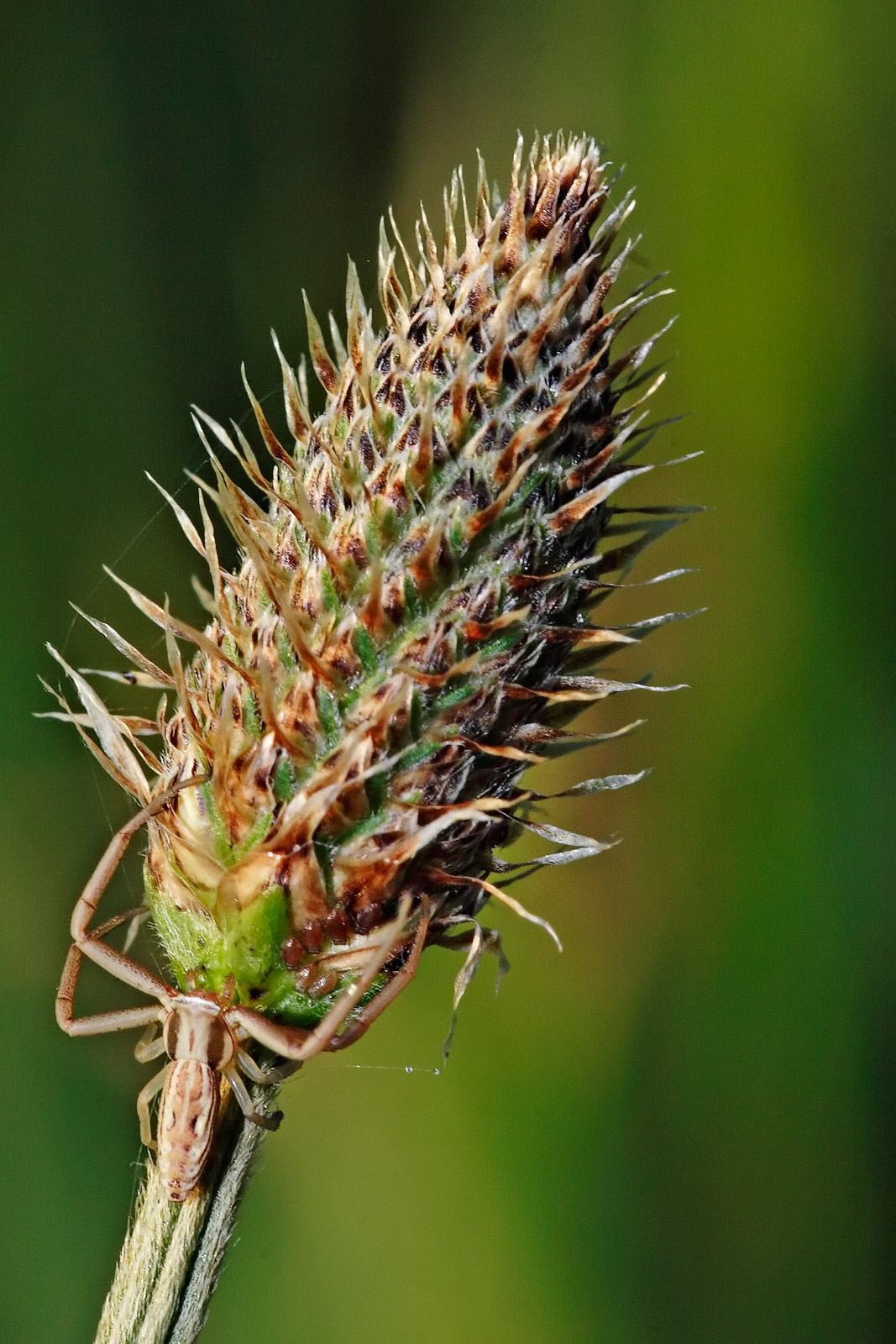
Runcinia acuminata

Runcinia is a genus of crab spiders that was first described by Eugène Simon in 1875.

== Distribution ==
Spiders in this genus are found mostly in Africa and Asia, with few species reaching into Europe.

== Description ==
Spiders of the genus Runcinia are recognized by their fawn, slightly flattened bodies with eyes positioned on distinct carinae (tubercles).

Females measure 4–8 mm in total length, while males are 3–6 mm.The carapace varies from as wide as long to slightly longer than wide and is flattened above. The anterior margin is straight medially with two low carinae on each side, while the posterior margin is concave. The integument is clothed with numerous short irregularly spaced setae.

The abdomen is variable in shape, being triangular, oval, or long and narrow. It is anteriorly truncated and posteriorly either truncated, rounded, or extending caudally past the spinnerets. The abdomen is decorated with longitudinal striae that follow the contour of the abdomen, with rows of setae differing in shape between species.

Legs are fawn in color with legs I and II much stronger than the hind legs. The tibia bears strong paired setae. Males resemble females but are more slender and have longer legs. Front legs have brown bands and setae replaced with a brush of hair.

== Life style ==
Runcinia species are free-living on plants and are very common grass dwellers.

== Species ==
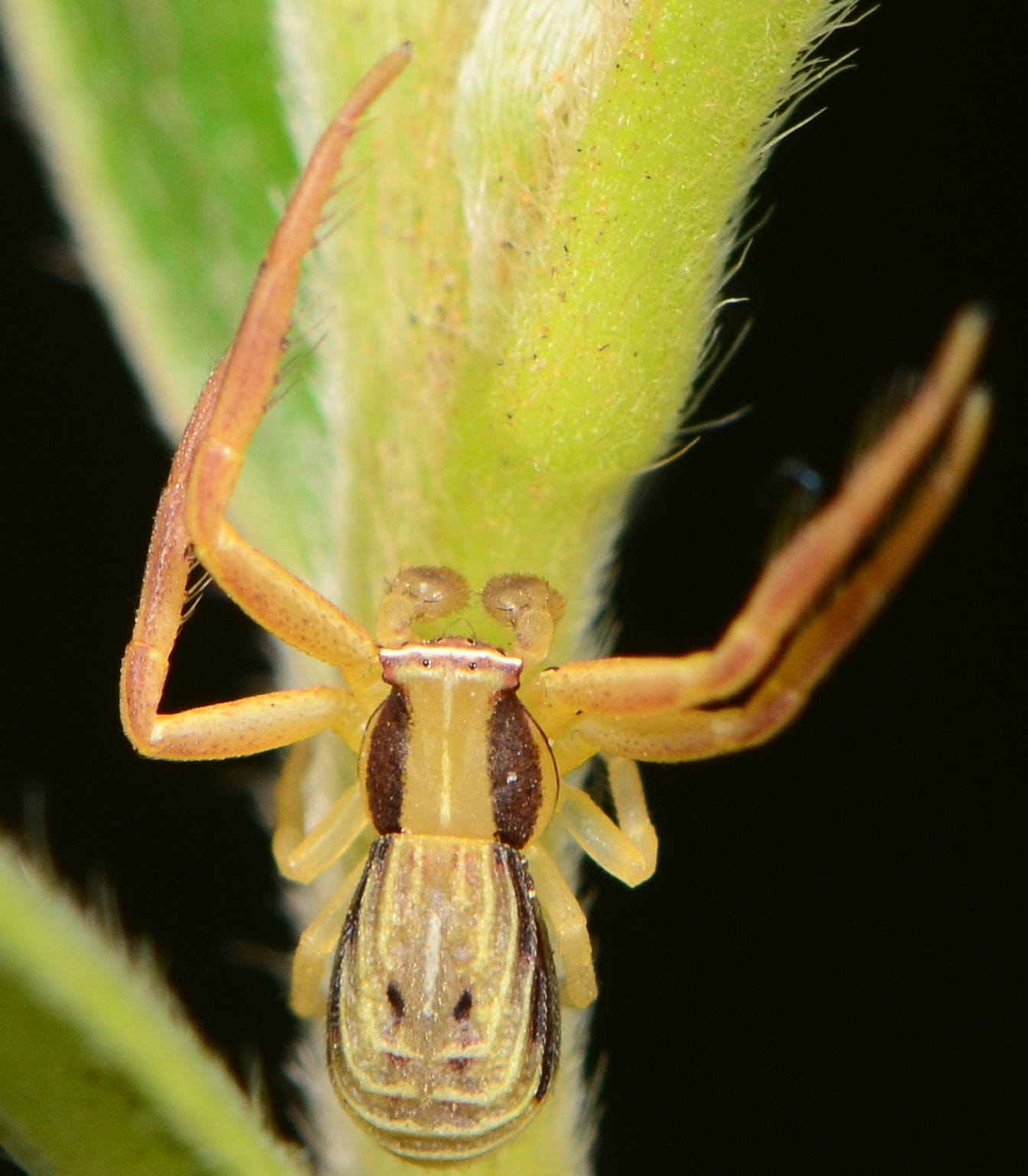
juvenile male R. aethiops

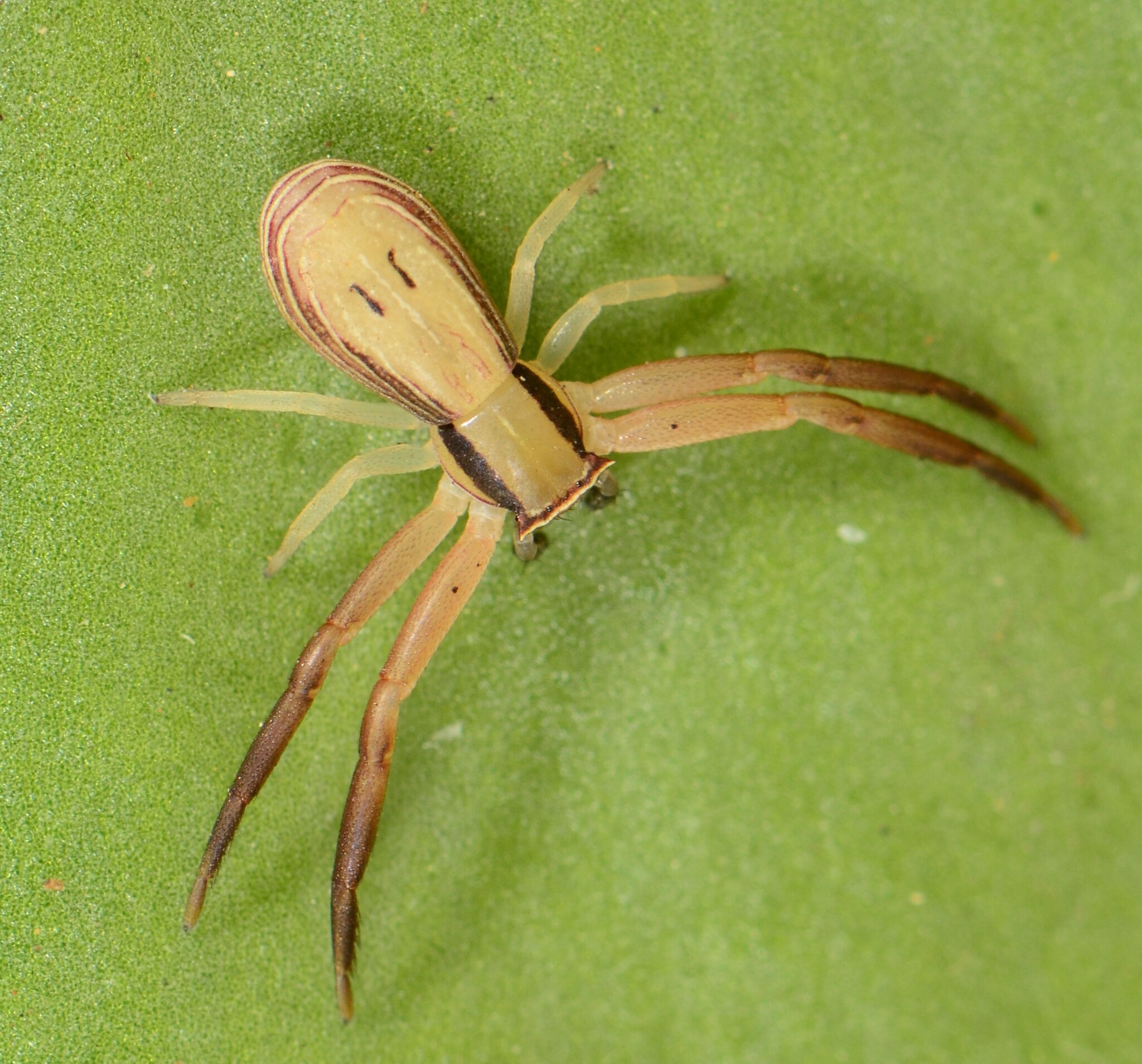
R. depressa

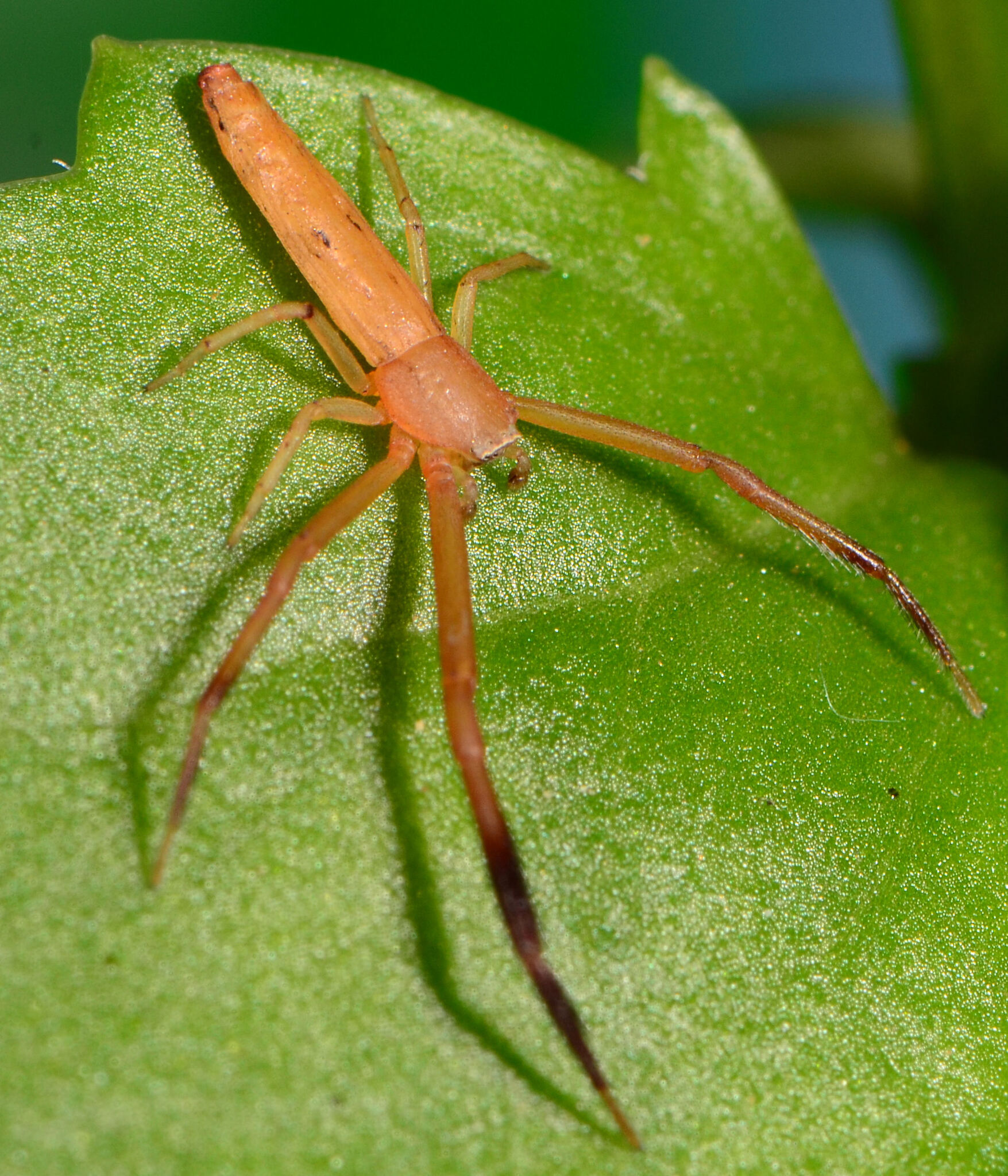
male R. flavida

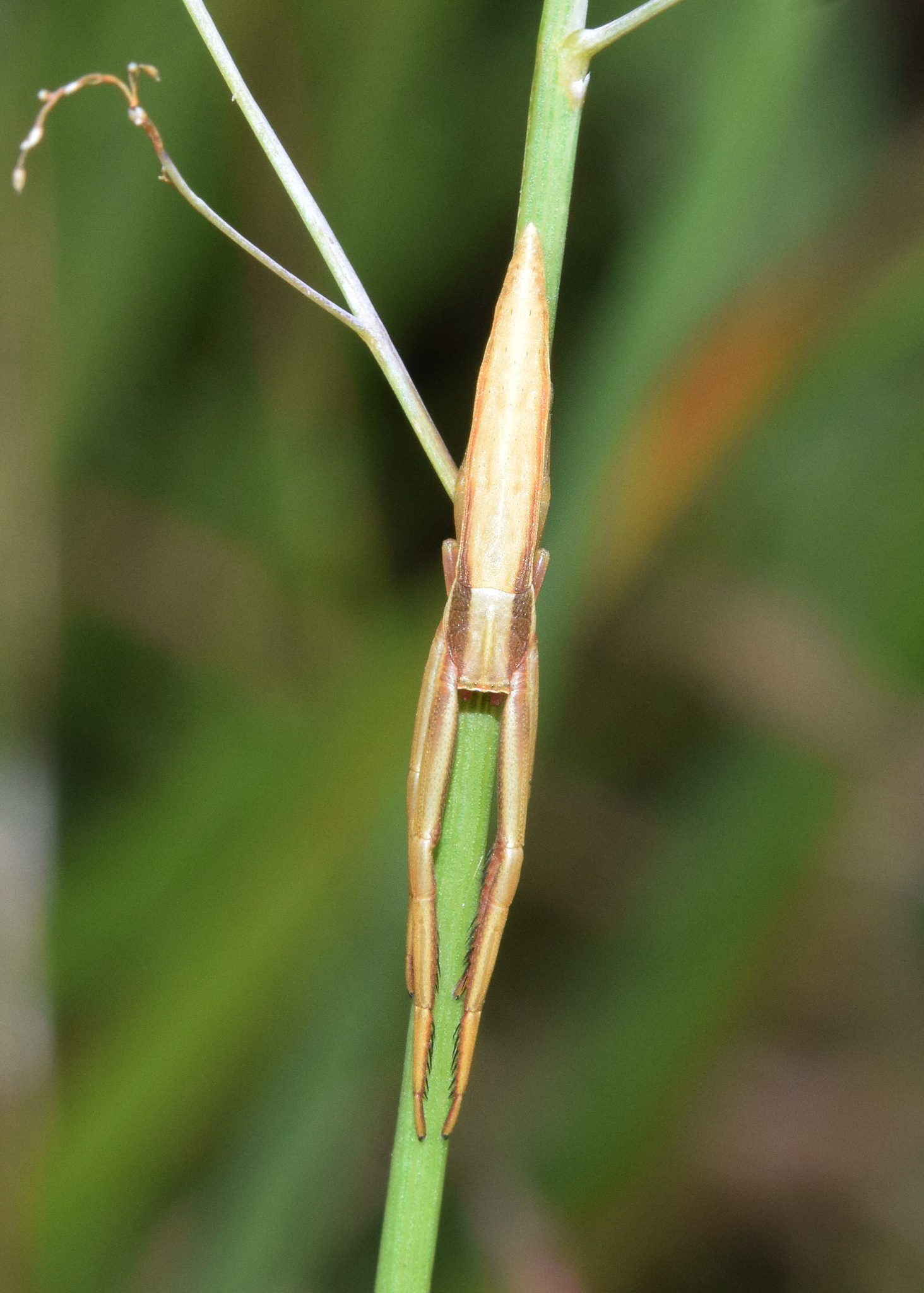
R. johnstoni

As of October 2025, this genus includes 27 species:

- Runcinia acuminata (Thorell, 1881) – Bangladesh to Japan, New Guinea, Australia
- Runcinia aethiops (Simon, 1901) – Africa
- Runcinia albida (Marx, 1893) – DR Congo
- Runcinia bifrons (Simon, 1895) – India, Sri Lanka, Vietnam
- Runcinia carae Dippenaar-Schoeman, 1983 – Botswana, Kenya
- Runcinia caudata Schenkel, 1963 – China
- Runcinia depressa Simon, 1906 – Morocco, Algeria, Egypt, South Sudan, Ivory Coast, Kenya, DR Congo, Zambia, Botswana, South Africa
- Runcinia disticta Thorell, 1891 – Myanmar, Indonesia (Sumatra, Java)
- Runcinia dubia Caporiacco, 1940 – Somalia
- Runcinia erythrina Jézéquel, 1964 – Ivory Coast, Kenya, Botswana, Zimbabwe, South Africa
- Runcinia escheri Reimoser, 1934 – India
- Runcinia flavida (Simon, 1881) – Spain, Africa
- Runcinia ghorpadei Tikader, 1980 – India
- Runcinia grammica (C. L. Koch, 1837) – Europe, Middle East to Iran, Russia (Europe to West Siberia), Kazakhstan, Central Asia, China, Japan. Introduced to St. Helena, South Africa, Lesotho (type species)
- Runcinia insecta (L. Koch, 1875) – Africa, Asia. Introduced to Australia
- Runcinia johnstoni Lessert, 1919 – Senegal, Ivory Coast, DR Congo, Tanzania, Zimbabwe, South Africa
- Runcinia khandari Gajbe, 2004 – India
- Runcinia kinbergi Thorell, 1891 – Myanmar, India (Nicobar Is.), Indonesia (Java)
- Runcinia manicata Thorell, 1895 – Myanmar
- Runcinia multilineata Roewer, 1961 – Senegal
- Runcinia roonwali Tikader, 1965 – India, Nepal
- Runcinia sitadongri Gajbe, 2004 – India
- Runcinia soeensis Schenkel, 1944 – Indonesia (West Timor)
- Runcinia spinulosa (O. Pickard-Cambridge, 1885) – Pakistan
- Runcinia tarabayevi Marusik & Logunov, 1990 – Russia (Europe, Urals), Azerbaijan, Iran, Kazakhstan, Kyrgyzstan, Tajikistan, Mongolia
- Runcinia tropica Simon, 1907 – Africa
- Runcinia yogeshi Gajbe & Gajbe, 2001 – India

In synonymy:

- R. advecticia (Simon, 1909, T from Plancinus) = Runcinia insecta (L. Koch, 1875)
- R. affinis Simon, 1897 = Runcinia insecta (L. Koch, 1875)
- R. albostriata Bösenberg & Strand, 1906 = Runcinia insecta (L. Koch, 1875)
- R. annamita Simon, 1903 = Runcinia insecta (L. Koch, 1875)
- R. cataracta Lawrence, 1927 = Runcinia insecta (L. Koch, 1875)
- R. cerina (C. L. Koch, 1845) = Runcinia grammica (C. L. Koch, 1837)
- R. chauhani Sen & Basu, 1972 = Runcinia insecta (L. Koch, 1875)
- R. cherapunjea (Tikader, 1966, T from Thomisus) = Runcinia insecta (L. Koch, 1875)
- R. littorina Lawrence, 1942 = Runcinia flavida (Simon, 1881)
- R. proxima Lessert, 1919 = Runcinia flavida (Simon, 1881)
- R. proxima Millot, 1941 = Runcinia flavida (Simon, 1881)
- R. sangasanga Barrion & Litsinger, 1995 = Runcinia insecta (L. Koch, 1875)
- R. sjostedti Lessert, 1919 = Runcinia johnstoni Lessert, 1919

The former R. elongata is a synonym of Thomisus elongatus.

== See also ==
- List of Thomisidae species
