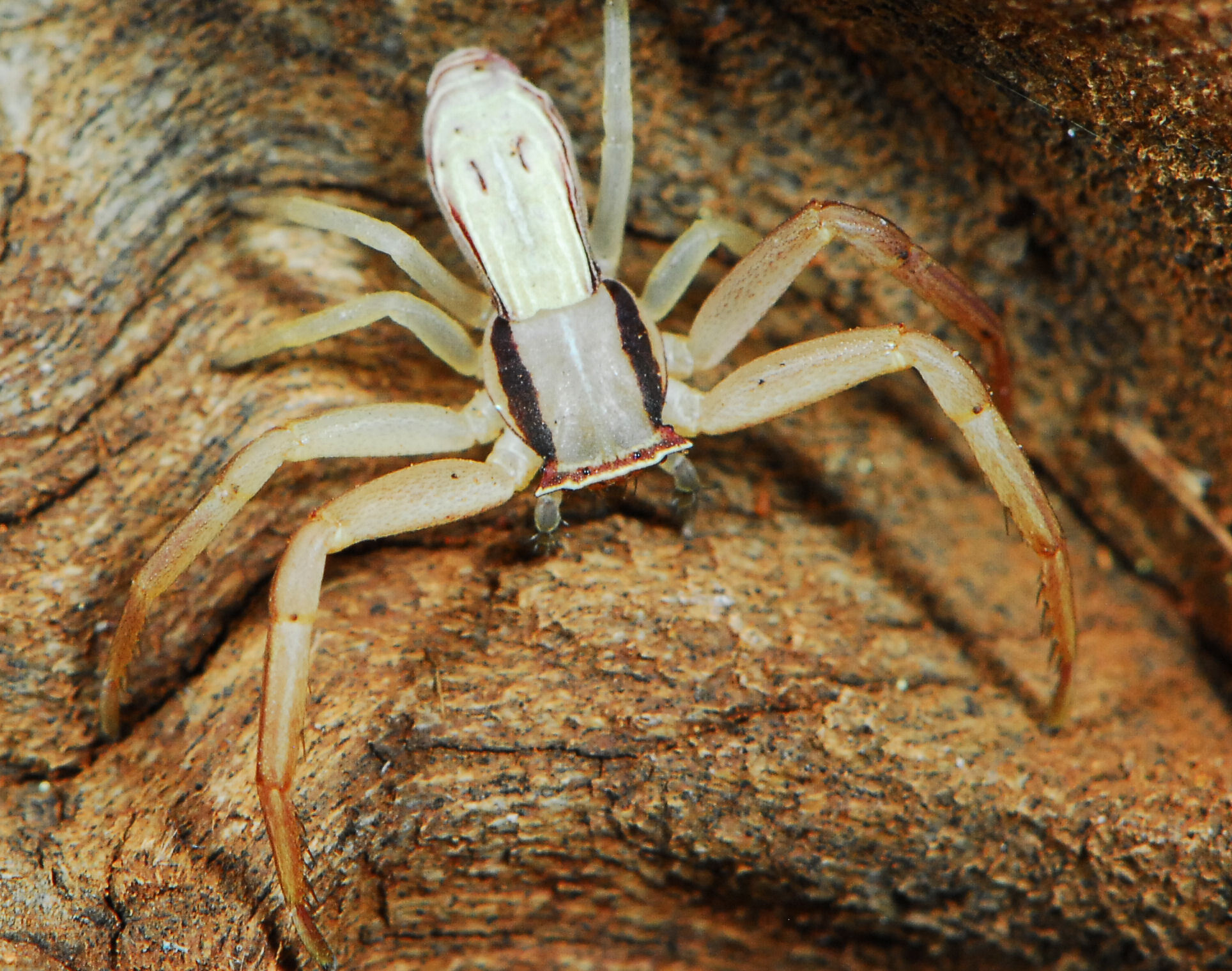
- juvenile female
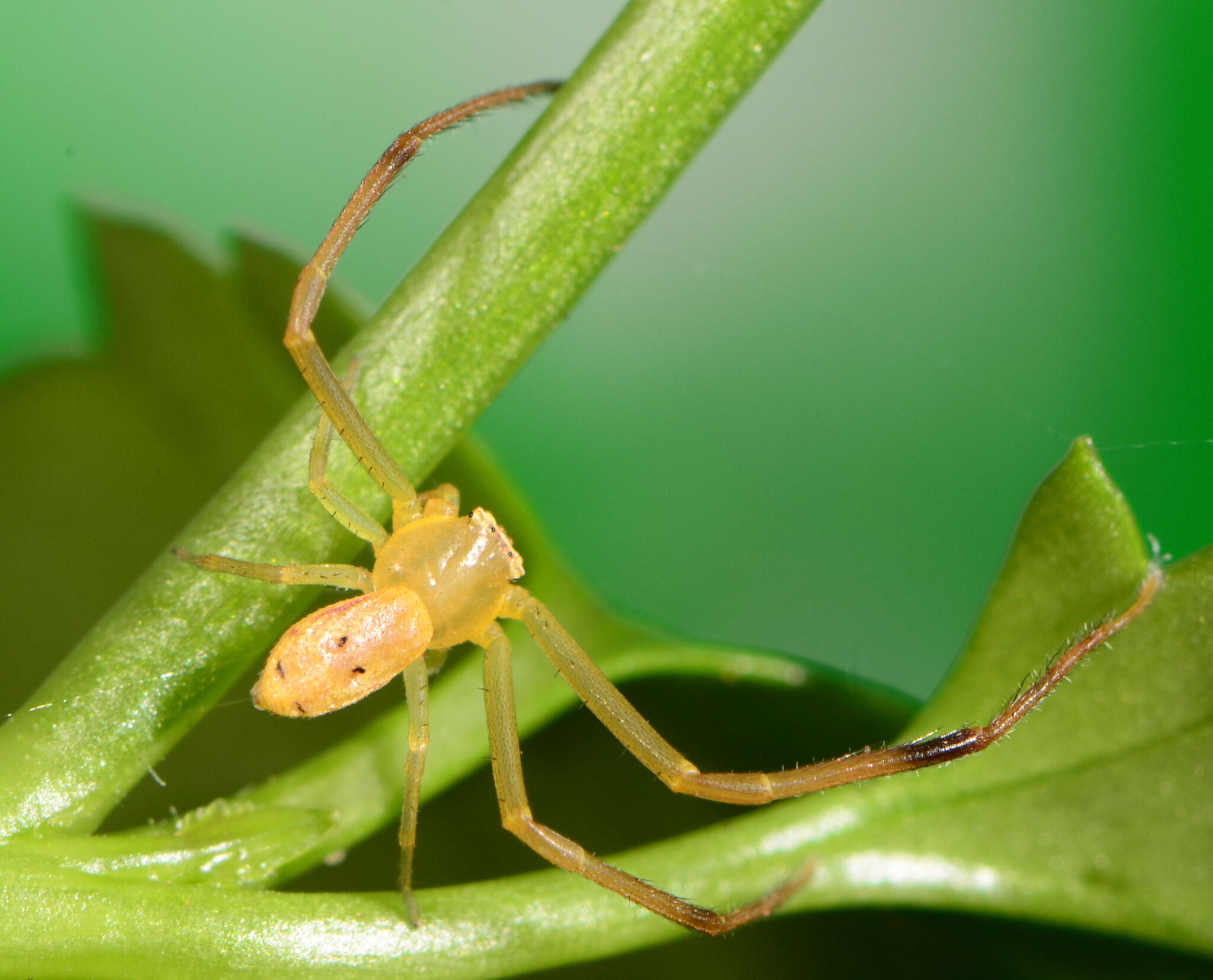
- male

Scientific classification
- Kingdom: Animalia
- Phylum: Arthropoda
- Subphylum: Chelicerata
- Class: Arachnida
- Order: Araneae
- Infraorder: Araneomorphae
- Family: Thomisidae
- Genus: Runcinia
- Species: R. insecta

Binomial name
- Runcinia insecta (L. Koch, 1875)

Synonyms
- Diaea insecta L. Koch, 1875; Runcinia affinis Simon, 1897; Runcinia annamita Simon, 1903; Runcinia albostriata Bösenberg & Strand, 1906; Plancinus advecticius Simon, 1909; Runcinia cataracta Lawrence, 1927; Thomisus cherapunjeus Tikader, 1966; Runcinia chauhani Sen & Basu, 1973; Runcinia sangasanga Barrion & Litsinger, 1995; Thomisus cherapunjius Biswas & Raychaudhuri, 2024

= Runcinia insecta =

Species of spider

Runcinia insecta is a species of spider in the family Thomisidae. It is a common species with a very wide global distribution in the Afrotropical, Oriental, and Palaearctic regions. It has been introduced to Australia.

== Distribution ==
Runcinia insecta occurs throughout Africa and Asia and has been introduced to Australia.

In South Africa, the species is known from all provinces except Northern Cape.

== Habitat and ecology ==
Runcinia insecta are free-living on plants.

In South Africa, they are commonly found on grass in Forest, Fynbos, Grassland, Indian Ocean Coastal Belt, and Savanna biomes at altitudes ranging from 7 to 1,842 m. The species has also been sampled in cotton, lucerne, and strawberry fields.

== Description ==
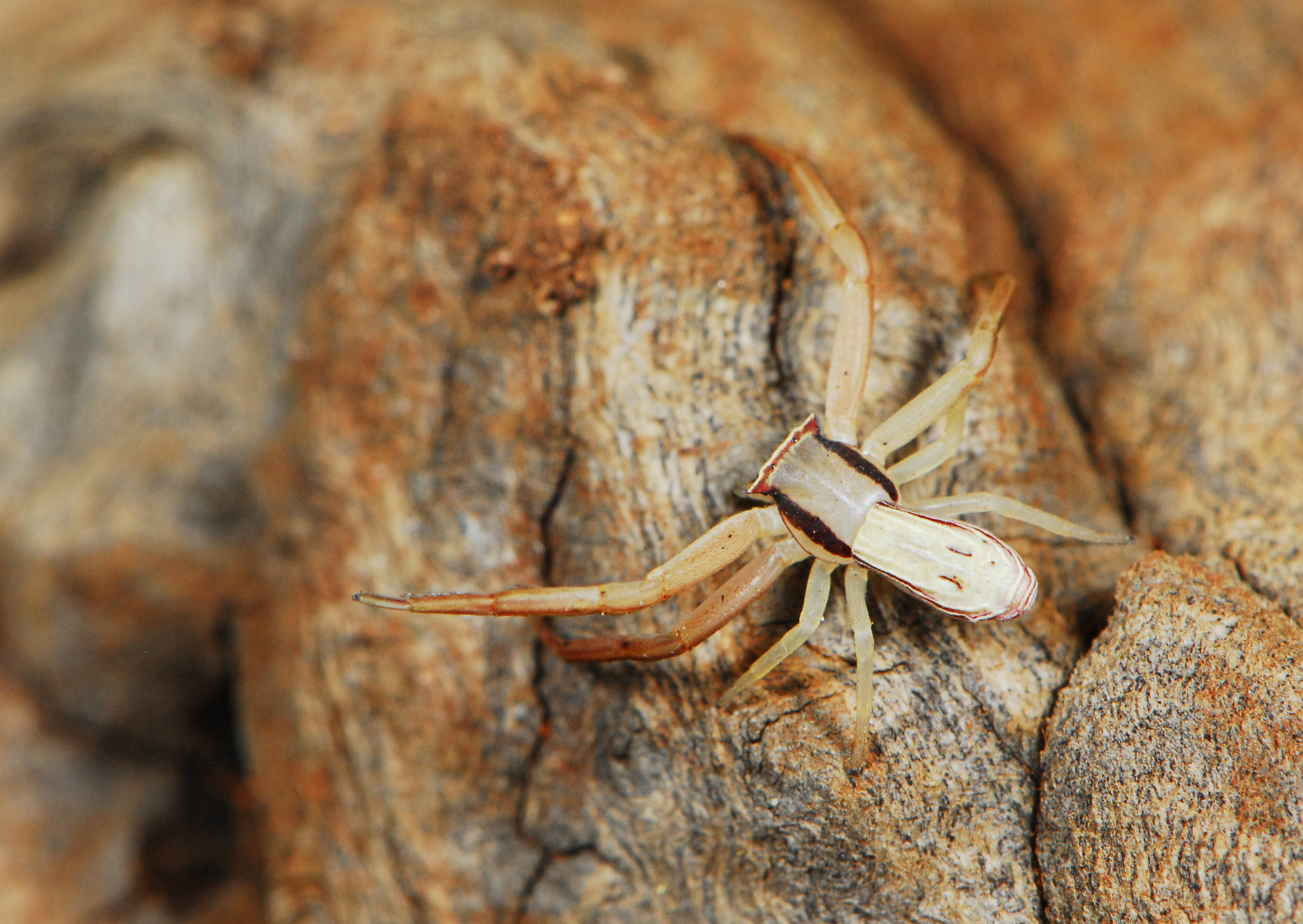
juvenile female

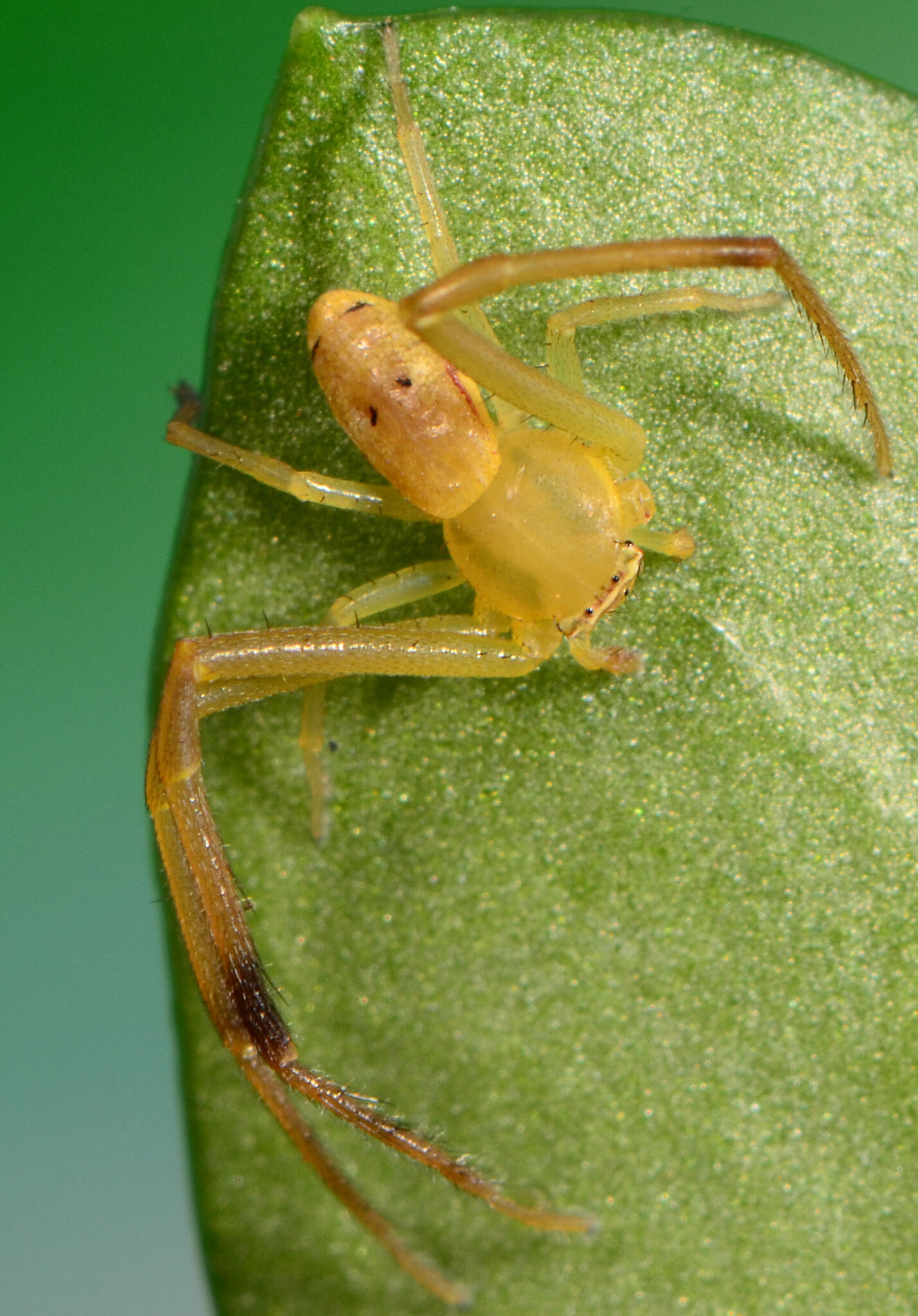
male

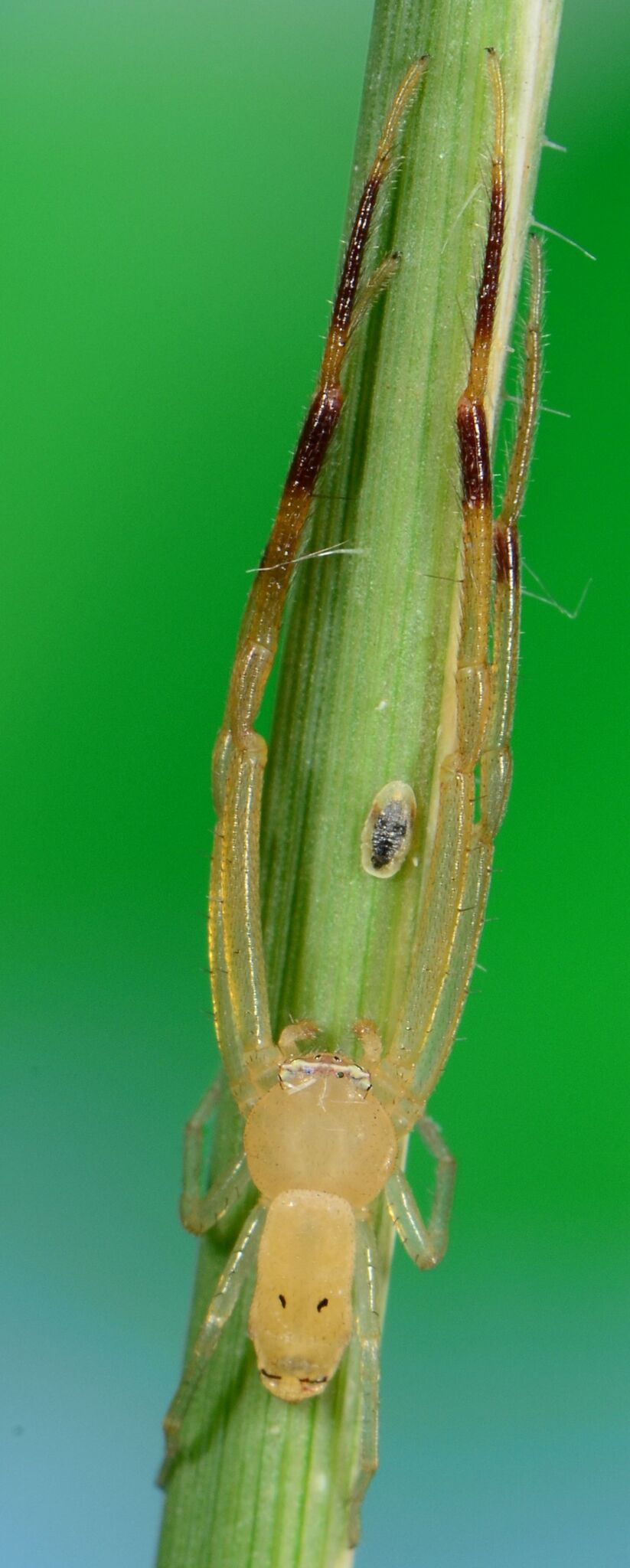
male

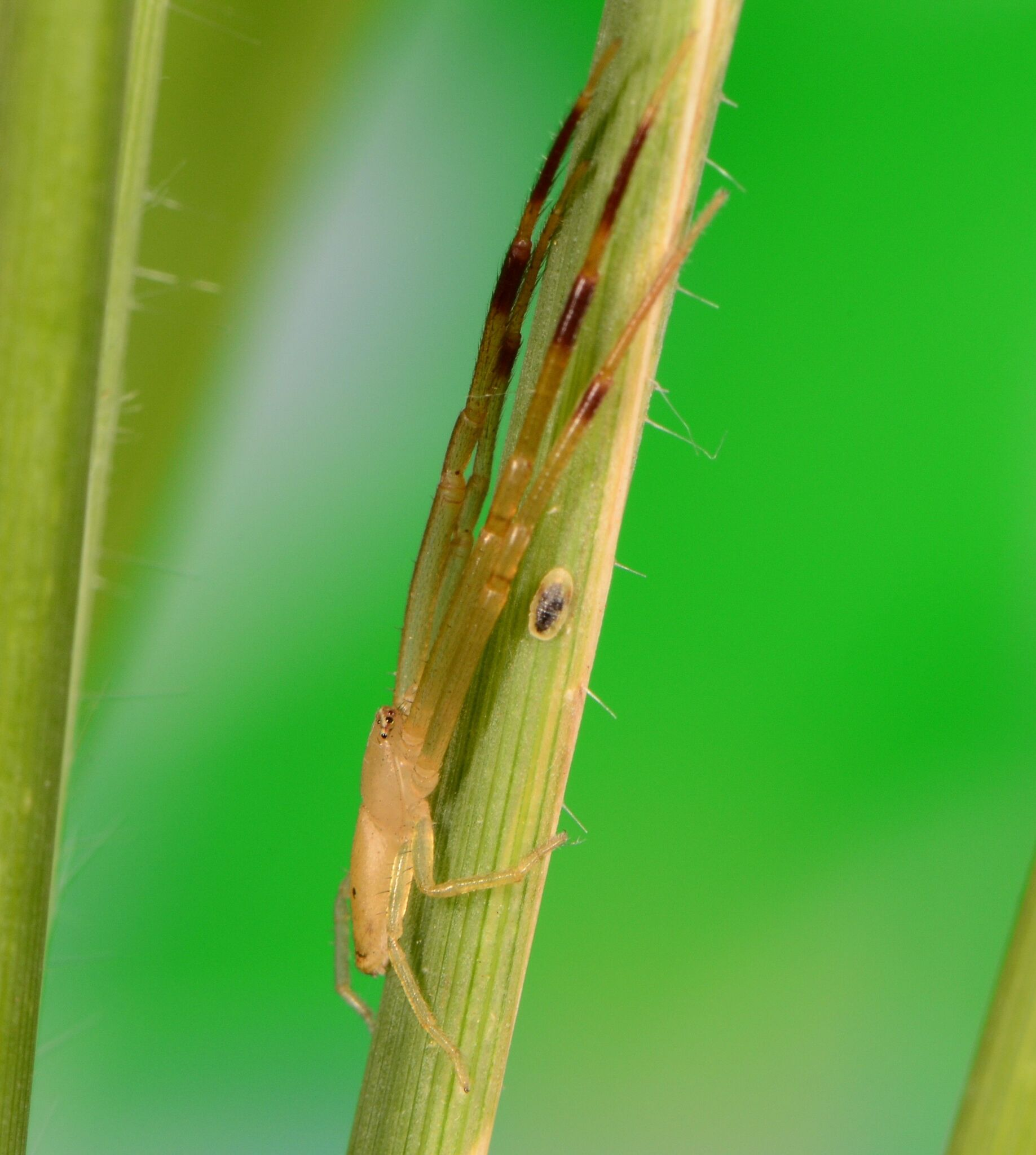
male

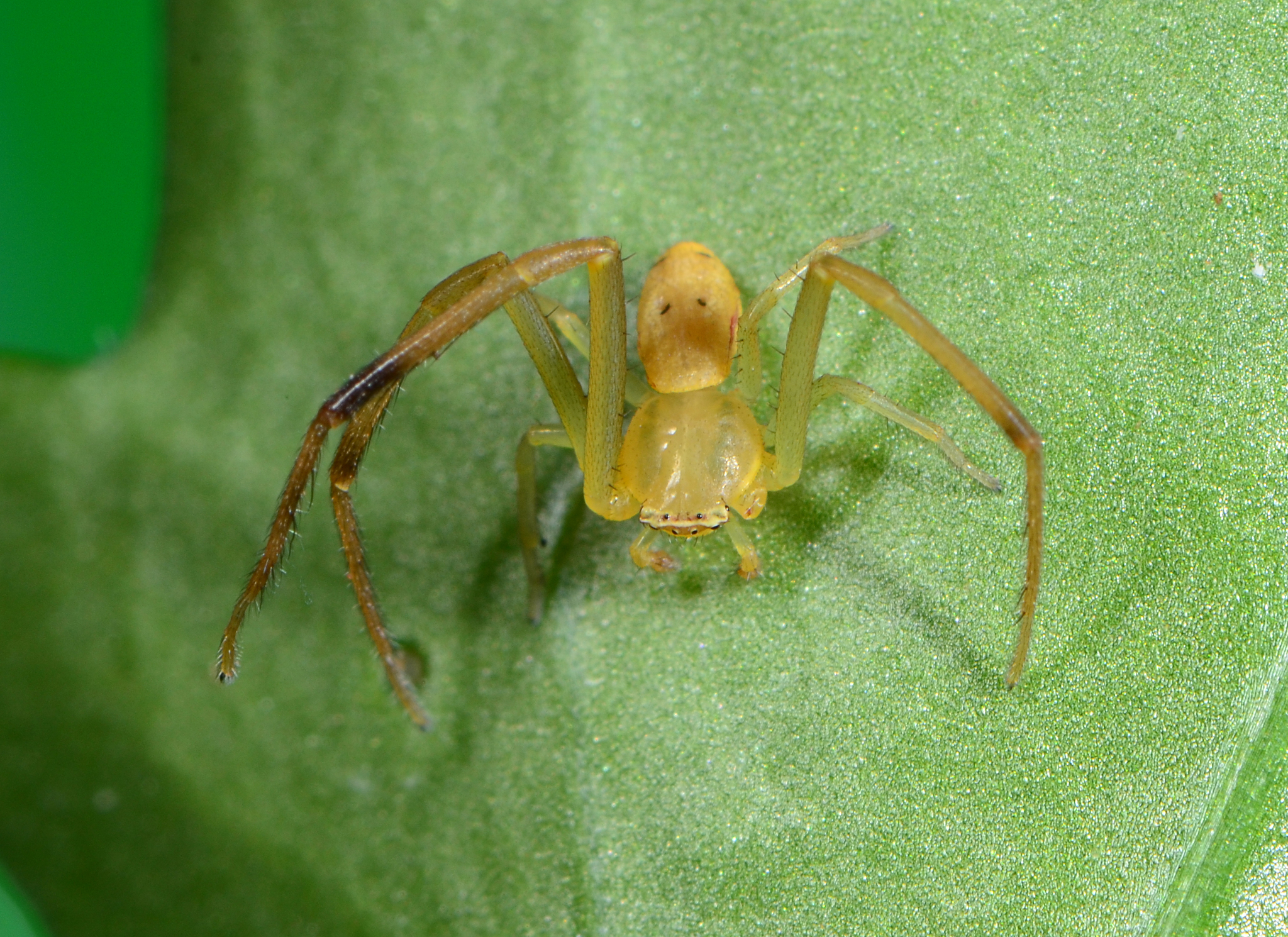
male
