= Runcinia bifrons =

Scientific classification
- Kingdom: Animalia
- Phylum: Arthropoda
- Subphylum: Chelicerata
- Class: Arachnida
- Order: Araneae
- Infraorder: Araneomorphae
- Family: Thomisidae
- Genus: Runcinia
- Species: R. bifrons

Binomial name
- Runcinia bifrons (Simon, 1895)

Species of spider

Runcinia bifrons is a species of spiders of the genus Runcinia. It is native to India, Sri Lanka and Vietnam.
