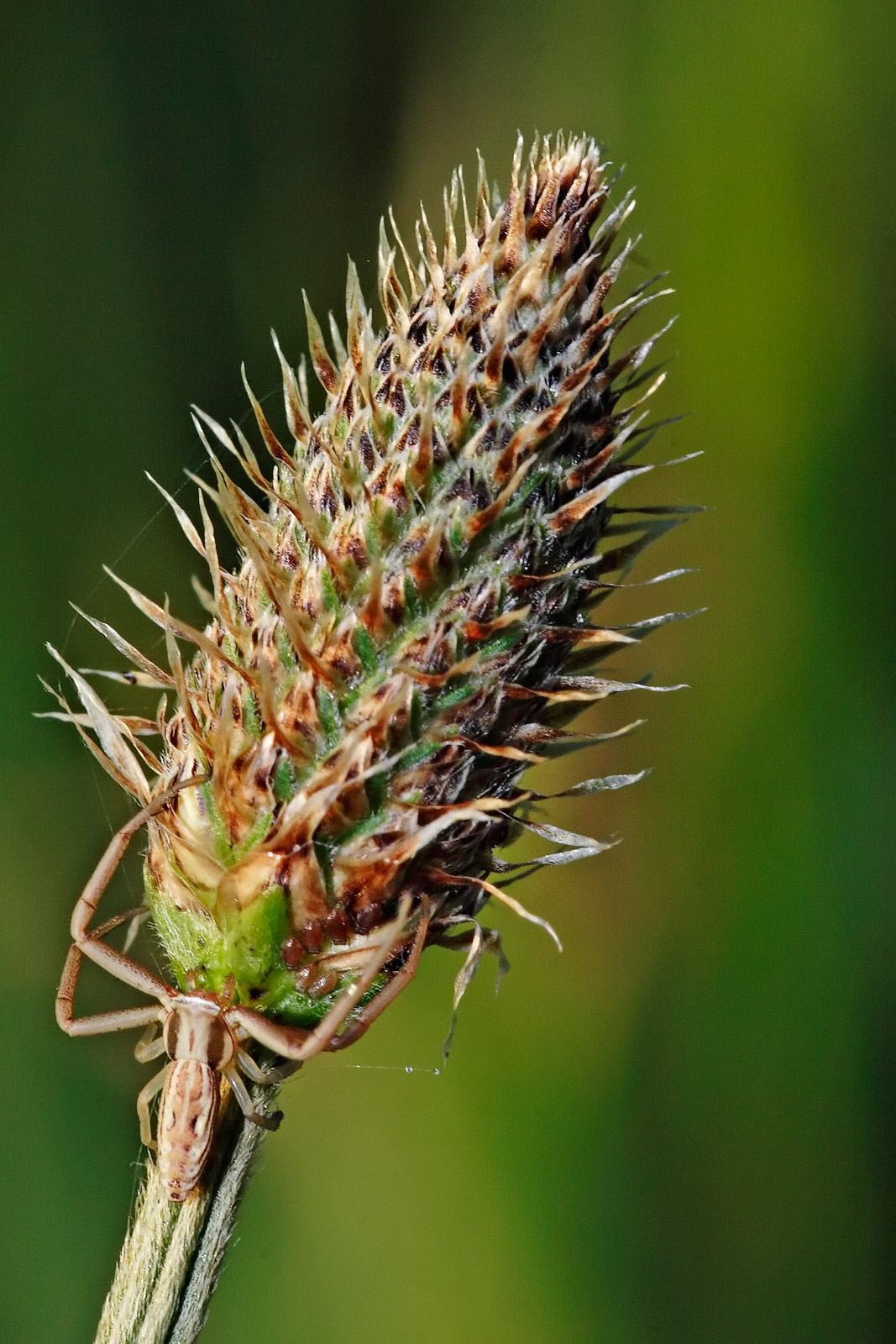
- Runcinia acuminata on Plantago plant

Scientific classification
- Kingdom: Animalia
- Phylum: Arthropoda
- Subphylum: Chelicerata
- Class: Arachnida
- Order: Araneae
- Infraorder: Araneomorphae
- Family: Thomisidae
- Genus: Runcinia
- Species: R. acuminata

Binomial name
- Runcinia acuminata (Thorell, 1881)

Synonyms
- Misumena elongata Pistius acuminatus Runcinia elongata Runcinia albostriata

= Runcinia acuminata =

Species of spider

Runcinia acuminata is a species of crab spiders.

Females reach a body length of about 10 mm, males less than 6 mm. They are often found in seeding heads of grasses, where the females build and camouflage their egg sacs. They mainly feed on moths that visit these grasses.

== Distribution ==
This species is known from Bangladesh to Japan, Borneo, New Guinea and Australia (New South Wales and Queensland).

== Name ==
The species name is derived from Latin acuminatus "pointed".
