= Runcinia tropica =

Tropical Runcinia Grass Crab Spider

Scientific classification
- Kingdom: Animalia
- Phylum: Arthropoda
- Subphylum: Chelicerata
- Class: Arachnida
- Order: Araneae
- Infraorder: Araneomorphae
- Family: Thomisidae
- Genus: Runcinia
- Species: R. tropica

Binomial name
- Runcinia tropica Simon, 1907

Synonyms
- Runcinia affinis tropica Simon, 1907

Species of spider

Runcinia tropica is a species of spider in the family Thomisidae. It is commonly known as the tropical Runcinia grass crab spider and is widespread throughout Africa.

== Distribution ==
Runcinia tropica has a wide distribution throughout Africa.

In South Africa, it has been recorded from Gauteng (Roodeplaatdam Nature Reserve), KwaZulu-Natal (Empangeni), and Mpumalanga (Belfast).

== Habitat and ecology ==
Runcinia tropica are free-living on plants.

In South Africa, they have been sampled in Grassland, Indian Ocean Coastal Belt, and Savanna biomes, at altitudes ranging from 78 to 1,871 m.

== Taxonomy ==
Runcinia tropica was described by Eugène Simon in 1907 from Annobón as a subspecies Runcinia affinis tropica. Dippenaar-Schoeman elevated it to species status in 1980. The species was revised by Dippenaar-Schoeman in 1980 and 1983 and is known from both sexes.
