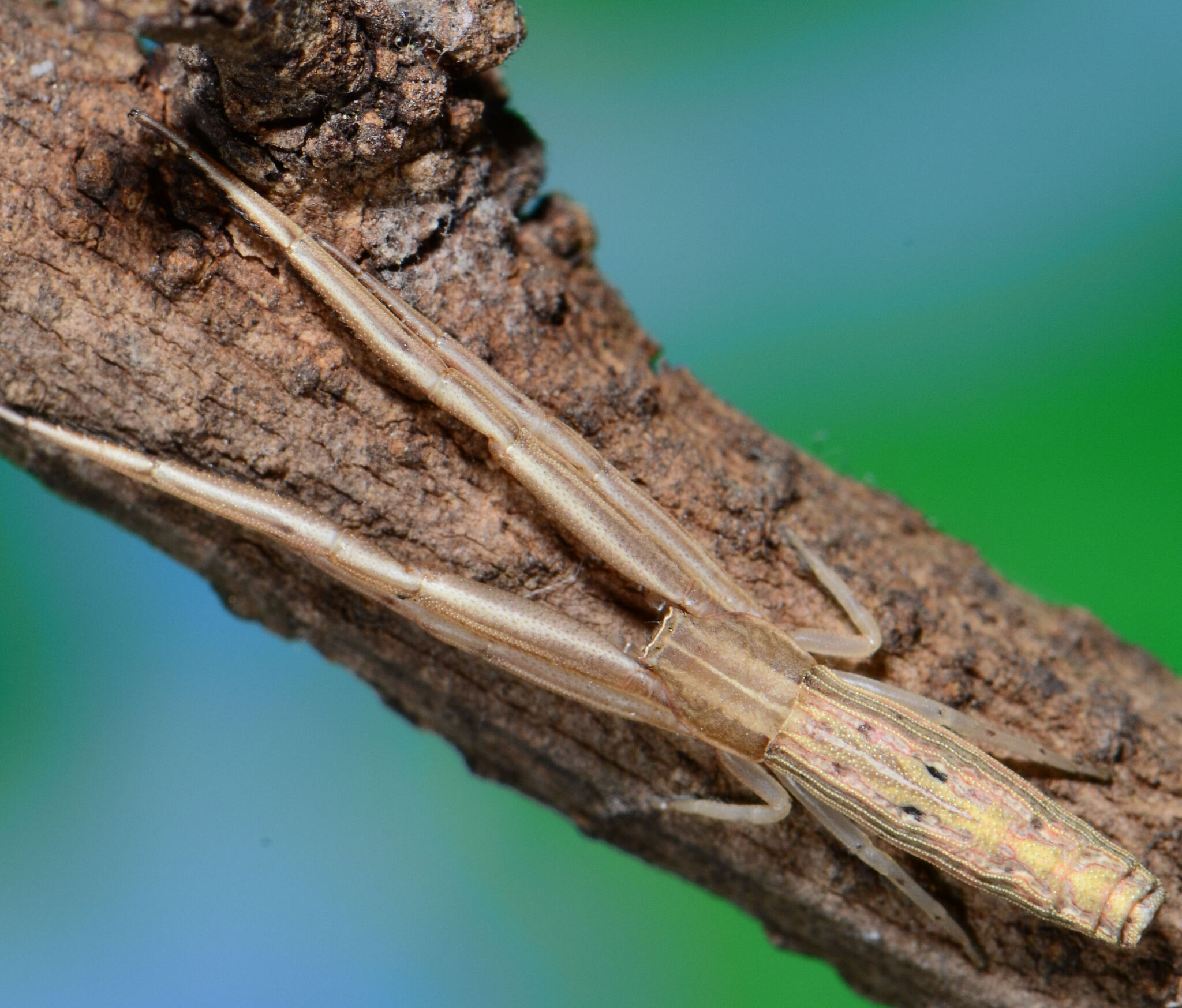
- female
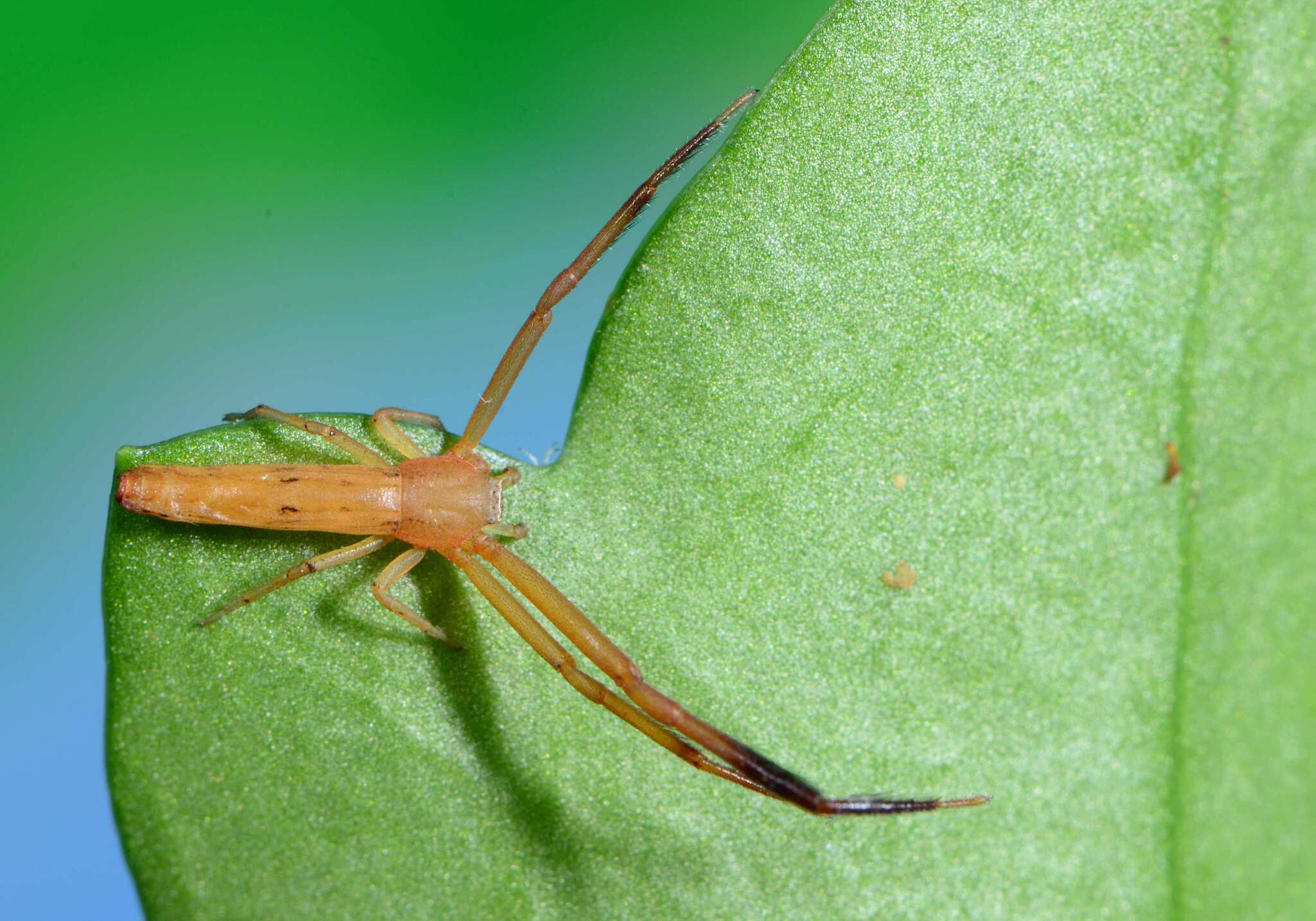
- male

Scientific classification
- Kingdom: Animalia
- Phylum: Arthropoda
- Subphylum: Chelicerata
- Class: Arachnida
- Order: Araneae
- Infraorder: Araneomorphae
- Family: Thomisidae
- Genus: Runcinia
- Species: R. flavida

Binomial name
- Runcinia flavida (Simon, 1881)

Synonyms
- Runciniopsis flavida Simon, 1881; Runcinia proxima Lessert, 1919; Runcinia littorina Lawrence, 1942

= Runcinia flavida =

Long Runcinia Grass Crab Spider

Species of spider

Runcinia flavida is a species of spider in the family Thomisidae. It is commonly known as the long Runcinia grass crab spider and has a wide distribution across Africa and Spain.

== Distribution ==
Runcinia flavida has been recorded from throughout Africa, and has been introduced to Spain.

In South Africa, the species is known from all nine provinces.

== Habitat and ecology ==
Runcinia flavida are free-living on plants and mostly sampled from grass. The species has been found in all floral biomes except the Desert and Succulent Karoo biomes, at altitudes ranging from 4 to 1,842 m. The species has also been sampled in pine plantations and strawberry fields.

Adults are found throughout the year and it takes one year to reach maturity.

== Description ==
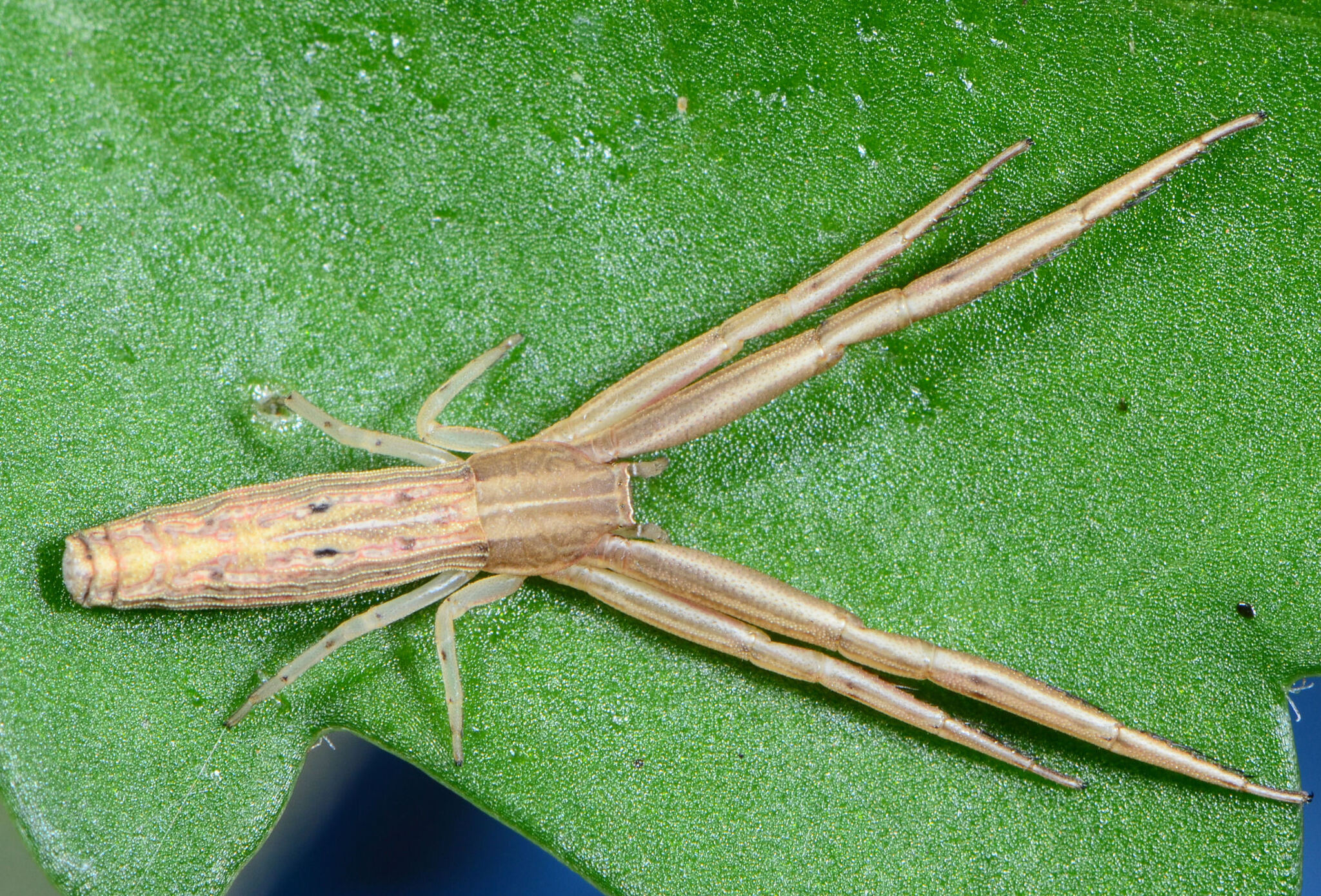
female

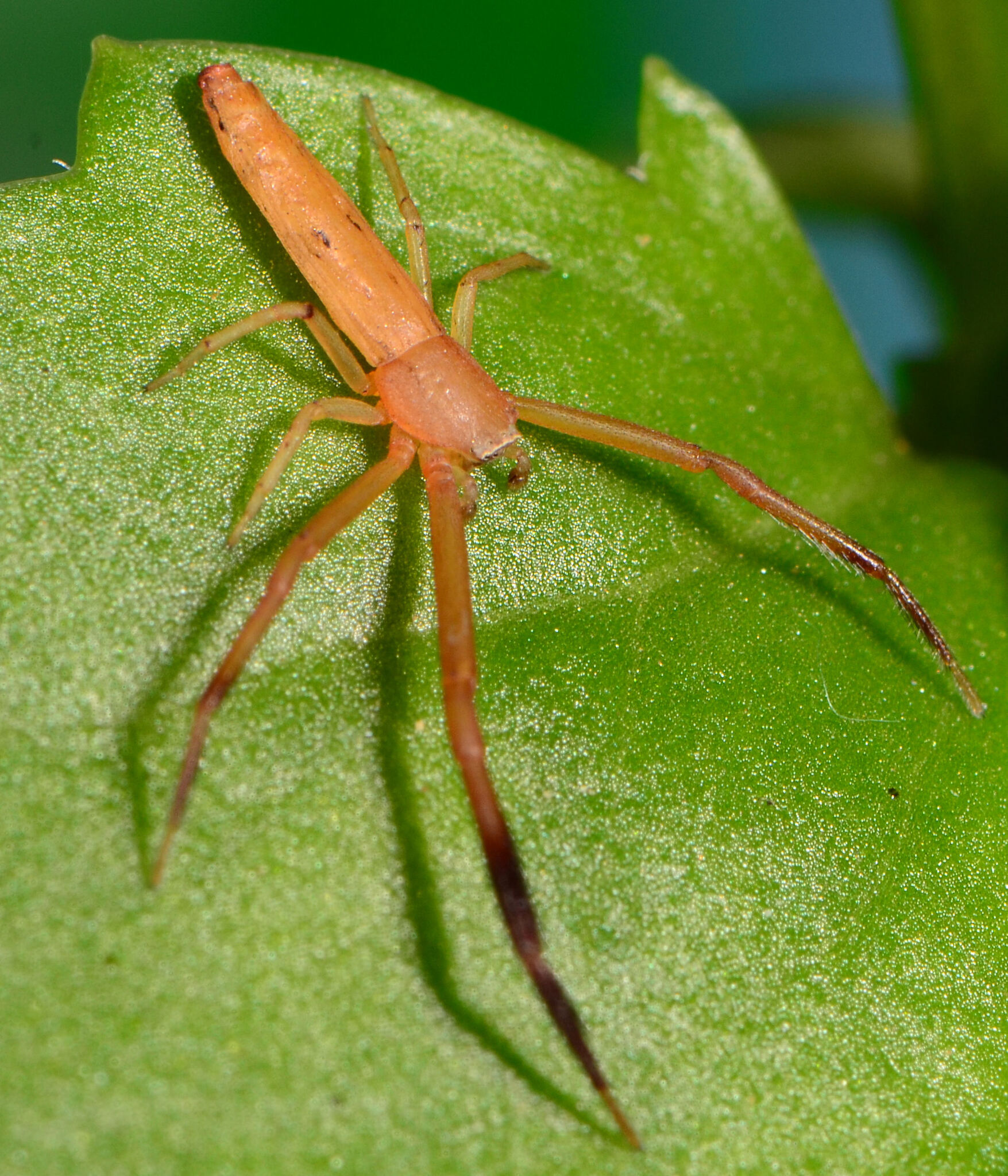
male

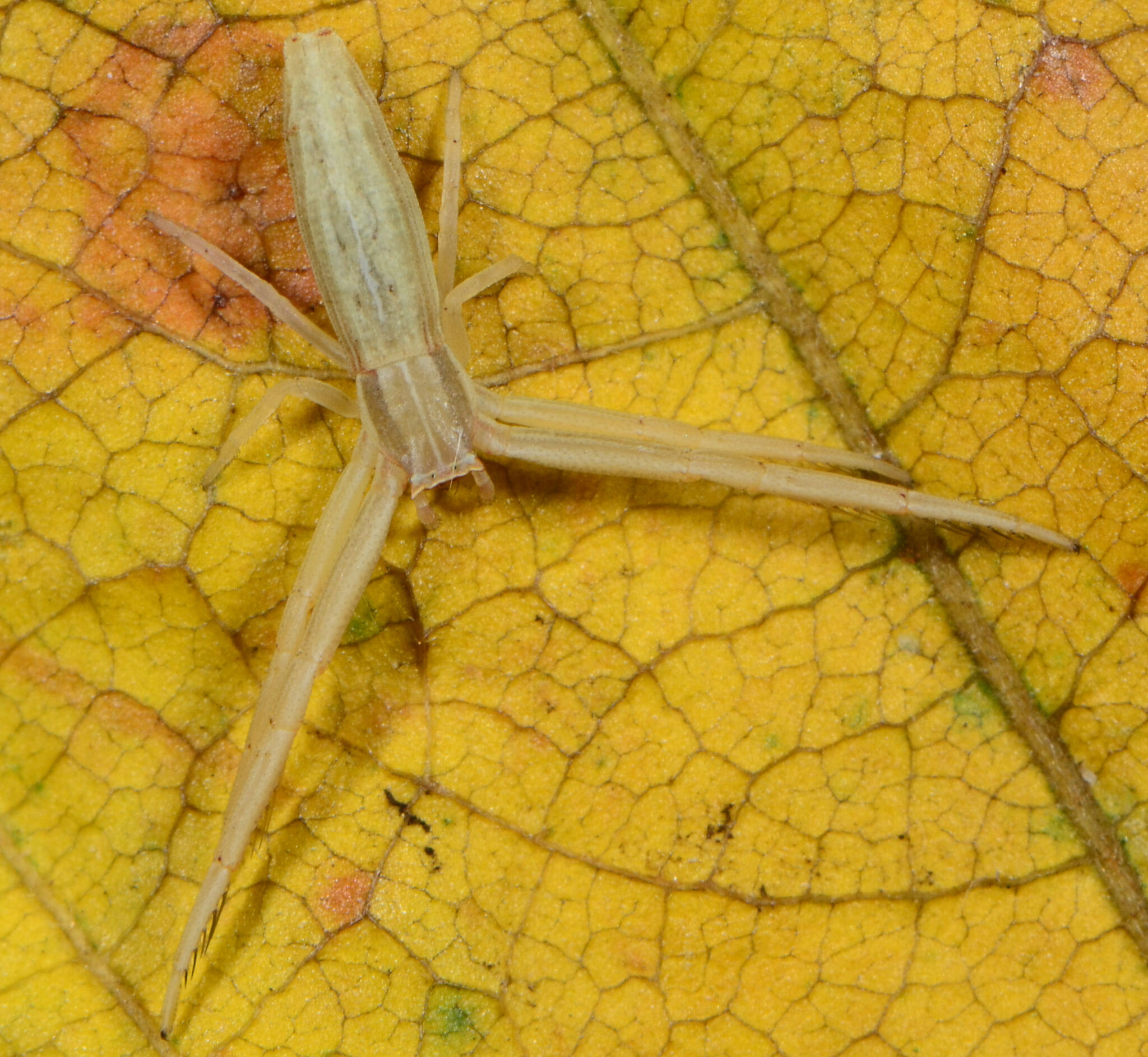
juvenile female

The species is characterized by its elongated body form, from which the common name derives. Like other Runcinia species, it possesses eyes on distinct carinae and longitudinal striae on the abdomen.

== Conservation ==
Runcinia flavida is listed as Least Concern due to its wide geographical range. The species is recorded in more than thirty protected areas throughout South Africa.
