= Hamataliwa fronticornis =

Crowned Lynx Spider

Conservation status
- Least Concern (SANBI Red List)

Scientific classification
- Kingdom: Animalia
- Phylum: Arthropoda
- Subphylum: Chelicerata
- Class: Arachnida
- Order: Araneae
- Infraorder: Araneomorphae
- Family: Oxyopidae
- Genus: Hamataliwa
- Species: H. fronticornis

Binomial name
- Hamataliwa fronticornis (Lessert, 1927)

Synonyms
- Oxyopeidon fronticornis Lessert, 1927

Species of spider

Hamataliwa fronticornis is a species of spider in the family Oxyopidae. It is commonly known as the crowned lynx spider and is endemic to parts of southern Africa.

== Distribution ==
Hamataliwa fronticornis has been recorded from the Democratic Republic of the Congo and South Africa. In South Africa, it occurs in four provinces: Eastern Cape, KwaZulu-Natal, Limpopo, and Mpumalanga.

The species has a wide geographical range, occurring at altitudes from 54 to 1,451 m above sea level.

== Habitat and ecology ==
Hamataliwa fronticornis is a free-living plant dweller commonly found on grasses. It inhabits the Grassland and Savanna biomes.

== Description ==
The species is currently known only from female specimens. Like other members of the genus Hamataliwa, it resembles Oxyopes species in colour and size but differs in having posterior median eyes wider from each other than from posterior lateral eyes and a face that slopes more gradually towards the clypeus.

== Taxonomy ==
The species was originally described as Oxyopeidon fronticornis by Lessert in 1927 from specimens collected in the Democratic Republic of the Congo.

== Conservation ==
Hamataliwa fronticornis is listed as Least Concern by the South African National Biodiversity Institute due to its wide geographical range. The species is protected in eight protected areas including Baviaanskloof Nature Reserve, Mkuze Game Reserve, Tembe Elephant Park, Phinda Game Reserve, Polokwane Nature Reserve, Lhuvhondo Nature Reserve, and Lapalala Wilderness.
