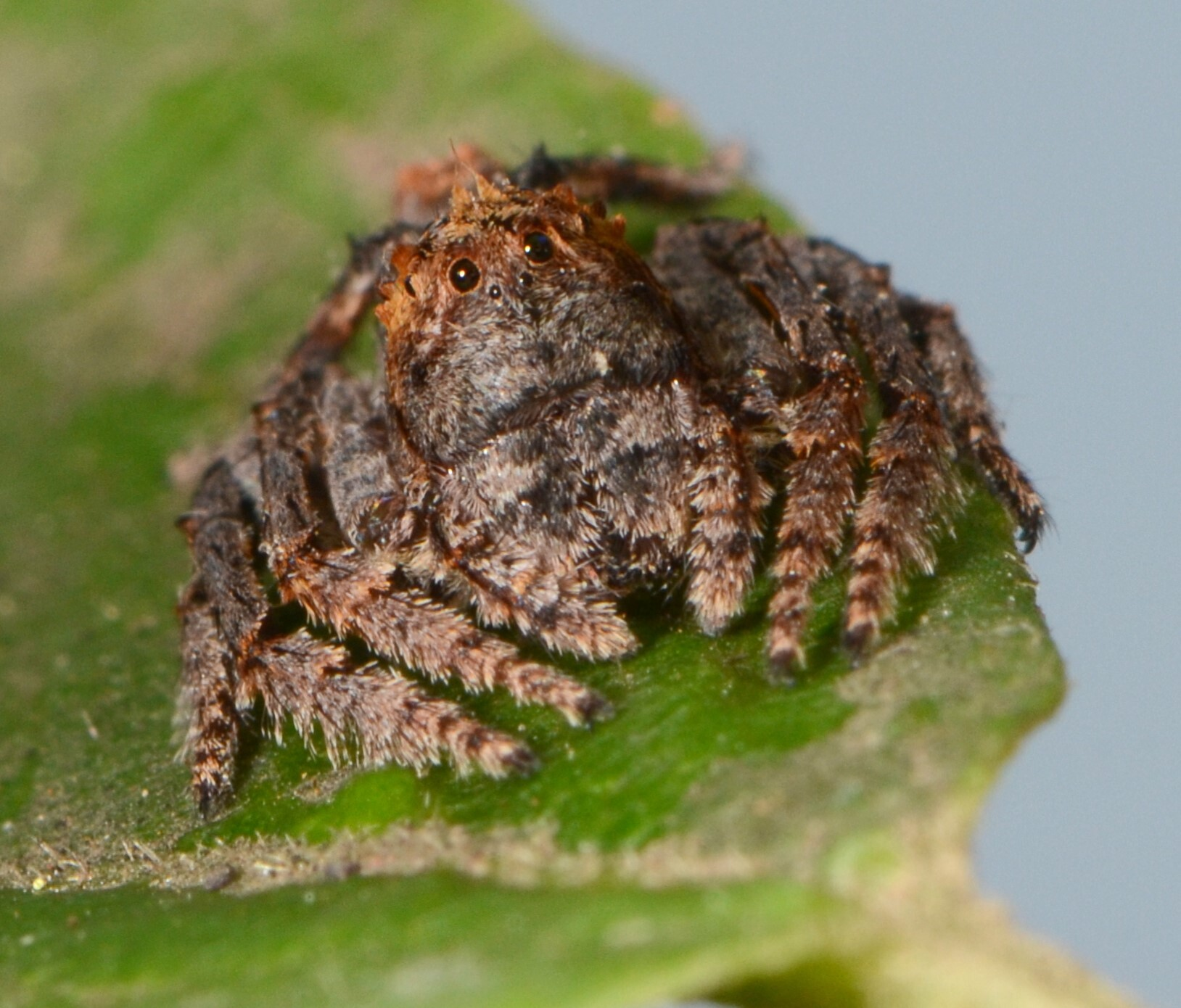
- Female
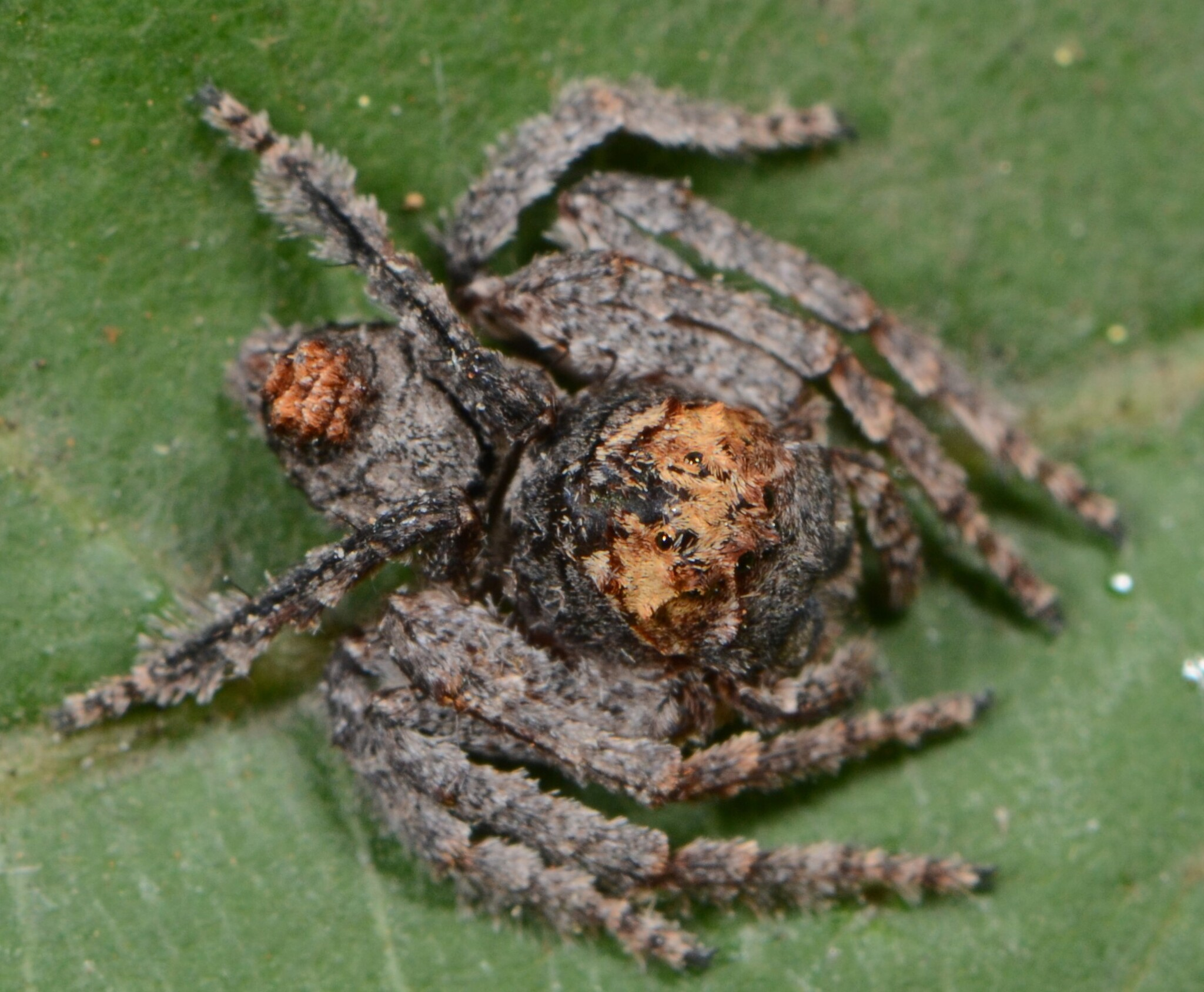
- Female

Conservation status
- Least Concern (SANBI Red List)

Scientific classification
- Kingdom: Animalia
- Phylum: Arthropoda
- Subphylum: Chelicerata
- Class: Arachnida
- Order: Araneae
- Infraorder: Araneomorphae
- Family: Oxyopidae
- Genus: Hamataliwa
- Species: H. rostrifrons

Binomial name
- Hamataliwa rostrifrons (Lawrence, 1928)

Synonyms
- Oxyopeidon rostrifrons Lawrence, 1928

= Hamataliwa rostrifrons =

Tuft Head Lynx Spider

Species of spider

Hamataliwa rostrifrons is a species of spider in the family Oxyopidae. It is commonly known as the tuft head lynx spider and is endemic to southern Africa.

== Distribution ==
Hamataliwa rostrifrons occurs in Namibia and South Africa. In South Africa, it is recorded from four provinces: Eastern Cape, KwaZulu-Natal, Limpopo, and North West.

The species has a wide geographical range, occurring at altitudes from 16 to 1,556 m above sea level.

== Habitat and ecology ==
Hamataliwa rostrifrons is a free-living plant dweller that inhabits the Savanna, Indian Ocean Coastal Belt and Thicket biomes.

== Description ==
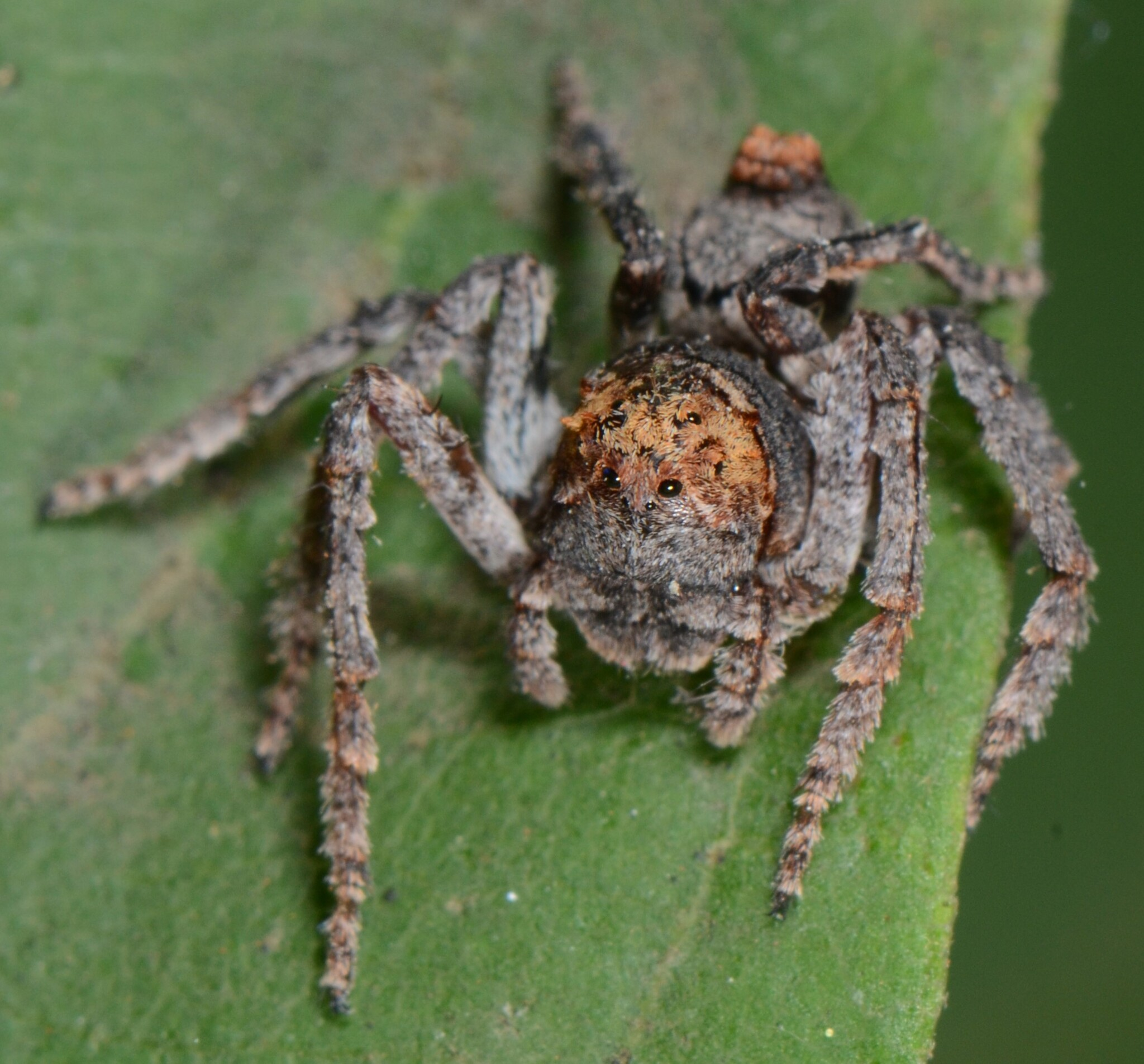
Female

The species is currently known only from females. Like other members of the genus Hamataliwa, it resembles Oxyopes species in color and size but can be distinguished by its eye arrangement and facial structure.

== Taxonomy ==
The species was originally described as Oxyopeidon rostrifrons by Lawrence in 1928 from specimens collected in Namibia.

== Conservation ==
Hamataliwa rostrifrons is listed as Least Concern by the South African National Biodiversity Institute due to its wide geographical range. The species is protected in seven protected areas including iSimangaliso Wetland Park, Mkuze Game Reserve, Ndumo Game Reserve, Phinda Game Reserve, Tembe Elephant Park, Nylsvley Nature Reserve, and Kgaswane Mountain Reserve.
