= Hamataliwa kulczynskii =

Kulczynski's Crowned Lynx Spider

Conservation status
- Least Concern (SANBI Red List)

Scientific classification
- Kingdom: Animalia
- Phylum: Arthropoda
- Subphylum: Chelicerata
- Class: Arachnida
- Order: Araneae
- Infraorder: Araneomorphae
- Family: Oxyopidae
- Genus: Hamataliwa
- Species: H. kulczynskii

Binomial name
- Hamataliwa kulczynskii (Lessert, 1915)

Synonyms
- Oxyopeidon kulczynskii Lessert, 1915

Species of spider

Hamataliwa kulczynskii is a species of spider in the family Oxyopidae. It is commonly known as Kulczynski's crowned lynx spider and is endemic to Africa.

== Etymology ==
The species is named after Polish arachnologist Władysław Kulczyński.

== Distribution ==
Hamataliwa kulczynskii occurs in Ethiopia, Eswatini, Botswana, and South Africa. In South Africa, it is recorded from six provinces: Gauteng, KwaZulu-Natal, Limpopo, Northern Cape, Mpumalanga, and Western Cape.

The species has a wide geographical range, occurring at altitudes from 7 to 1,498 m above sea level.

== Habitat and ecology ==
Hamataliwa kulczynskii is a free-living plant dweller that inhabits the Fynbos, Indian Ocean Coastal Belt, Grassland, and Savanna biomes. The species has also been found in avocado and macadamia orchards.

== Description ==
The species is known from both sexes and has been illustrated in taxonomic literature. Like other Hamataliwa species, it resembles Oxyopes in color and size but differs in having posterior median eyes wider from each other than from posterior lateral eyes.

== Taxonomy ==
The species was originally described as Oxyopeidon kulczynskii by Lessert in 1915 from specimens collected in Ethiopia.

== Conservation ==
Hamataliwa kulczynskii is listed as Least Concern by the South African National Biodiversity Institute due to its wide geographical range. The species is protected in more than ten protected areas including iSimangaliso Wetland Park, Mkuze Game Reserve, Ndumo Game Reserve, Tembe Elephant Park, Blouberg Nature Reserve, and Kruger National Park.
