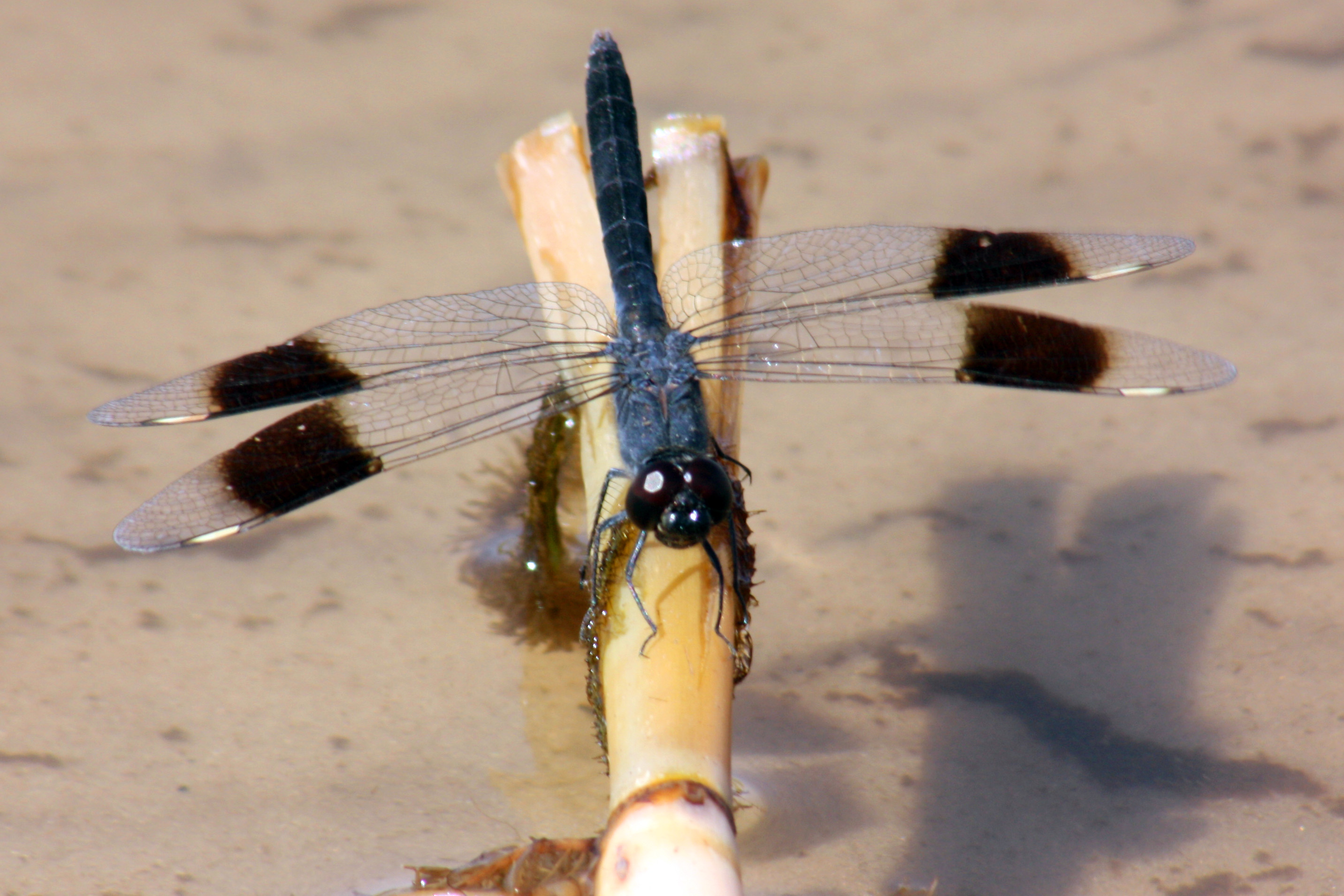
- Male, Okavango Delta, Botswana
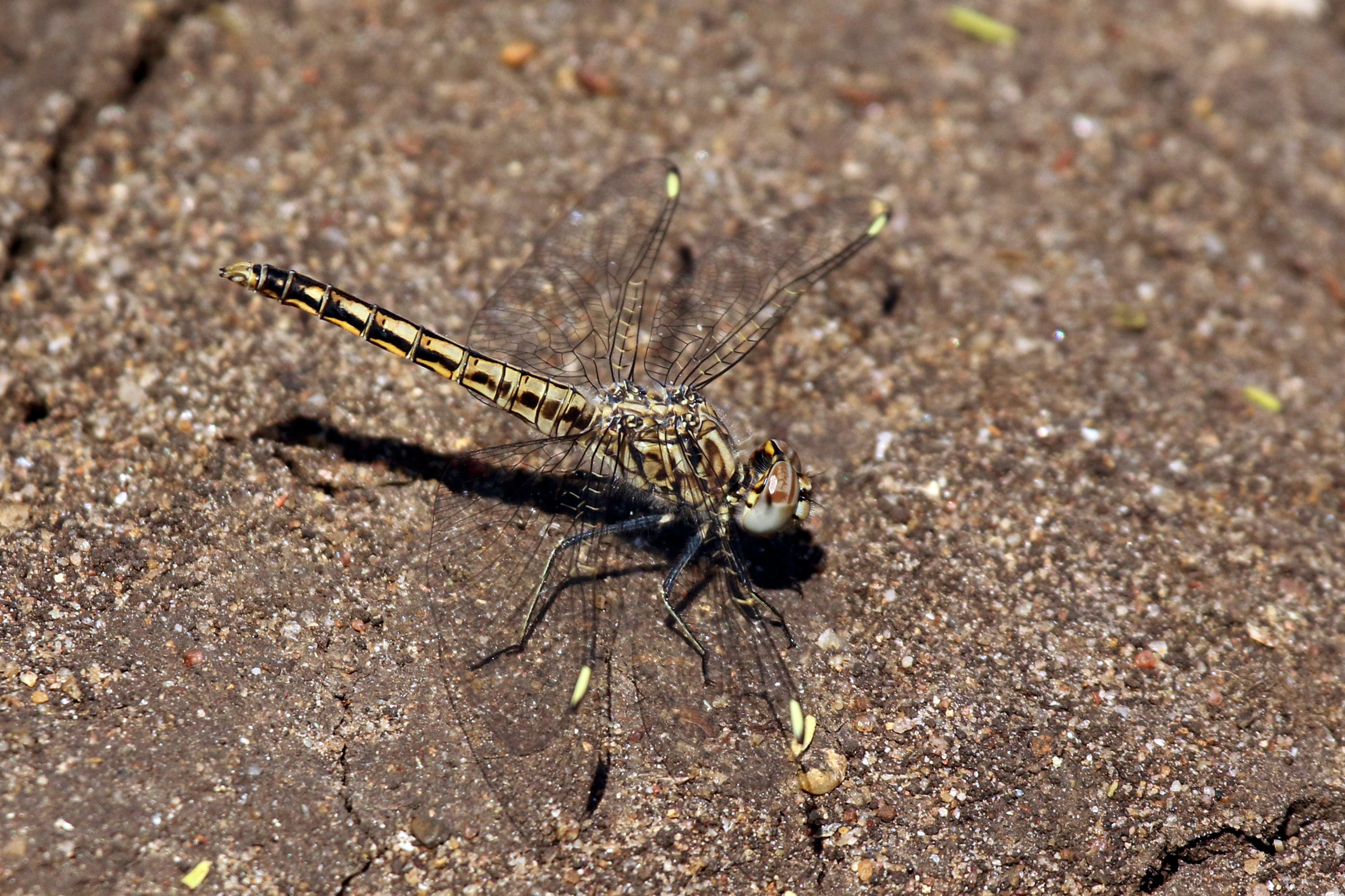
- Female, uMkhuze Game Reserve, KwaZulu Natal, South Africa

Conservation status
- Least Concern (IUCN 3.1)

Scientific classification
- Kingdom: Animalia
- Phylum: Arthropoda
- Class: Insecta
- Order: Odonata
- Infraorder: Anisoptera
- Family: Libellulidae
- Genus: Brachythemis
- Species: B. leucosticta

Binomial name
- Brachythemis leucosticta (Burmeister, 1839)

Synonyms
- Libellula leucosticta Burmeister, 1839

= Brachythemis leucosticta =

Species of dragonfly

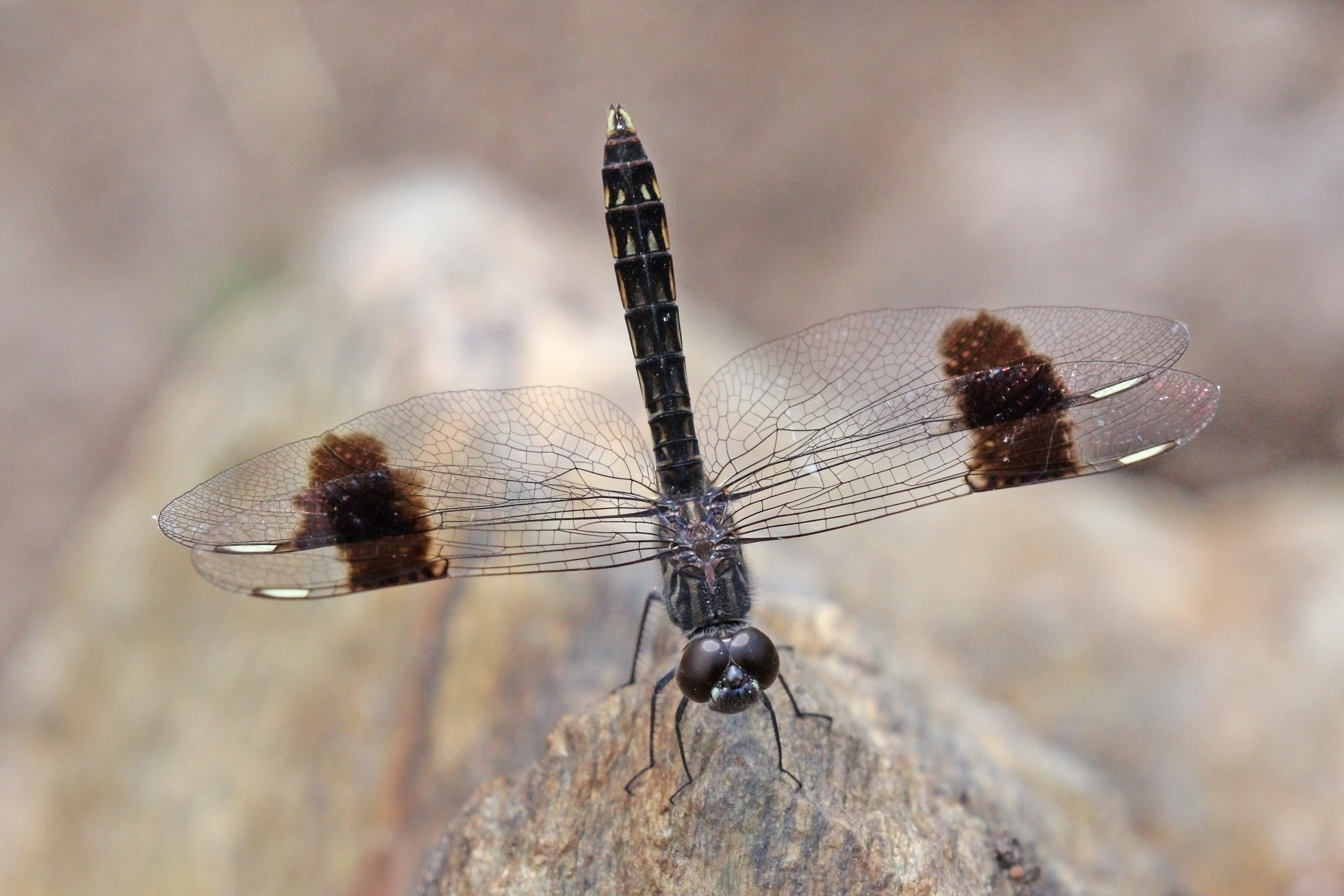
immature male

Brachythemis leucosticta, the banded groundling or Southern banded groundling, is a species of dragonfly belonging to the family Libellulidae. It is found in Sub-Saharan Africa.

== Taxonomy ==
Brachythemis leucosticta was first formally described as Libellula leucosticta in 1839 by the German entomologist Hermann Burmeister with its type locality designated as Port Natal. It was long considered that there was a single species, the banded groundling, but in 2009 they were split into two species; the Southern banded groundling (B. leucosticta) and the Northern Banded Groundling (B. impartita) with a wide area of overlap in central Africa.

== Description ==
Brachythemis leucosticta is a small species of dragonfly with a length of up to 33 mm (1.3 in) and a wingspan of up to 57 mm (2.2 in). The males have a completely black abdomen and thorax, pterostigmata which are bicoloured including yellow, a very dark brown or blackish band near the tip of each wing and a black face and eyes. The females have a yellow and black thorax and abdomen the colour becoming less bright in older individuals and they have brown banded eyes.

== Distribution and habitat ==
Brachythemis leucosticta is found in East and Central Africa, and its presence has been confirmed in Angola, Benin, Botswana, Burkina Faso, Burundi, The Democratic Republic of the Congo, Eswatini, Ethiopia, Gambia, Ghana, Kenya, Madagascar, Malawi, Mozambique, Namibia, Niger, Rwanda, Senegal, Somalia, South Africa, Tanzania, Uganda, Zambia and Zimbabwe. It may also occur in Central African Republic, Chad, Congo, Côte d'Ivoire, Equatorial Guinea, Guinea, Guinea-Bissau, Mali, Mauritania, Nigeria, South Sudan and Sudan. In South Africa it is found in the northern and eastern parts and is largely absent from the Cape region with a few scattered records in the Eastern Cape and a single record from the Western Cape. It is found round small pools in open or savannah area, these pools may or may not have aquatic or emergent vegetation. The females and young males may be encountered some distance from water.

== Biology ==
Brachythemis leucosticta prefers to be on or near the ground and will sit in the open. It is a tame species which often follows larger animals, including humans, catching small insects flushed by the larger animals as they walk through the grass. They are rather sociable and gather in mixed sex aggregations. In South Africa the adults are most active between September and May but in more tropical areas the adults are active throughout the year.
