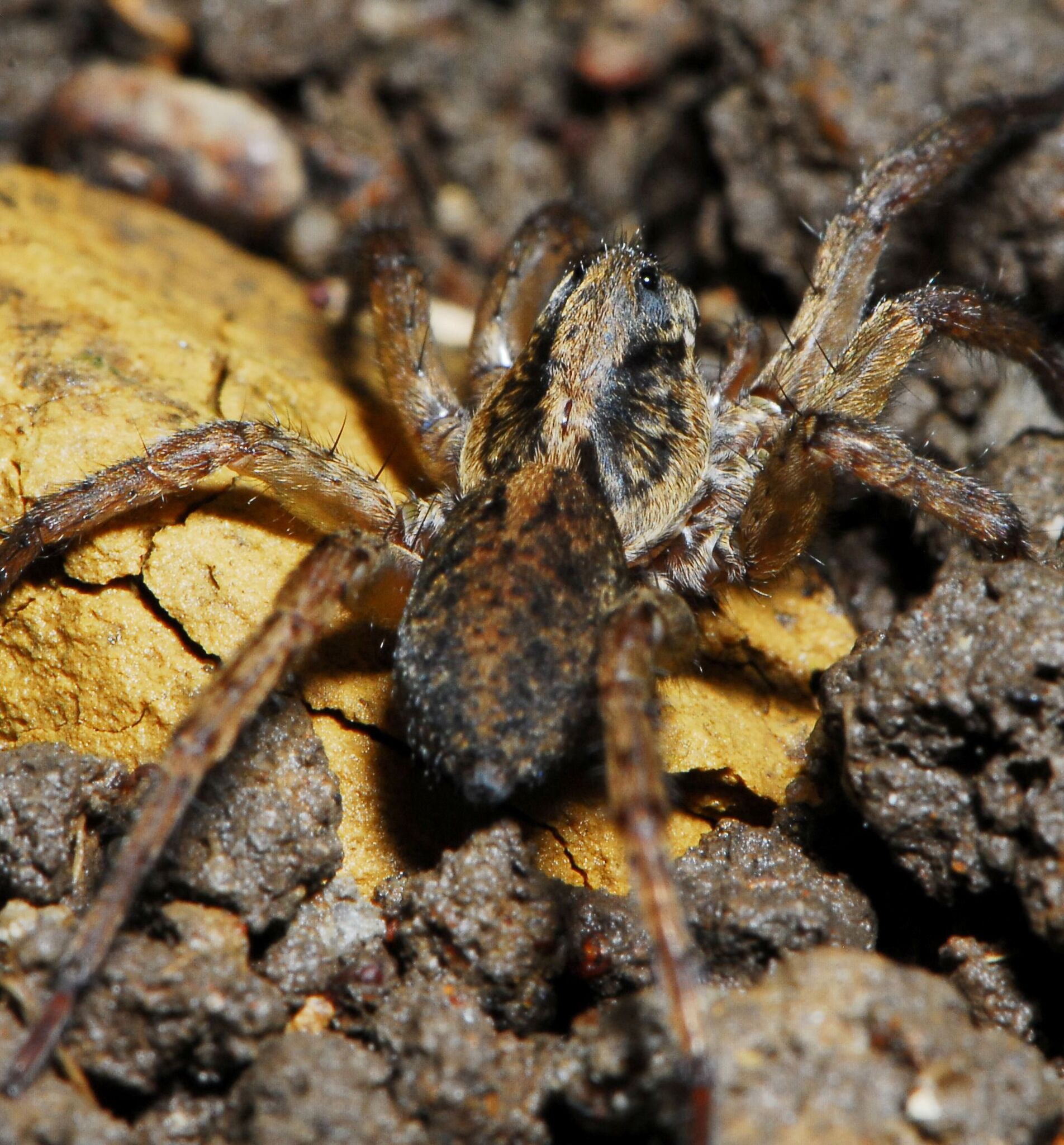
- male
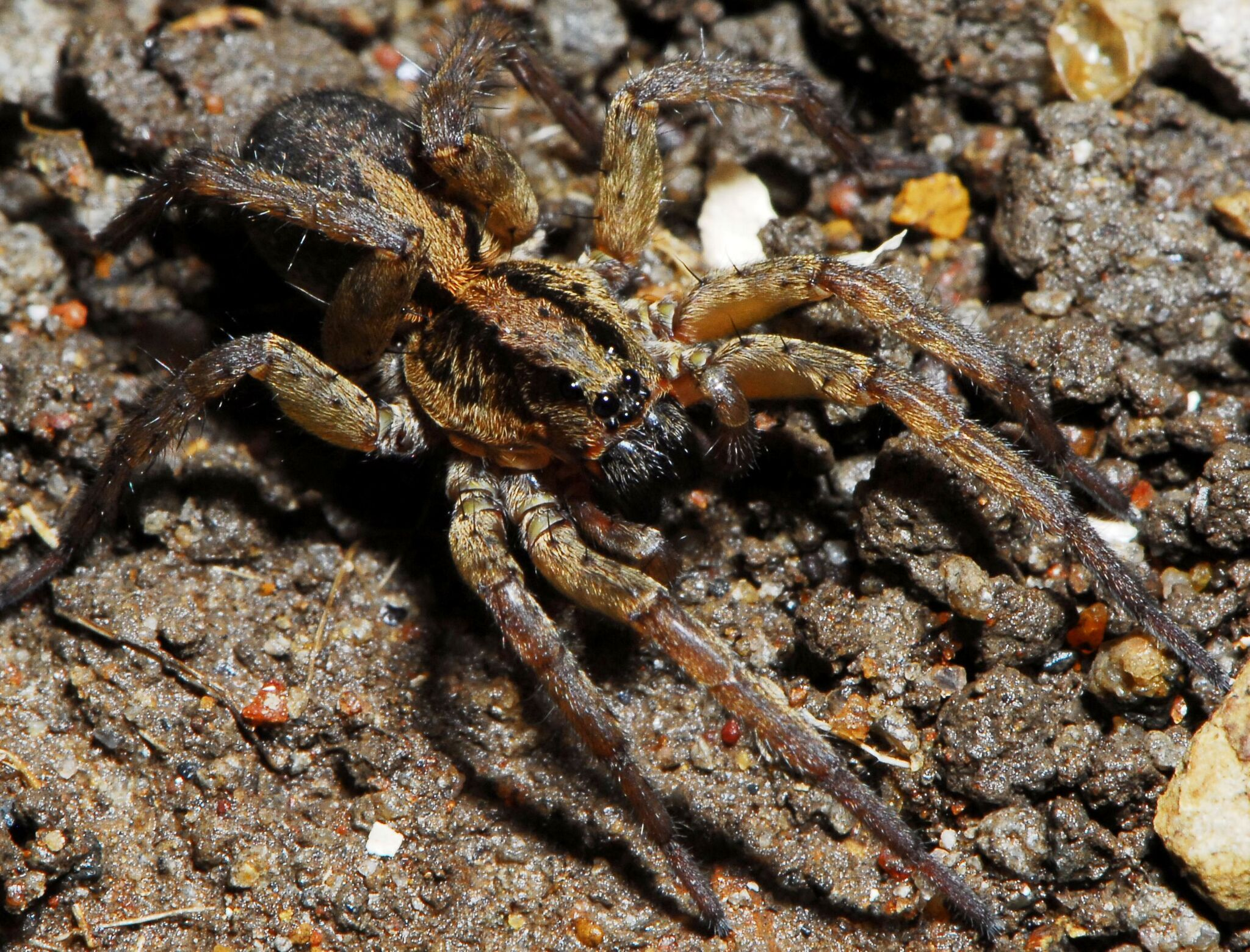
- male

Scientific classification
- Kingdom: Animalia
- Phylum: Arthropoda
- Subphylum: Chelicerata
- Class: Arachnida
- Order: Araneae
- Infraorder: Araneomorphae
- Family: Lycosidae
- Genus: Hogna
- Species: H. simoni

Binomial name
- Hogna simoni Roewer, 1959

= Hogna simoni =

Spotted burrow-living wolf spider

Species of spider

Hogna simoni is a species of spider in the family Lycosidae. It is found in Africa and is commonly known as the spotted burrow-living wolf spider.

== Distribution ==
Hogna simoni is found in Cameroon, the Democratic Republic of the Congo, Angola, and South Africa.

In South Africa, it is known only from KwaZulu-Natal province.

== Habitat and ecology ==
This species is a free-living ground dweller that lives in open burrows.

In South Africa, it has been sampled from the Savanna biome at an altitude of 131 m.

== Description ==
Hogna simoni is known from both sexes.

The cephalothorax has a red-brown eye field with dark radial bands, broad medially wavy margins, white-coated marginal bands, and a narrow white hairy median band barely broadened in front of the striae.

The abdomen is dorsally rusty yellow and pale hairy, with a broad lanceolate reddish-yellow median band in front that has whisker-like dot flecks. Behind this are five to six whisker-like angular flecks.

The legs are rusty yellow and white hairy, with the femora dorsally slightly darker.

The chelicerae are black and frontally whitish hairy.

== Conservation ==
The species has a large geographic range in Africa and is protected in uMkhuze Game Reserve in South Africa.

== Etymology ==
The species is named after Eugène Simon, a prominent French arachnologist who made extensive contributions to spider taxonomy.

== Taxonomy ==
The species was described by Roewer in 1959 from Zaire, now the Democratic Republic of the Congo.
