= Zelotes zonognathus =

Eierfontein Dark Ground Spider

Conservation status
- Least Concern (SANBI Red List)

Scientific classification
- Kingdom: Animalia
- Phylum: Arthropoda
- Subphylum: Chelicerata
- Class: Arachnida
- Order: Araneae
- Infraorder: Araneomorphae
- Family: Gnaphosidae
- Genus: Zelotes
- Species: Z. zonognathus

Binomial name
- Zelotes zonognathus (Purcell, 1907)

Synonyms
- Melanophora zonognathus Purcell, 1907

Species of spider

Zelotes zonognathus is a species of spider in the family Gnaphosidae. It is commonly known as Eierfontein dark ground spider and occurs widely in Africa.

== Distribution ==
Zelotes zonognathus is found in DRC, Ivory Coast, Mali, Namibia, Zimbabwe, and South Africa. In South Africa, it is recorded from five provinces: Free State, KwaZulu-Natal, Limpopo, Northern Cape, and North West.

== Habitat and ecology ==
The species occurs at altitudes ranging from 83 to 1,516 m above sea level. They are free-running ground spiders found under stones during the day and inhabit the Grassland and Savanna biomes.

== Conservation ==
Zelotes zonognathus is listed as Least Concern by the South African National Biodiversity Institute due to its wide range. The species is protected in Erfenisdam Nature Reserve, Sandveld Nature Reserve, Ndumo Game Reserve, and uMkhuze Game Reserve. There are no significant threats to the species.

== Etymology ==
The species is named after the farm Eierfontein near Hanover where it was originally collected.

== Taxonomy ==
The species was originally described by Purcell in 1907 from the farm Eierfontein near Hanover as Melanophora zonognathus. It was revised by Moira FitzPatrick in 2007 and is known from both sexes.
