= Zelotes namibensis =

Namib Dark Ground Spider

Conservation status
- Least Concern (SANBI Red List)

Scientific classification
- Kingdom: Animalia
- Phylum: Arthropoda
- Subphylum: Chelicerata
- Class: Arachnida
- Order: Araneae
- Infraorder: Araneomorphae
- Family: Gnaphosidae
- Genus: Zelotes
- Species: Z. namibensis

Binomial name
- Zelotes namibensis FitzPatrick, 2007

Species of spider

Zelotes namibensis is a species of spider in the family Gnaphosidae. It is found in southern Africa and is commonly known as the Namib dark ground spider.

== Distribution ==
Zelotes namibensis occurs in Namibia and South Africa. In South Africa, it is recorded from KwaZulu-Natal at the iSimangaliso Wetland Park, specifically at uMkhuze Game Reserve. The species occurs at an altitude of 54 m above sea level.

== Habitat and ecology ==
Zelotes namibensis is a free-living ground dweller sampled from the Savanna biome.

== Conservation ==
Zelotes namibensis is listed as Least Concern by the South African National Biodiversity Institute due to its wide geographical range in Southern Africa. There are no significant threats to the species, and it is protected in the uMkhuze Game Reserve.

== Taxonomy ==
The species was described by FitzPatrick in 2007 from Namibia. The species is known from both sexes.
