= Hamataliwa unca =

Scientific classification
- Kingdom: Animalia
- Phylum: Arthropoda
- Subphylum: Chelicerata
- Class: Arachnida
- Order: Araneae
- Infraorder: Araneomorphae
- Family: Oxyopidae
- Genus: Hamataliwa
- Species: H. unca

Binomial name
- Hamataliwa unca Brady, 1964

Species of spider

Hamataliwa unca is a species of lynx spider in the family Oxyopidae. It is found in the United States.
