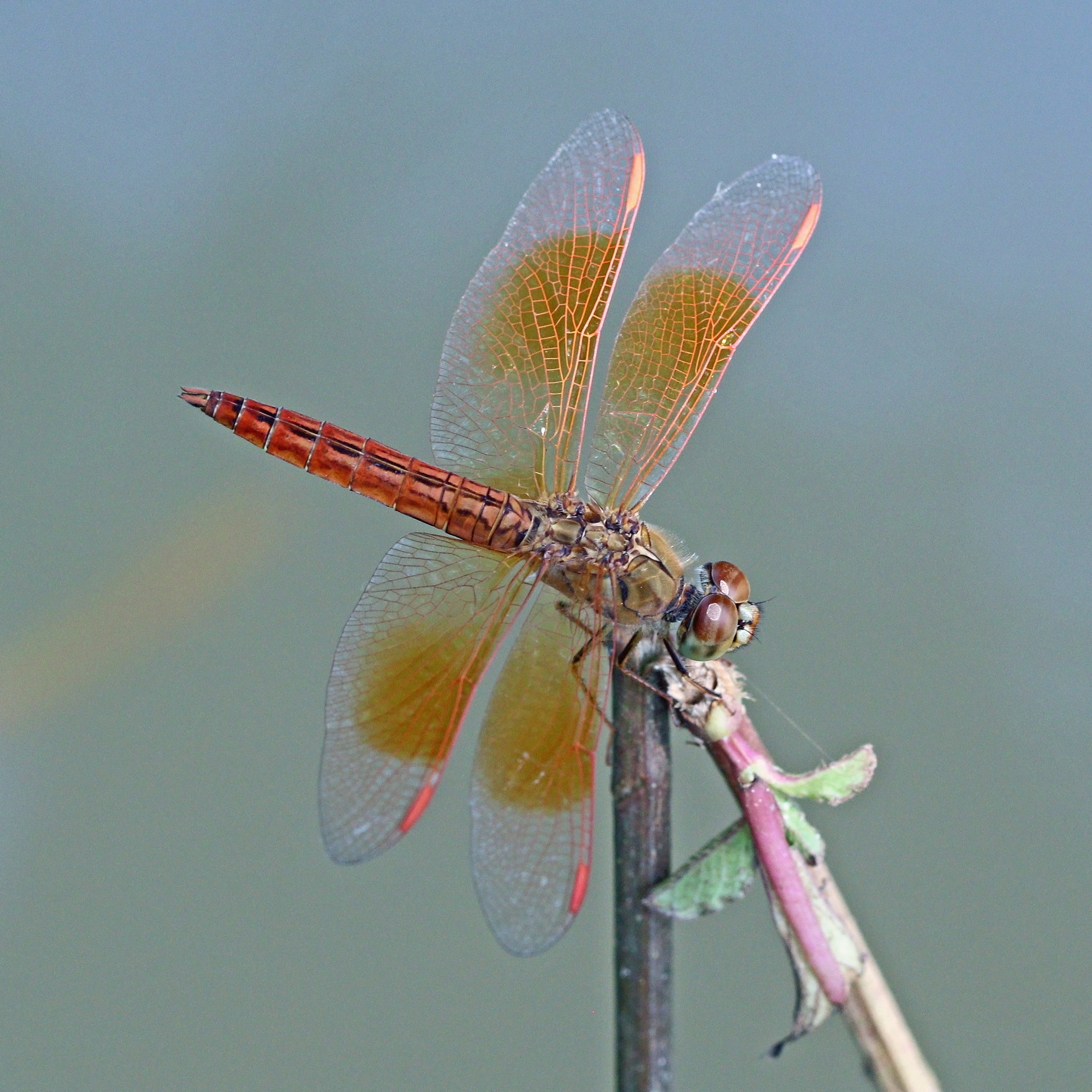
- Male
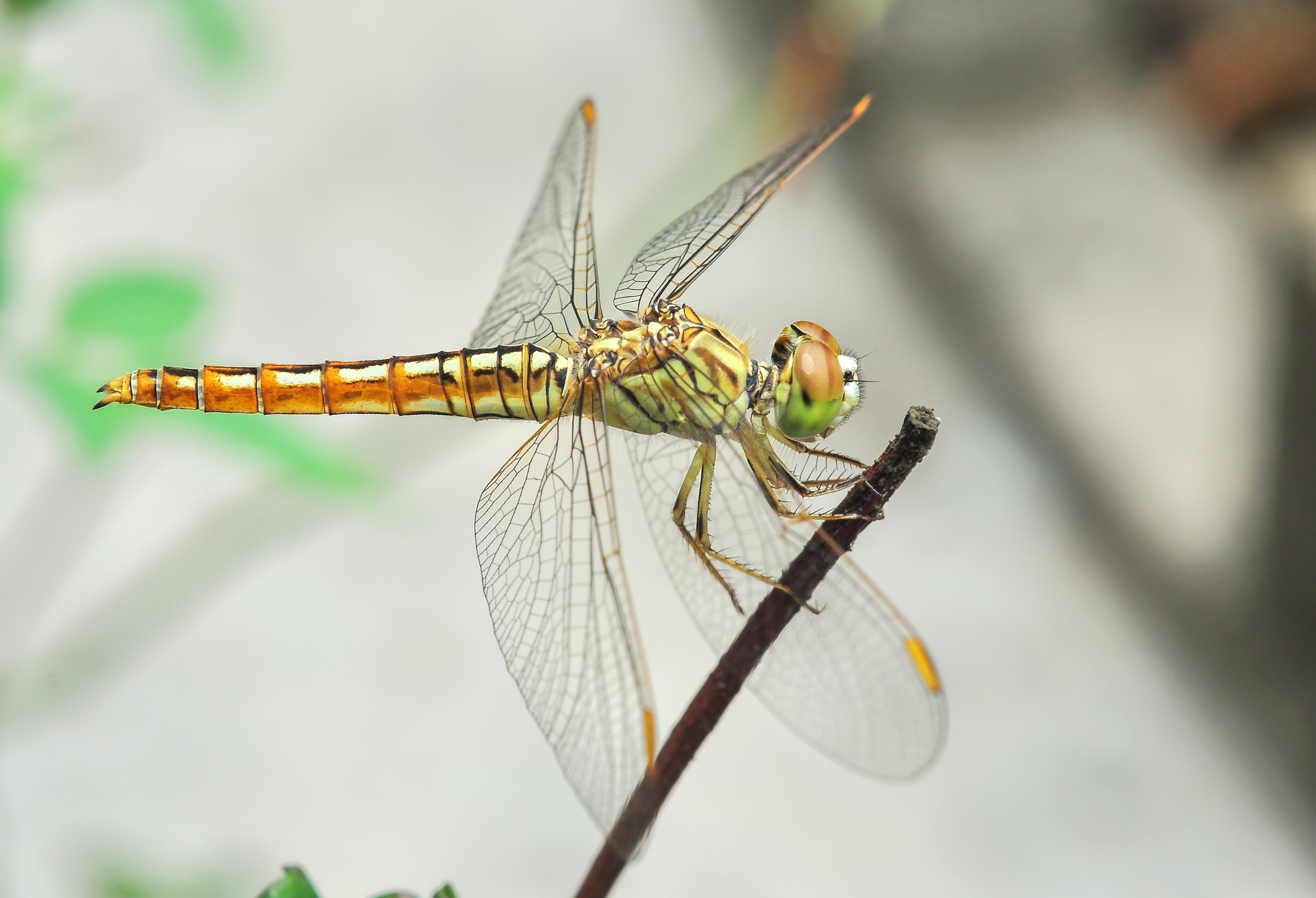
- Female

Conservation status
- Least Concern (IUCN 3.1)

Scientific classification
- Kingdom: Animalia
- Phylum: Arthropoda
- Clade: Pancrustacea
- Class: Insecta
- Order: Odonata
- Infraorder: Anisoptera
- Family: Libellulidae
- Genus: Brachythemis
- Species: B. contaminata

Binomial name
- Brachythemis contaminata (Fabricius, 1793)

Synonyms
- Libellula truncatula Rambur, 1842

= Brachythemis contaminata =

Ditch jewel

Species of dragonfly

Brachythemis contaminata, ditch jewel, is a species of dragonfly in the family Libellulidae. It is found in many Asian countries.

== Description and habitat ==
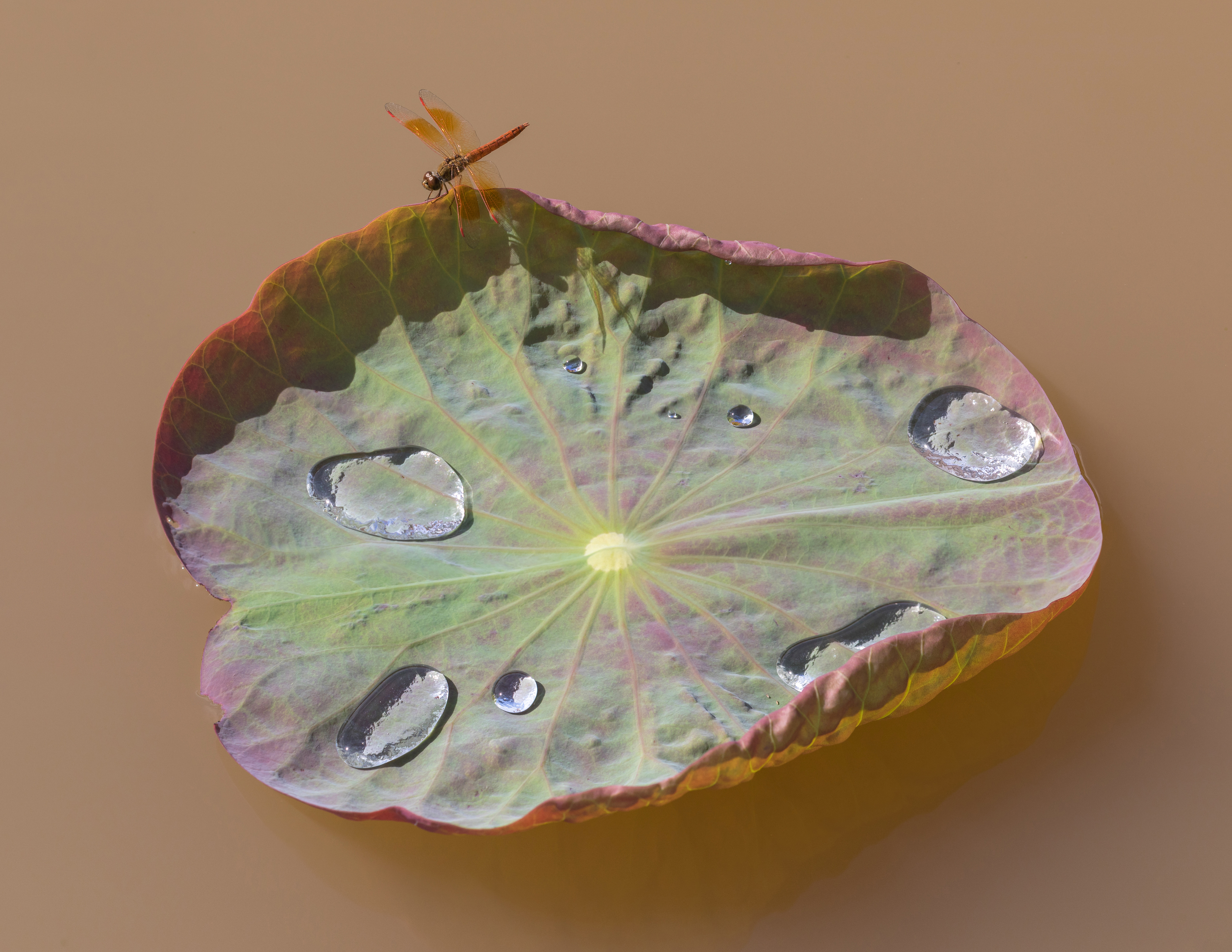
Brachythemis contaminata on Nelumbo nucifera leaf, in a pond

It is a small dragonfly with brown-capped yellowish-green eyes. Its thorax is olivaceous-brown, marked with a reddish-brown humeral stripe and two brownish stripes on each side. Wings are transparent; but with a broad bright orange fascia extending from base to within 2 to 3 cells of reddish pterostigma. Abdomen is ochreous-red, marked with dorsal and sub-dorsal brown stripes. Anal appendages are in reddish-brown. Female is similar to the male; but in pale yellowish-green color. Wings are transparent, tinted with yellow at extreme base;, but the bright orange fascia seen in the male absent.

It breeds in weedy ponds, lakes, and slowly moving streams; especially in sluggish waters. It is very common along sewage canals, tanks, ponds and ditches.

This type of dragonfly has the smallest genome of its kind. The entire circular genome is 15,056 bp in length and represents the smallest in presently known odonatan mitogenomes. (Yu et al 2014). Its first species to have a complete mitochondrial genome among the family Libellulidae. This helps learn more about their genetics, and their evolution.

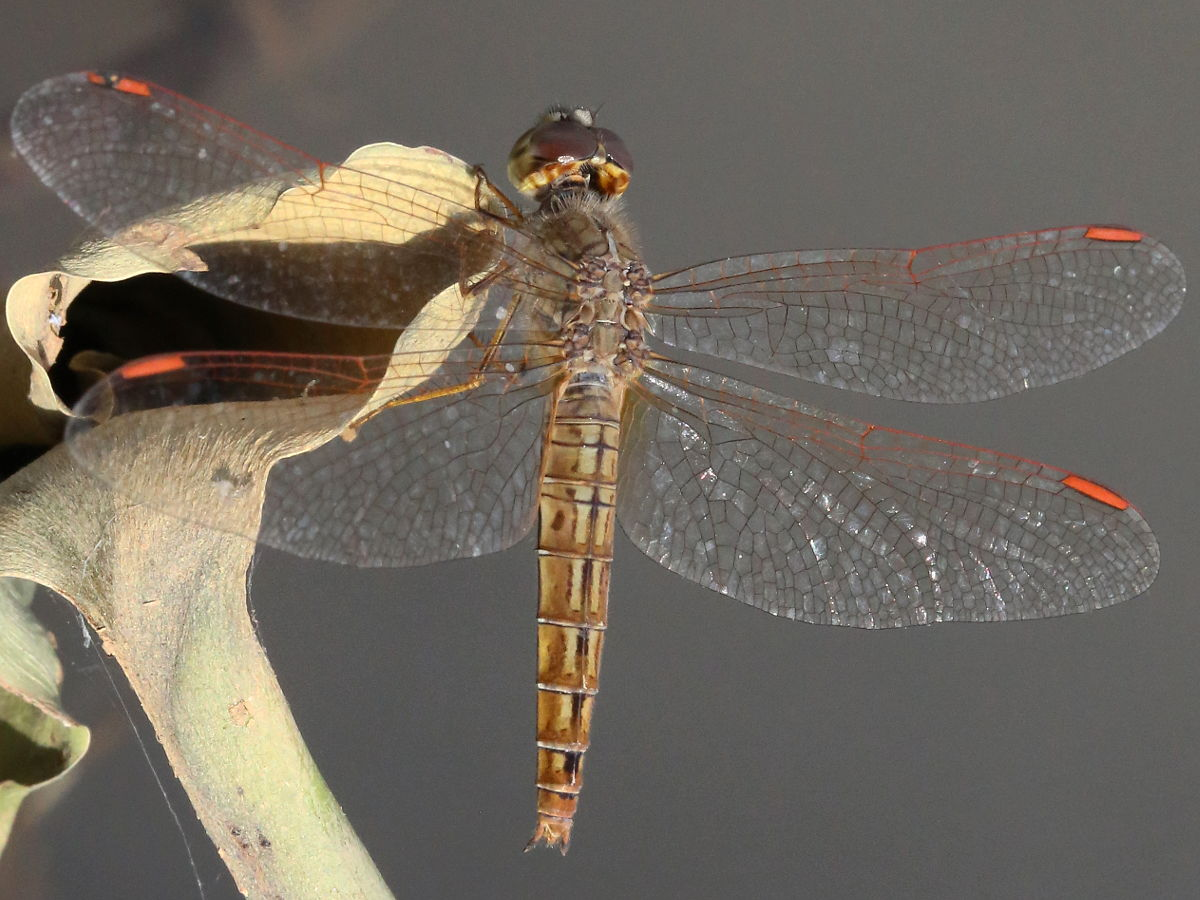
Female, Thailand

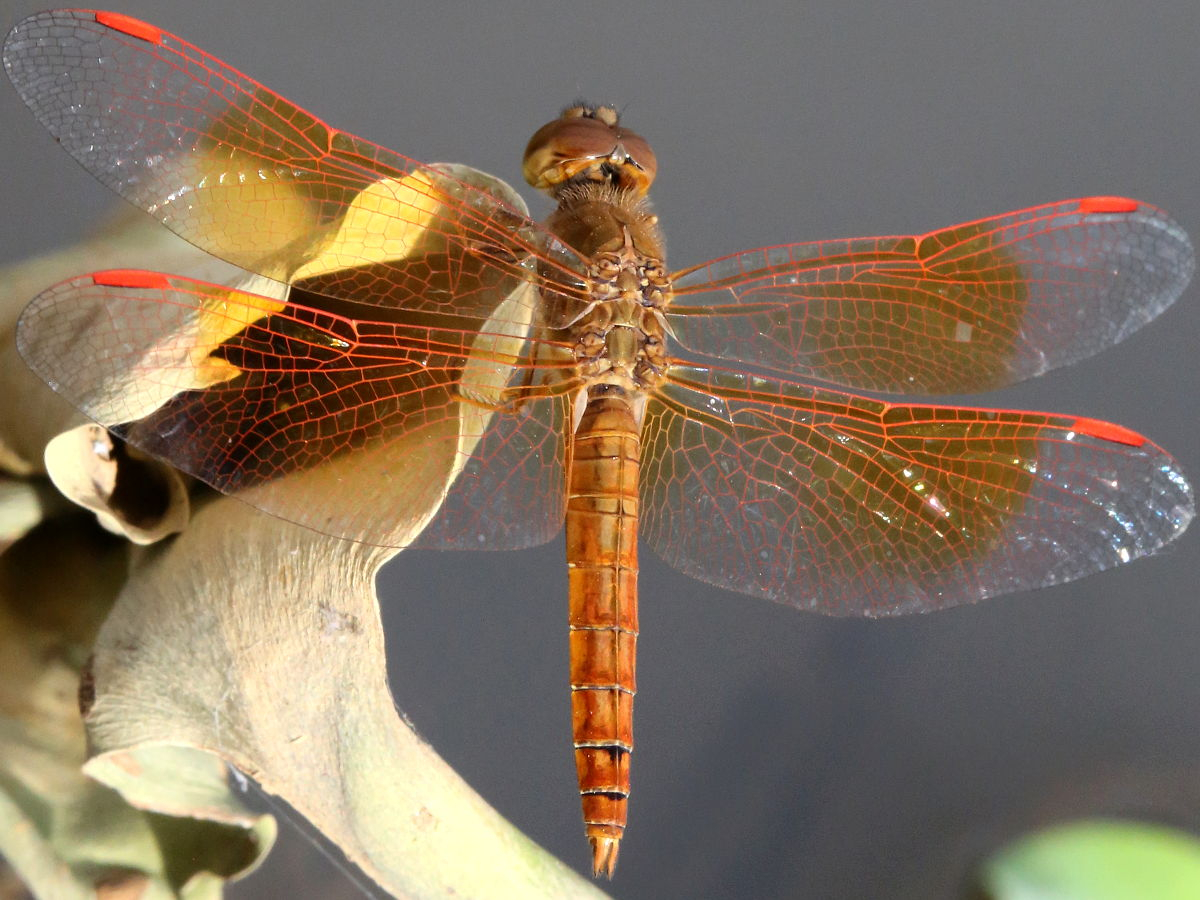
Male, Thailand

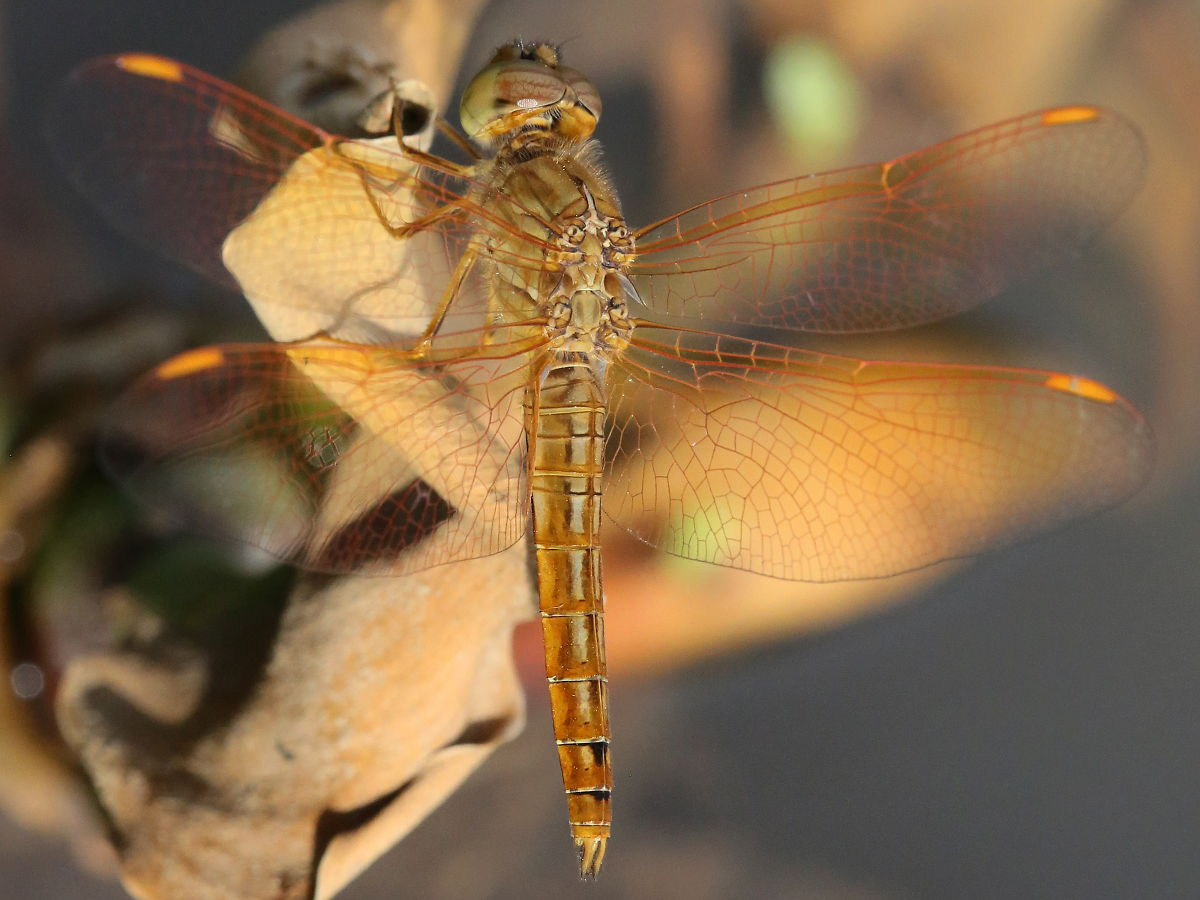
Teneral male, Thailand

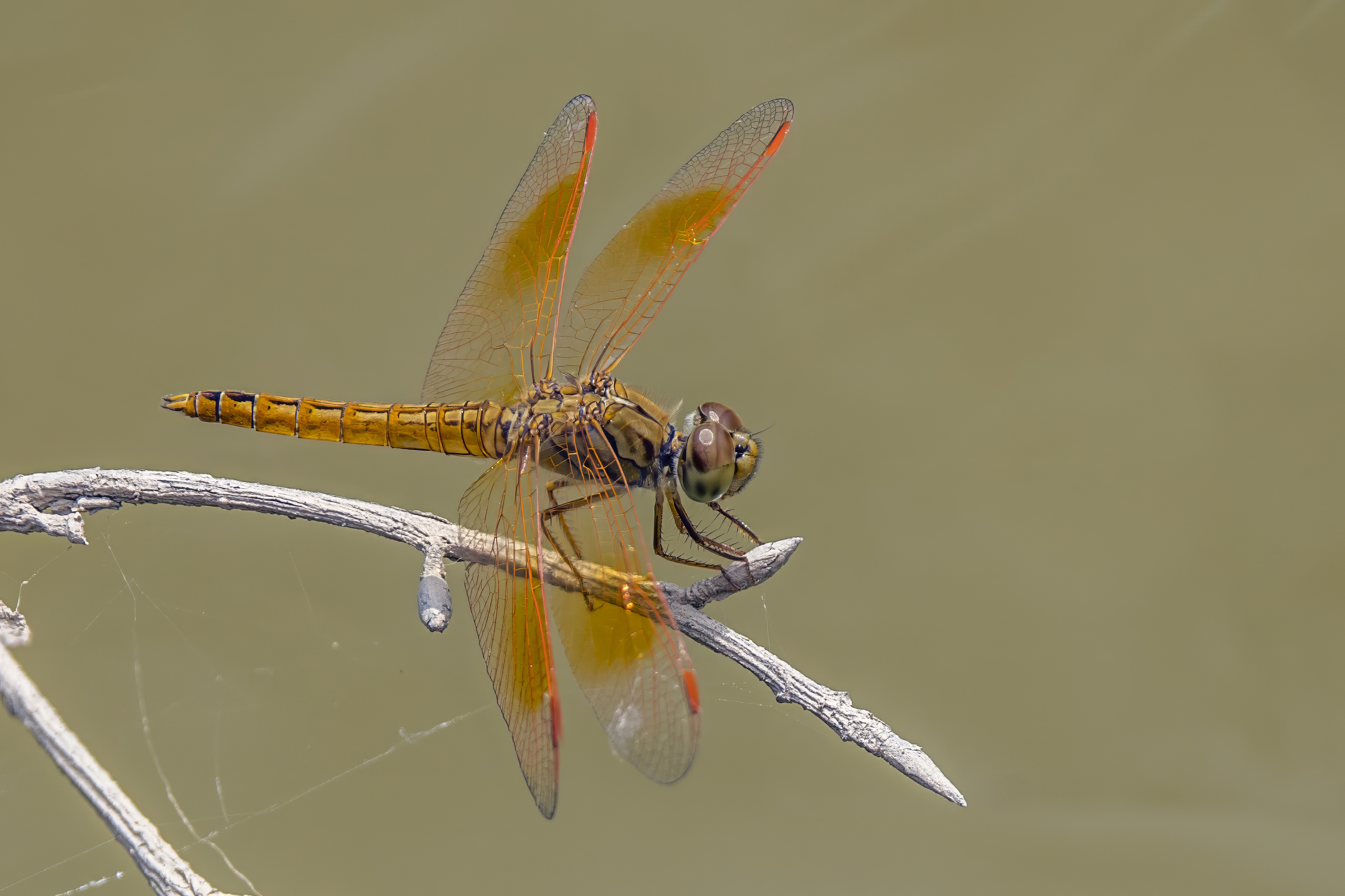
Immature male, Vietnam

== See also ==
- List of odonates of Sri Lanka
- List of odonates of India
- List of odonata of Kerala
