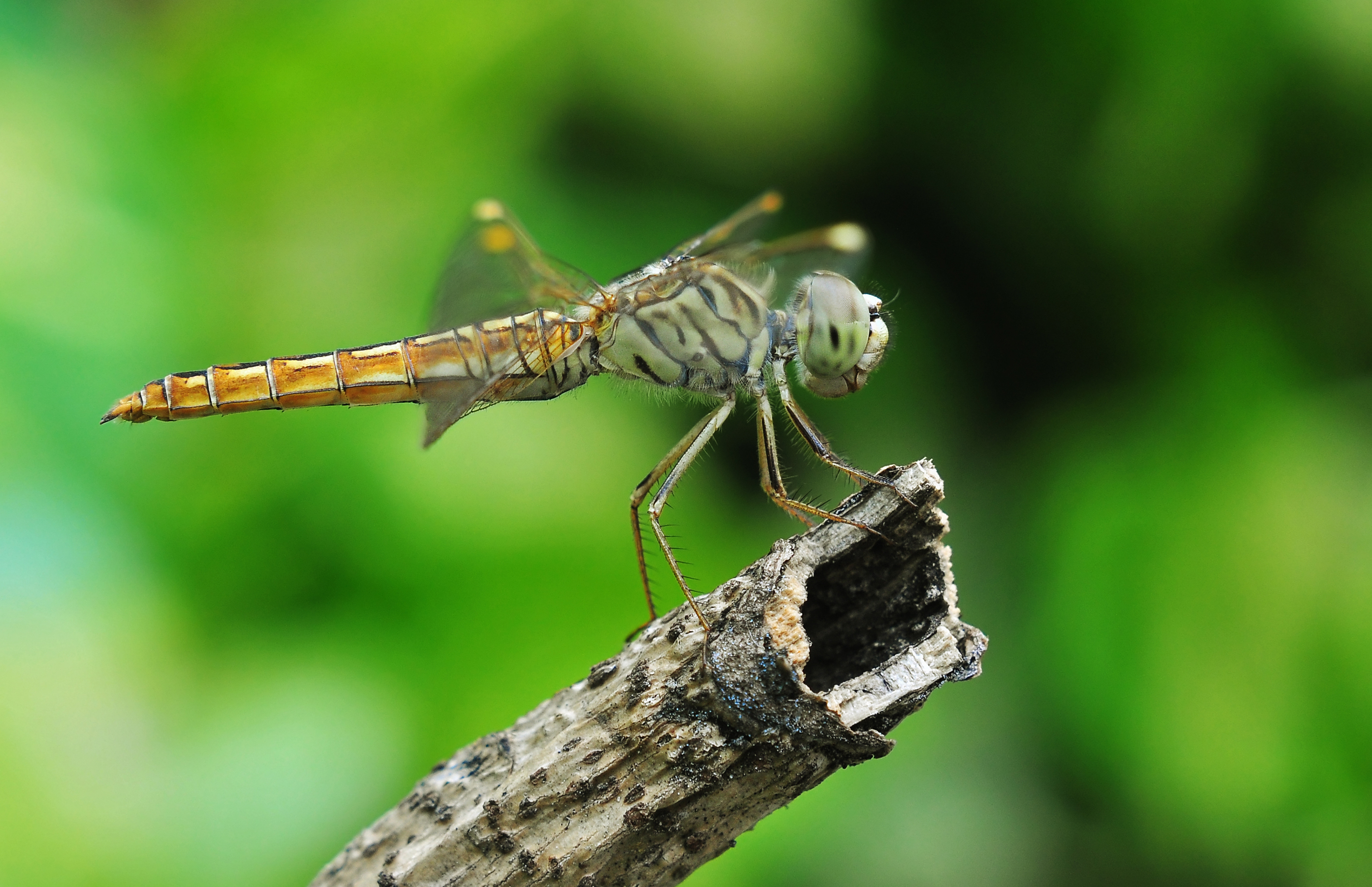
- Ditch jewel (Brachythemis contaminata) female

Scientific classification
- Kingdom: Animalia
- Phylum: Arthropoda
- Clade: Pancrustacea
- Class: Insecta
- Order: Odonata
- Infraorder: Anisoptera
- Superfamily: Libelluloidea
- Family: Libellulidae
- Subfamily: Sympetrinae
- Genus: Brachythemis; Brauer, 1868

Type species
- Libellula contaminata Fabricius, 1793

= Brachythemis =

Genus of dragonflies

Brachythemis is a genus of dragonflies in the family Libellulidae. They are commonly known as groundlings.

== Species ==
The genus contains the following species:

Male	Female	Scientific name	Common name	Distribution
		Brachythemis contaminata (Fabricius, 1793)	ditch jewel	Asia
		Brachythemis fuscopalliata (Selys, 1887)	dark-winged groundling	Iran, Iraq, Israel, Syria, and Turkey.
		Brachythemis impartita (Karsch, 1890)	northern banded groundling	southern Europe and the Middle East.
		Brachythemis lacustris (Kirby, 1889)	red groundling	Angola, Botswana, Burkina Faso, the Democratic Republic of the Congo, Ivory Coast, Equatorial Guinea, Ethiopia, Gambia, Ghana, Guinea, Kenya, Liberia, Malawi, Mozambique, Namibia, Niger, Nigeria, Senegal, Somalia, South Africa, Sudan, Tanzania, Togo, Uganda, Zambia, Zimbabwe, and possibly Burundi.
		Brachythemis leucosticta (Burmeister, 1839)	banded groundling	Eastern and central Africa and Madagascar.
		Brachythemis wilsoni Pinhey, 1952	Wilson's groundling	Burkina Faso, Cameroon, the Democratic Republic of the Congo, Ivory Coast, Nigeria, Sudan, Togo, Uganda, possibly Botswana, and possibly Kenya

== Taxonomy ==
The banded groundling is one of Africa's most familiar and abundant dragonflies. It has only recently been identified as being two separate species, B. leucosticta and the new taxon B. impartita.
