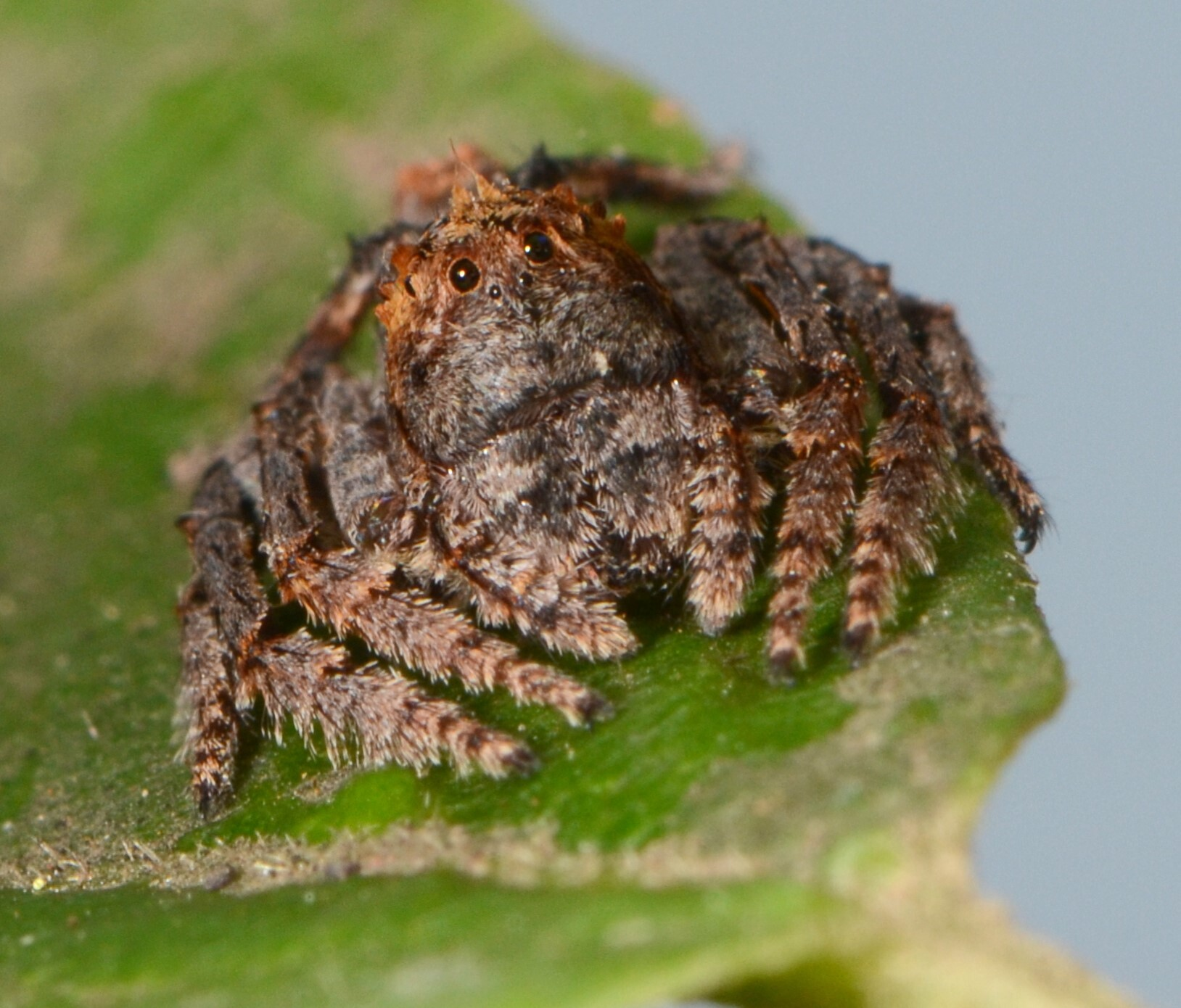
- Female H. rostrifrons
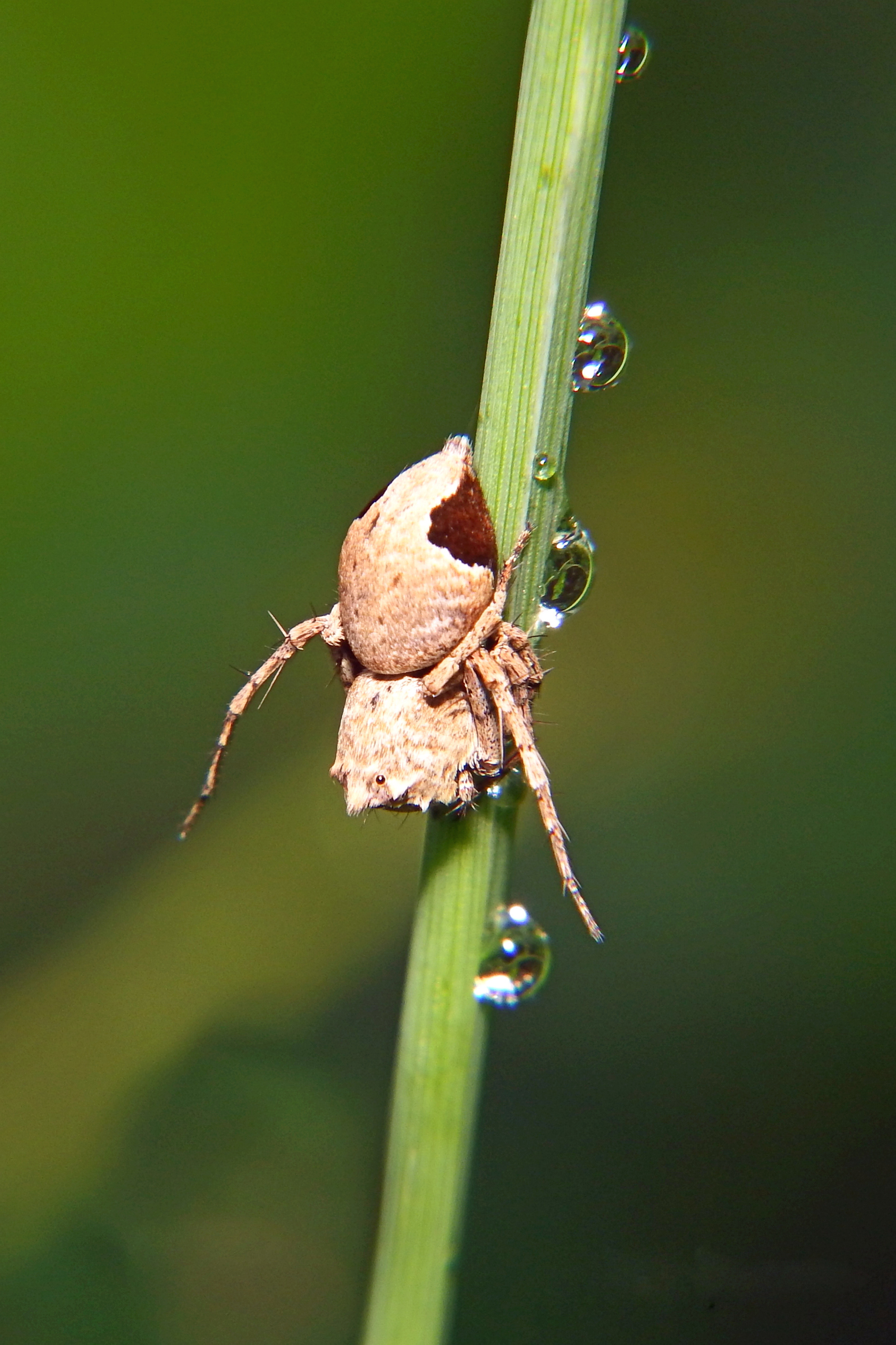
- Hamataliwa sp.

Scientific classification
- Kingdom: Animalia
- Phylum: Arthropoda
- Subphylum: Chelicerata
- Class: Arachnida
- Order: Araneae
- Infraorder: Araneomorphae
- Family: Oxyopidae
- Genus: Hamataliwa; Keyserling, 1887

Type species
- H. grisea Keyserling, 1887

Species
- 90, see text

Synonyms
- Megullia Thorell, 1897; Oxyopeidon O. Pickard-Cambridge, 1894

= Hamataliwa =

Genus of spiders

Hamataliwa is a genus of lynx spiders that was first described by Eugen von Keyserling in 1887.

== Distribution ==
Most species in this genus are found in Central and South America (Mexico to Brazil) or Asia (India to China and Indonesia).

Only three species reach into North America: H. grisea, H. helia and H. unica.

H. cooki and H. monroei are endemic to Australia. Five species are endemic to Africa, from Ethiopia to South Africa.

== Species ==
As of September 2025, this genus includes ninety species:

- Hamataliwa albibarbis (Mello-Leitão, 1947) – Brazil
- Hamataliwa argyrescens Mello-Leitão, 1929 – Brazil
- Hamataliwa aurita Zhang, Zhu & Song, 2005 – China
- Hamataliwa banksi (Mello-Leitão, 1928) – Mexico to Costa Rica
- Hamataliwa barroana (Chamberlin & Ivie, 1936) – Mexico to Panama
- Hamataliwa bicolor (Mello-Leitão, 1929) – Brazil
- Hamataliwa bituberculata (Mello-Leitão, 1929) – Brazil, Guyana
- Hamataliwa brunnea (F. O. Pickard-Cambridge, 1902) – Mexico
- Hamataliwa buelowae Mello-Leitão, 1945 – Argentina
- Hamataliwa bufo Brady, 1970 – Panama
- Hamataliwa catenula Deeleman-Reinhold, 2009 – Indonesia, Malaysia
- Hamataliwa caudata Mello-Leitão, 1929 – Brazil
- Hamataliwa cavata (Kraus, 1955) – El Salvador
- Hamataliwa cheta Brady, 1970 – Guatemala
- Hamataliwa circularis (Kraus, 1955) – El Salvador
- Hamataliwa communicans (Chamberlin, 1925) – Hispaniola
- Hamataliwa cooki Grimshaw, 1989 – Australia
- Hamataliwa cordata Zhang, Zhu & Song, 2005 – China
- Hamataliwa cordivulva Lo, Cheng & Lin, 2024 – Taiwan
- Hamataliwa cornuta (Thorell, 1895) – Myanmar
- Hamataliwa crista Amulya, Sebastian & Sudhikumar, 2022 – India
- Hamataliwa crocata Brady, 1970 – Panama
- Hamataliwa cucullata Tang, Wang & Peng, 2012 – China
- Hamataliwa difficilis (O. Pickard-Cambridge, 1894) – Mexico
- Hamataliwa dimidiata (Soares & Camargo, 1948) – Brazil
- Hamataliwa dubia (Mello-Leitão, 1929) – Brazil
- Hamataliwa facilis (O. Pickard-Cambridge, 1894) – Guatemala, Mexico
- Hamataliwa flebilis (O. Pickard-Cambridge, 1894) – Mexico to Panama
- Hamataliwa floreni Deeleman-Reinhold, 2009 – Indonesia, Malaysia
- Hamataliwa foveata Tang & Li, 2012 – China, Taiwan
- Hamataliwa fronticornis (Lessert, 1927) – Democratic Republic of the Congo, South Africa
- Hamataliwa fronto (Thorell, 1890) – Indonesia
- Hamataliwa globosa (F. O. Pickard-Cambridge, 1902) – Mexico to Panama
- Hamataliwa grisea Keyserling, 1887 – Mexico, United States (type species)
- Hamataliwa haytiana (Chamberlin, 1925) – Hispaniola
- Hamataliwa helia (Chamberlin, 1929) – Indonesia, Thailand, Mexico, United States, Guyana, Borneo
- Hamataliwa hellia Dhali, Saha & Raychaudhuri, 2017 – India
- Hamataliwa hista Brady, 1970 – Panama
- Hamataliwa ignifuga Deeleman-Reinhold, 2009 – Borneo
- Hamataliwa incompta (Thorell, 1895) – Southeast Asia, India
- Hamataliwa indica Sen & Sureshan, 2022 – India
- Hamataliwa kulczynskii (Lessert, 1915) – Ethiopia, Botswana, Eswatini, South Africa
- Hamataliwa labialis (Song, 1991) – China
- Hamataliwa laeta (O. Pickard-Cambridge, 1894) – Mexico
- Hamataliwa latifrons (Thorell, 1890) – Indonesia
- Hamataliwa leporauris Lo, Cheng & Lin, 2024 – Taiwan
- Hamataliwa maculipes (Bryant, 1923) – Antigua and Barbuda
- Hamataliwa manca Tang & Li, 2012 – China
- Hamataliwa marmorata Simon, 1898 – Brazil, Paraguay
- Hamataliwa menglunensis Tang & Li, 2012 – China
- Hamataliwa micropunctata (Mello-Leitão, 1929) – Brazil
- Hamataliwa monroei Grimshaw, 1989 – Australia
- Hamataliwa nigrescens Mello-Leitão, 1929 – Brazil
- Hamataliwa nigritarsus Bryant, 1948 – Dominican Republic
- Hamataliwa nigriventris (Mello-Leitão, 1929) – Brazil
- Hamataliwa obtusa (Thorell, 1892) – Indonesia
- Hamataliwa oculata Tang & Li, 2012 – China
- Hamataliwa ovata (Biswas, Kundu, Kundu, Saha & Raychaudhuri, 1996) – India
- Hamataliwa pedicula Tang & Li, 2012 – China
- Hamataliwa penicillata Mello-Leitão, 1948 – Guyana
- Hamataliwa pentagona Tang & Li, 2012 – China, India
- Hamataliwa perdita Mello-Leitão, 1929 – Brazil
- Hamataliwa peterjaegeri Deeleman-Reinhold, 2009 – Borneo
- Hamataliwa pilulifera Tang & Li, 2012 – China
- Hamataliwa porcata (Simon, 1898) – Brazil
- Hamataliwa positiva Chamberlin, 1924 – Mexico
- Hamataliwa pricompta Deeleman-Reinhold, 2009 – Indonesia, Malaysia
- Hamataliwa puta (O. Pickard-Cambridge, 1894) – Mexico to Panama
- Hamataliwa quadrimaculata (Mello-Leitão, 1929) – Brazil
- Hamataliwa rana (Simon, 1898) – Caribbean
- Hamataliwa reticulata (Biswas, Kundu, Kundu, Saha & Raychaudhuri, 1996) – India
- Hamataliwa rhombiae Amulya & Sudhikumar, 2022 – India
- Hamataliwa rostrifrons (Lawrence, 1928) – Namibia, South Africa
- Hamataliwa rufocaligata Simon, 1898 – Djibouti, Ethiopia, Somalia, Botswana, South Africa
- Hamataliwa sagitta Amulya, Sebastian & Sudhikumar, 2024 – India
- Hamataliwa sanmenensis Song & Zheng, 1992 – China
- Hamataliwa schmidti Reimoser, 1939 – Mexico to Costa Rica
- Hamataliwa strandi (Lessert, 1923) – Mozambique, South Africa
- Hamataliwa subfacilis (O. Pickard-Cambridge, 1894) – Mexico
- Hamataliwa subhadrae (Tikader, 1970) – China, India
- Hamataliwa submanca Tang & Li, 2012 – China
- Hamataliwa torsiva Tang, Wang & Peng, 2012 – China
- Hamataliwa triangularis (Kraus, 1955) – El Salvador, Panama
- Hamataliwa tricuspidata (F. O. Pickard-Cambridge, 1902) – Costa Rica to Guyana
- Hamataliwa truncata (Thorell, 1897) – Vietnam
- Hamataliwa tuberculata (Chamberlin, 1925) – Cuba
- Hamataliwa unca Brady, 1964 – United States
- Hamataliwa ursa Brady, 1970 – Panama
- Hamataliwa vanbruggeni Deeleman-Reinhold, 2009 – Malaysia
- Hamataliwa wangi Lin & Li, 2022 – China
