= Hamataliwa helia =

Scientific classification
- Kingdom: Animalia
- Phylum: Arthropoda
- Subphylum: Chelicerata
- Class: Arachnida
- Order: Araneae
- Infraorder: Araneomorphae
- Family: Oxyopidae
- Genus: Hamataliwa
- Species: H. helia

Binomial name
- Hamataliwa helia (Chamberlin, 1929)

Species of spider

Hamataliwa helia is a species of lynx spider in the family Oxyopidae. It is found in the United States, Mexico, Guyana, Thailand, Malaysia (Sarawak), Brunei, and Indonesia (Sumatra).
