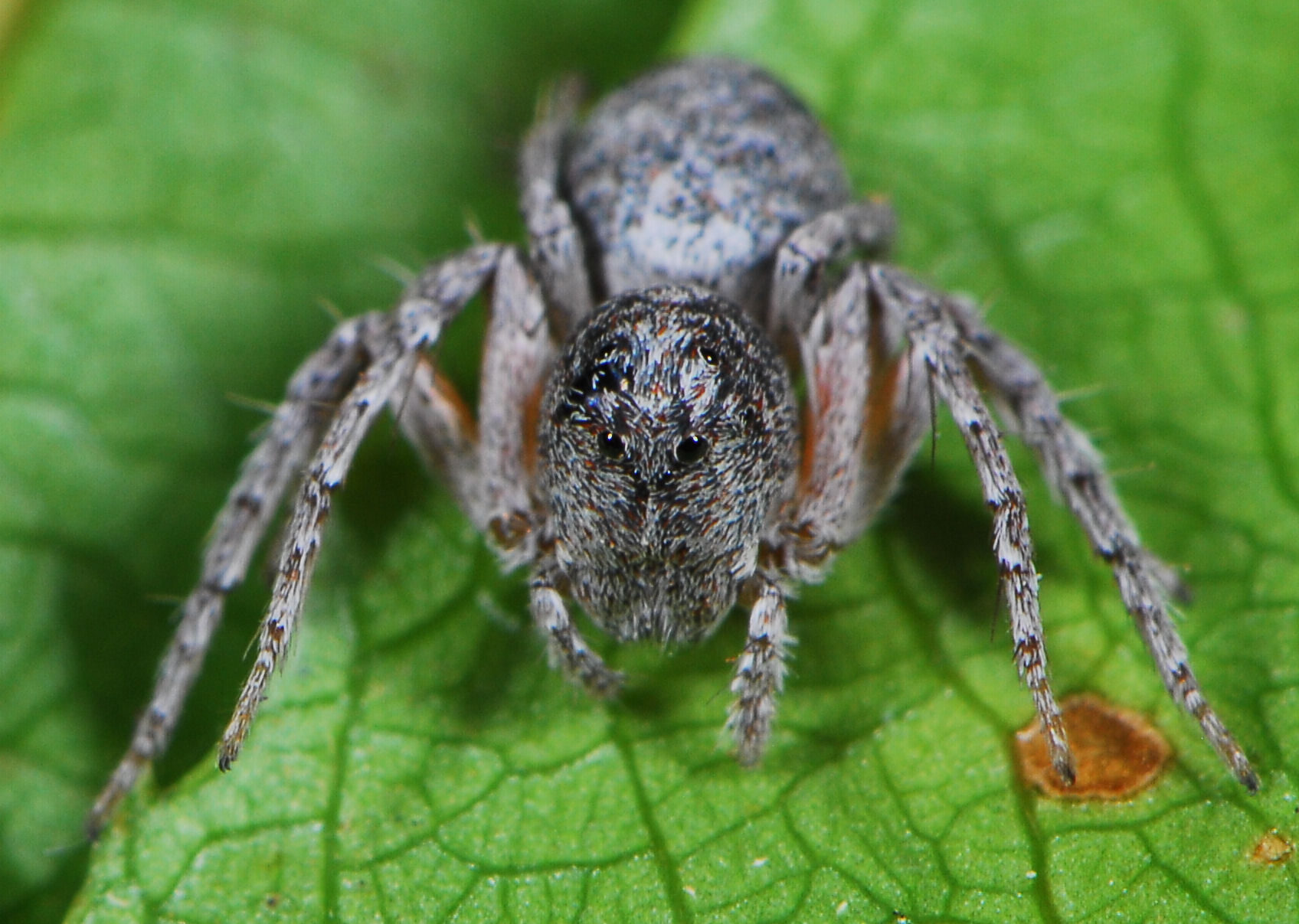
- female
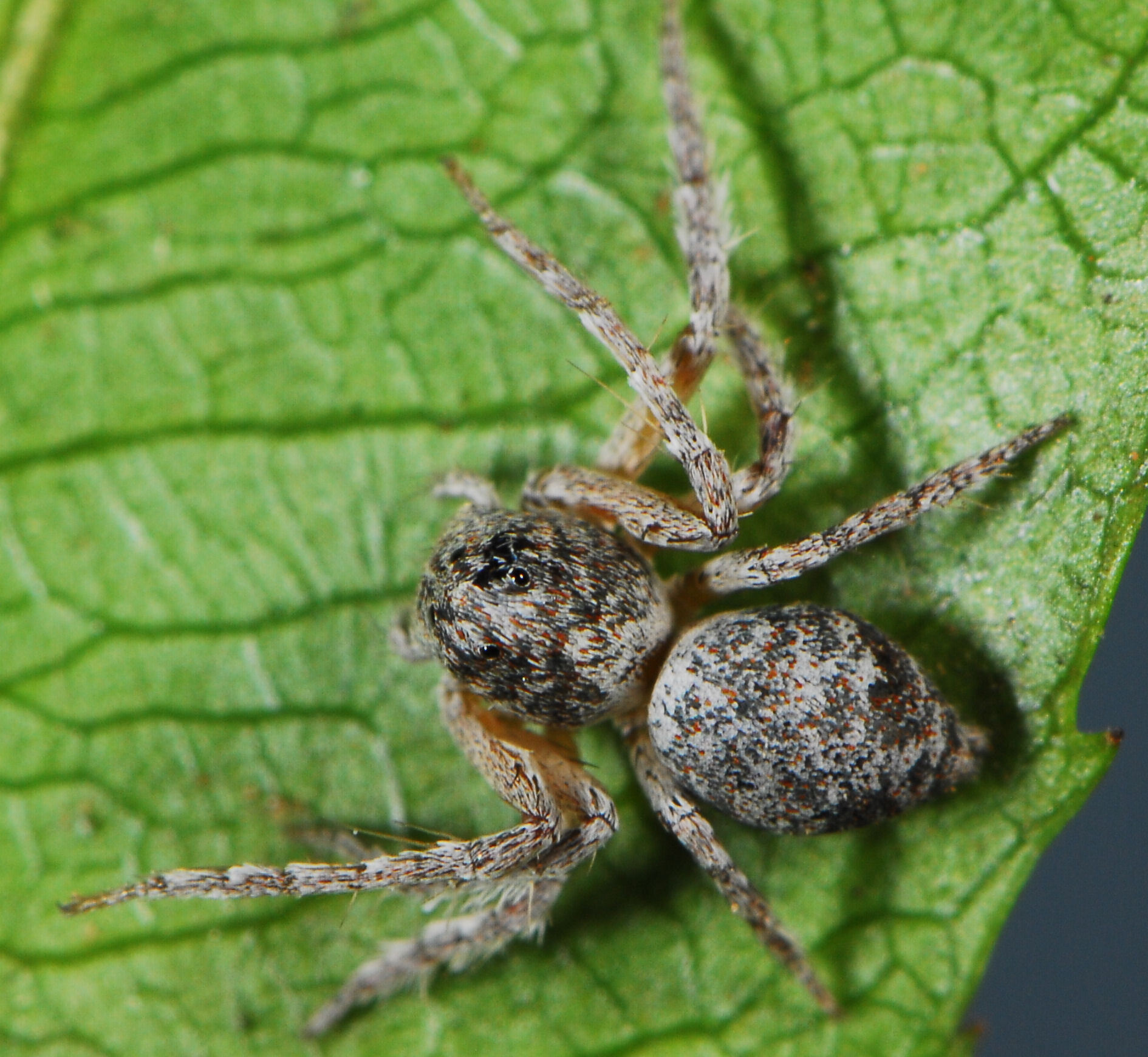
- female

Scientific classification
- Kingdom: Animalia
- Phylum: Arthropoda
- Subphylum: Chelicerata
- Class: Arachnida
- Order: Araneae
- Infraorder: Araneomorphae
- Family: Oxyopidae
- Genus: Hamataliwa
- Species: H. strandi

Binomial name
- Hamataliwa strandi (Lessert, 1923)

Synonyms
- Oxyopeidon strandi Lessert, 1923

= Hamataliwa strandi =

Transvaal Crowned Lynx Spider

Species of spider

Hamataliwa strandi is a species of spider in the family Oxyopidae. It is commonly known as the Transvaal crowned lynx spider and is endemic to southern Africa.

== Distribution ==
Hamataliwa strandi occurs in Mozambique and South Africa. In South Africa, it is recorded from two provinces: Eastern Cape and Limpopo.

The species has a wide geographical range, occurring at altitudes from 16 to 1,341 m above sea level.

== Habitat and ecology ==
Hamataliwa strandi is a free-living plant dweller found in the Savanna and Thicket biomes.

== Description ==
The species is presently known only from females. Like other members of the genus Hamataliwa, it resembles Oxyopes species in color and size but can be distinguished by specific morphological features including eye arrangement and facial structure.

== Etymology ==
The species is named after Embrik Strand.

== Taxonomy ==
The species was originally described as Oxyopeidon strandi by Lessert in 1923, with the type locality given as "Transvaal".

== Conservation ==
Hamataliwa strandi is listed as Least Concern by the South African National Biodiversity Institute due to its wide geographical range. The species is protected in several areas including Polokwane Nature Reserve, Lhuvhondo Nature Reserve, Lekgalameetse Nature Reserve, and Blouberg Nature Reserve.
