= Hamataliwa rufocaligata =

Camel Crowned Lynx Spider

Conservation status
- Least Concern (SANBI Red List)

Scientific classification
- Kingdom: Animalia
- Phylum: Arthropoda
- Subphylum: Chelicerata
- Class: Arachnida
- Order: Araneae
- Infraorder: Araneomorphae
- Family: Oxyopidae
- Genus: Hamataliwa
- Species: H. rufocaligata

Binomial name
- Hamataliwa rufocaligata Simon, 1898

Synonyms
- Hamataliva rufocaligata Simon, 1898; Oxyopedon rufocaligatum Simon, 1904

Species of spider

Hamataliwa rufocaligata is a species of spider in the family Oxyopidae. It is commonly known as the camel crowned lynx spider and is endemic to Africa.

== Etymology ==
The species was originally described by Simon in 1898 from specimens collected in Djibouti.

== Distribution ==
Hamataliwa rufocaligata occurs in Ethiopia, Djibouti, Somalia, Botswana, and South Africa. In South Africa, it is recorded only from the Limpopo province.

The species has a wide geographical range, occurring at altitudes from 409 to 1,535 m above sea level.

== Habitat and ecology ==
Hamataliwa rufocaligata is a free-living plant dweller found in the Savanna biome.

== Description ==
The species is presently known only from females and has been illustrated in taxonomic literature. Notable features include variable size of the abdominal tubercle.

== Conservation ==
Hamataliwa rufocaligata is listed as Least Concern by the South African National Biodiversity Institute due to its wide geographical range. In South Africa, the species is protected in two areas, Marakele National Park and Blouberg Nature Reserve.
