= Brachythemis impartita =

- male, Egypt

Conservation status
- Least Concern (IUCN 3.1)

Scientific classification
- Kingdom: Animalia
- Phylum: Arthropoda
- Clade: Pancrustacea
- Class: Insecta
- Order: Odonata
- Suborder: Anisoptera
- Superfamily: Libelluloidea
- Family: Libellulidae
- Genus: Brachythemis
- Species: B. impartita

Binomial name
- Brachythemis impartita (Karsch, 1890)

Synonyms
- Zonothrasys impartitus Karsch, 1890

Species of dragonfly

Brachythemis impartita, the Northern banded groundling, is a species of dragonfly, a skimmer from the family Libellulidae from central and northern Africa, its range extending into southern Europe and the Middle East. It was previously considered to be conspecific with B. leucosticta.

== Description ==
Brachythemis impartita has a pale cream pterostigma in both sexes and their eyes appear to be striped. The female has a buffy abdomen and thorax, males are darker and mature males can be dark blue to black on the abdomen and thorax. Males have bands on the outer wings from the node to just short of the pterostigma, this is paler in teneral individuals but darkens as the dragonfly matures. Where they overlap with B. leucosticta the males can be distinguished by the colour of the veins and the genital lobe, as well as by the ventral structure of segment 8. The females cannot yet be told apart. The length of this dragonfly is from 25 to 34 millimetres (0.98 to 1.34 in) and the span of the hindwings is 20 to 26 millimetres (0.79 to 1.02 in).

== Distribution ==
Brachythemis impartita is found from central Africa as far south as the Democratic Republic of the Congo and Tanzania north through Africa and to the Mediterranean Sea. Its range also extends into the Middle East where it has been recorded from the Arabian Peninsula, the Levant, Cyprus and southern Anatolia. It has colonised southern Europe and was first recorded there in Portugal in 1957 but it is now also found in Spain, Sardinia, Corsica, Sicily and by 2015 in mainland Italy.

== Habitat and biology ==
Brachythemis impartita is generally a lower level species of slow moving rivers, lakes and still waters in rather open landscapes. It prefers waters with softer substrates such as sand and, possibly mud. Both this species and B. leucosticta are well known in Africa for their habit of following and flying around larger animals, including people, to catch insects disturbed by their passage. Where they occur these dragonflies can be the most common species of Odonata.

== Taxonomy ==
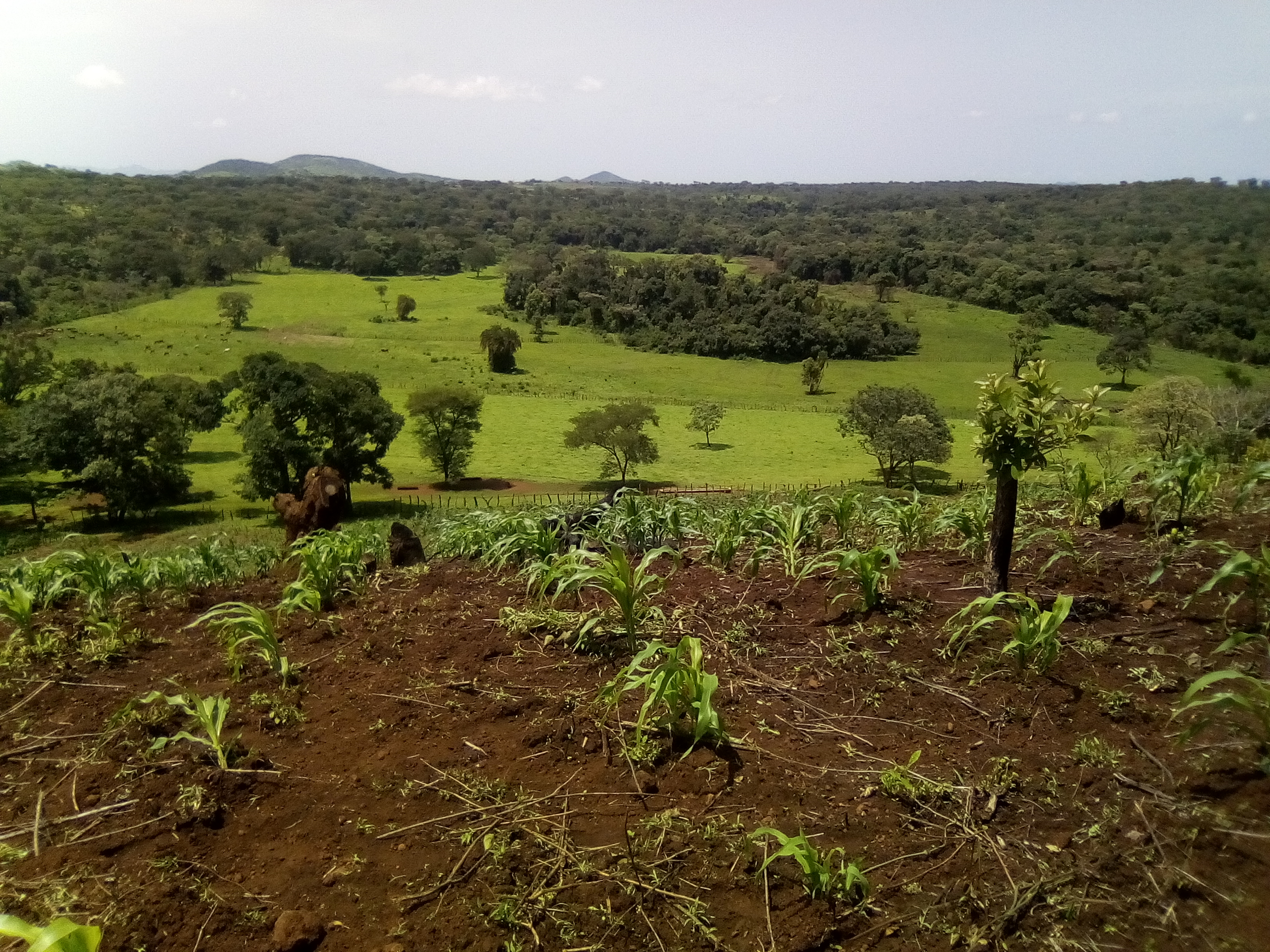
Ngaoundaba Landscape

Brachythemis impartita was formerly considered a synonym of B. leucosticta but workers noted that the adult males came in two morphs and that the ranges of the morphs overlapped in central Africa. Although the females could not be told apart the differences in the males were consistent, especially the colour of the genitalia and the permanent bands on the outer wings. The name Brachythemis impartita was given to specimens collected in at Ngaoundaba Ranch in Cameroon and described as Zonothrasys impartitus by Ferdinand Karsch in 1890. Cameroon lies within the range of B. impartita and so these were designated as neotypes. It may be that where the two species overlap, B. leucosticta breeds on muddy substrates while B. impartita prefers sandier areas.
