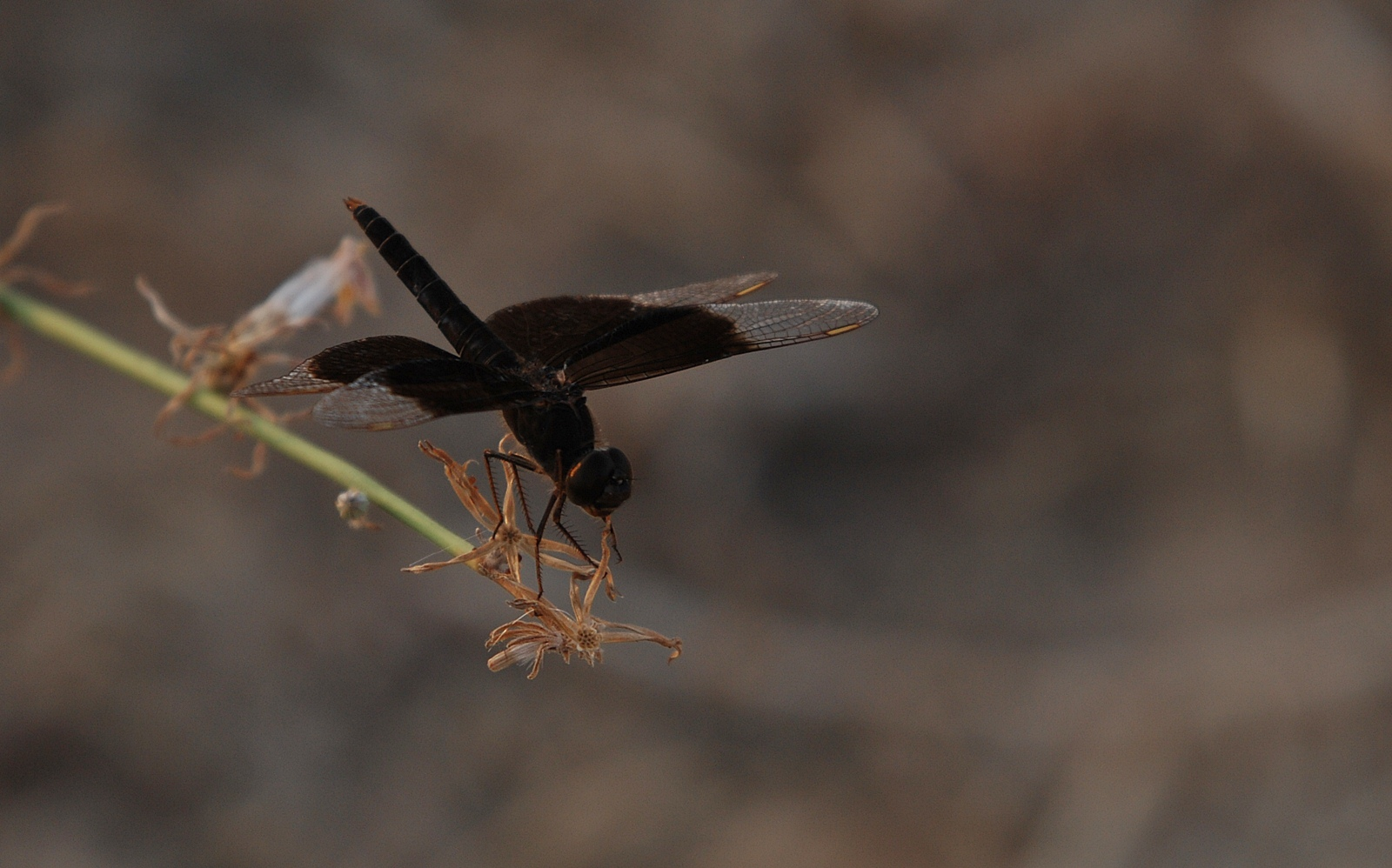

Conservation status
- Vulnerable (IUCN 3.1)

Scientific classification
- Kingdom: Animalia
- Phylum: Arthropoda
- Class: Insecta
- Order: Odonata
- Infraorder: Anisoptera
- Family: Libellulidae
- Genus: Brachythemis
- Species: B. fuscopalliata

Binomial name
- Brachythemis fuscopalliata (Selys, 1887)

= Brachythemis fuscopalliata =

Species of dragonfly

Brachythemis fuscopalliata, the dark-winged groundling, is a species of dragonfly in the family Libellulidae. It is found in Iran, Iraq, Israel, Syria, and Turkey. Its natural habitats are rivers, swamps, freshwater lakes, freshwater marshes, water storage areas, ponds, open excavations, irrigated land, and canals and ditches. It is threatened by habitat loss.
