= Brachythemis wilsoni =

Conservation status
- Least Concern (IUCN 3.1)

Scientific classification
- Kingdom: Animalia
- Phylum: Arthropoda
- Class: Insecta
- Order: Odonata
- Infraorder: Anisoptera
- Family: Libellulidae
- Genus: Brachythemis
- Species: B. wilsoni

Binomial name
- Brachythemis wilsoni Pinhey, 1952

Species of dragonfly

Brachythemis wilsoni is a species of dragonfly in the family Libellulidae. It is found in Burkina Faso, Cameroon, the Democratic Republic of the Congo, Ivory Coast, Nigeria, Sudan, Togo, Uganda, possibly Botswana, and possibly Kenya. Its natural habitats are dry savanna, moist savanna, subtropical or tropical dry shrubland, subtropical or tropical moist shrubland, rivers, and intermittent rivers.
