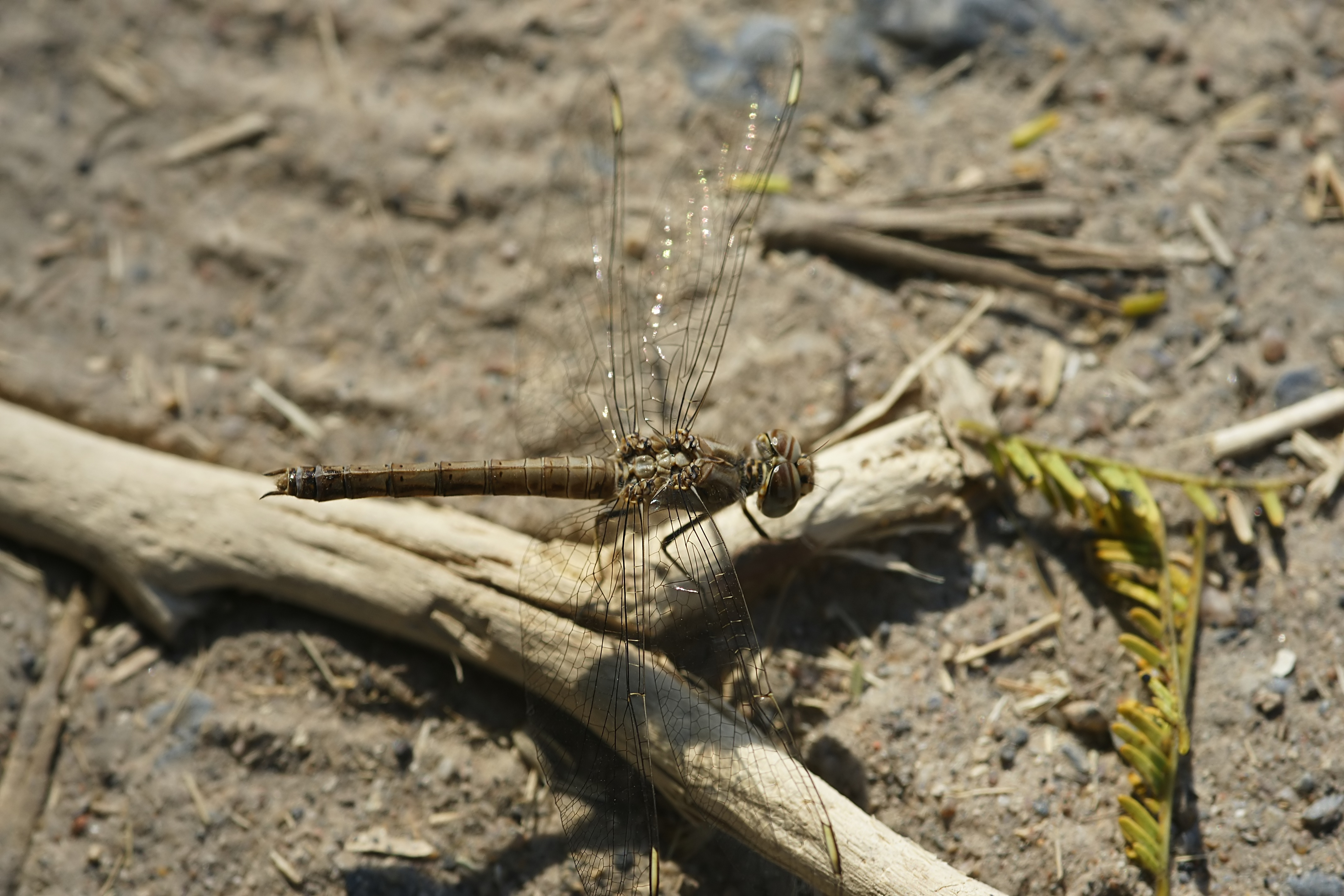

Conservation status
- Least Concern (IUCN 3.1)

Scientific classification
- Kingdom: Animalia
- Phylum: Arthropoda
- Clade: Pancrustacea
- Class: Insecta
- Order: Odonata
- Infraorder: Anisoptera
- Family: Libellulidae
- Genus: Brachythemis
- Species: B. lacustris

Binomial name
- Brachythemis lacustris (Kirby, 1889)

= Brachythemis lacustris =

Species of dragonfly

Brachythemis lacustris, the red groundling, is a species of dragonfly in the family Libellulidae. It is found in Angola, Botswana, Burkina Faso, the Democratic Republic of the Congo, Ivory Coast, Equatorial Guinea, Ethiopia, Gambia, Ghana, Guinea, Kenya, Liberia, Malawi, Mozambique, Namibia, Niger, Nigeria, Senegal, Somalia, South Africa, Sudan, Tanzania, Togo, Uganda, Zambia, Zimbabwe, and possibly Burundi. Its natural habitats are subtropical or tropical dry forests, subtropical or tropical moist lowland forests, dry savanna, moist savanna, subtropical or tropical dry shrubland, subtropical or tropical moist shrubland, rivers, and intermittent rivers.
