= UMkhuze Game Reserve =

Game reserve in Zululand, KwaZulu-Natal, South Africa

uMkhuze Game Reserve
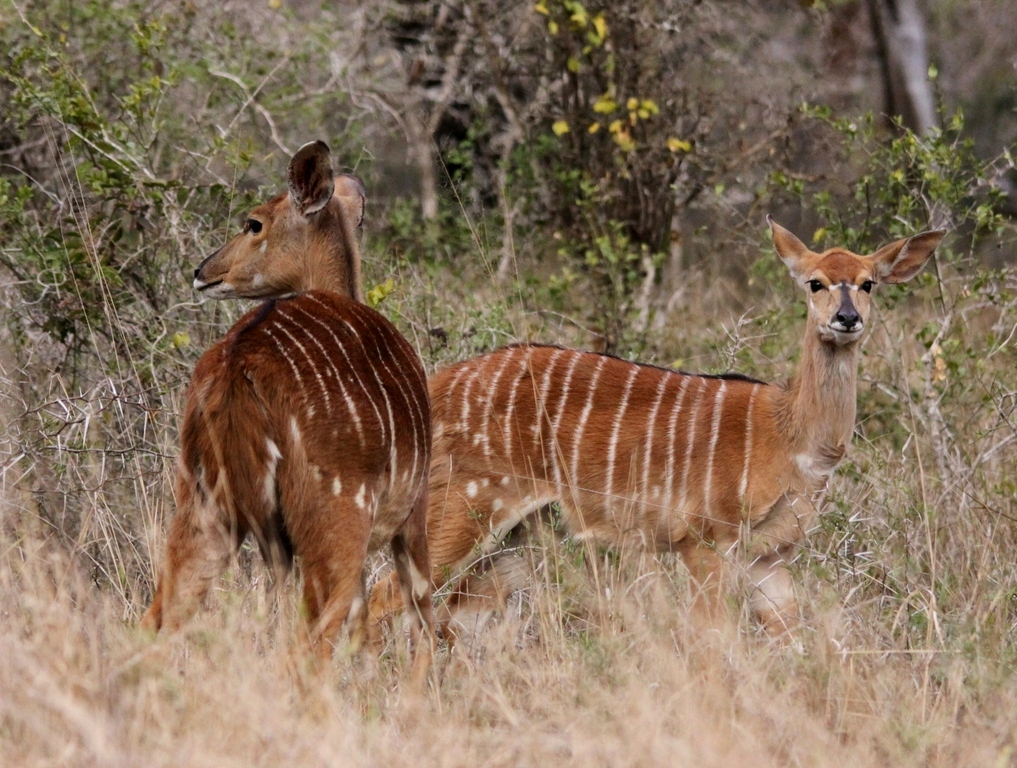
- Nyala ewes in the reserve

- Location within KwaZulu-Natal
- Location: KwaZulu-Natal
- Nearest city: Richards Bay
- Coordinates: 27°39′0″S 32°15′0″E
- Area: 40,000 ha (400 km^{2}) 400 km^{2} (150 sq mi)
- Established: 1912
- Governing body: Ezemvelo KZN Wildlife

uMkhuze Game Reserve (also spelt Mkhuze or Mkuze) is a 400-square-kilometre (150 sq mi) game reserve in northern Zululand, KwaZulu-Natal, South Africa. It was proclaimed a protected area on 15 February 1912.

== Wildlife ==
- African bush elephant
- Blue wildebeest
- African buffalo
- Cape wild dog
- Hyena
- Hippopotamus
- South African giraffe
- Greater kudu
- South African cheetah
- African leopard
- Lion
- Nile crocodile
- Steenbok
- South-central black rhinoceros and Southern white rhinoceros
- Burchell's zebra

The reserve has a diversity of natural habitats which include acacia savannah, mixed woodland, sand forest, riverine forest, rivers and pans, grassland, cliffs and rocky ridges.

== See also ==
- Protected areas of South Africa
- Greater St Lucia Wetland Park
- Phinda Resource Reserve
