= Zelotes doddieburni =

Zimbabwe Dark Ground Spider

Conservation status
- Least Concern (SANBI Red List)

Scientific classification
- Kingdom: Animalia
- Phylum: Arthropoda
- Subphylum: Chelicerata
- Class: Arachnida
- Order: Araneae
- Infraorder: Araneomorphae
- Family: Gnaphosidae
- Genus: Zelotes
- Species: Z. doddieburni

Binomial name
- Zelotes doddieburni FitzPatrick, 2007

Species of spider

Zelotes doddieburni is a species of spider in the family Gnaphosidae. It is commonly known as Zimbabwe dark ground spider.

== Distribution ==
Zelotes doddieburni is a southern African endemic distributed across Zimbabwe and South Africa. In South Africa, it is recorded from only one locality in Limpopo at 1,052 m above sea level.

The species is known from Wylie's Poort in Limpopo.

== Habitat and ecology ==
The species inhabits the Savanna biome. These are free-running ground spiders that are found under stones during the day.

== Conservation ==
Zelotes doddieburni is listed as Least Concern by the South African National Biodiversity Institute due to its wide geographic range in southern Africa. There are no significant threats to the species. The species is possibly undersampled in South Africa.

== Taxonomy ==
The species was described by FitzPatrick in 2007 from Zimbabwe. It is known from both sexes.
