= Zelotes captator =

Scientific classification
- Kingdom: Animalia
- Phylum: Arthropoda
- Subphylum: Chelicerata
- Class: Arachnida
- Order: Araneae
- Infraorder: Araneomorphae
- Family: Gnaphosidae
- Genus: Zelotes
- Species: Z. captator

Binomial name
- Zelotes captator (Thorell, 1887)

Species of spiders

Zelotes captator is a species of Southeast Asian ground spider. It was first described by Tamerlan Thorell in 1887, and has only been found in Myanmar. In 2022, it was moved from the monotypic genus Aracus to the genus Zelotes.
