= Kituba =

Kituba may refer to:

- Kituba (spider), a genus of spiders in the family Gnaphosidae
- Kituba language, a creole language spoken in the Democratic Republic of the Congo and the Republic of the Congo

== See also ==
- Ketubah, Jewish marriage contract
