= Yoruba =

Yoruba may refer to:

- Yoruba people, an ethnic group of West Africa
- Yoruba language, a West African language of the Volta–Niger language family
- Yoruba alphabet, a Latin alphabet used to write in the Yoruba language
- Yoruba religion, West African religion
- Yorubaland, the region occupied by the Yoruba people
- Yoruba (spider), a genus of ground spiders
