= Pseudodrassus =

Scientific classification
- Domain: Eukaryota
- Kingdom: Animalia
- Phylum: Arthropoda
- Subphylum: Chelicerata
- Class: Arachnida
- Order: Araneae
- Infraorder: Araneomorphae
- Family: Gnaphosidae
- Genus: Pseudodrassus; Caporiacco, 1935

Type species
- P. ricasolii Caporiacco, 1935

Species
- 4, see text

Genus of spiders

Pseudodrassus is a genus of ground spiders that was first described by Lodovico di Caporiacco in 1935.

== Species ==
As of May 2019 it contains four species:

- Pseudodrassus pichoni Schenkel, 1963 – China
- Pseudodrassus quadridentatus (Caporiacco, 1928) – Libya
- Pseudodrassus ricasolii Caporiacco, 1935 (type) – Turkey
- Pseudodrassus scorteccii Caporiacco, 1936 – Libya
