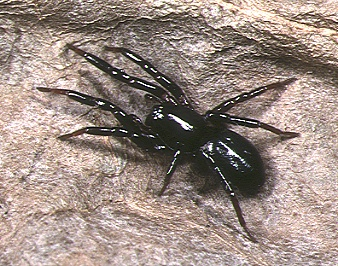
- C. auster, female

Scientific classification
- Domain: Eukaryota
- Kingdom: Animalia
- Phylum: Arthropoda
- Subphylum: Chelicerata
- Class: Arachnida
- Order: Araneae
- Infraorder: Araneomorphae
- Family: Gnaphosidae
- Genus: Cladothela; Kishida, 1928

Type species
- C. boninensis Kishida, 1928

Species
- 11, see text

= Cladothela =

Genus of spiders

Cladothela is a genus of Asian ground spiders that was first described by Kyukichi Kishida in 1928.

== Species ==
As of May 2019 it contains eleven species:

- Cladothela auster Kamura, 1997 – Japan
- Cladothela bistorta Zhang, Song & Zhu, 2002 – China
- Cladothela boninensis Kishida, 1928 (type) – Japan
- Cladothela hupingensis Yin, 2012 – China
- Cladothela joannisi (Schenkel, 1963) – China
- Cladothela ningmingensis Zhang, Yin & Bao, 2004 – China
- Cladothela oculinotata (Bösenberg & Strand, 1906) – China, Korea, Japan
- Cladothela parva Kamura, 1991 – China, Korea, Japan
- Cladothela tortiembola Paik, 1992 – Korea
- Cladothela unciinsignita (Bösenberg & Strand, 1906) – Korea, Japan
- Cladothela unmunensis Seo, 2017 – Korea
