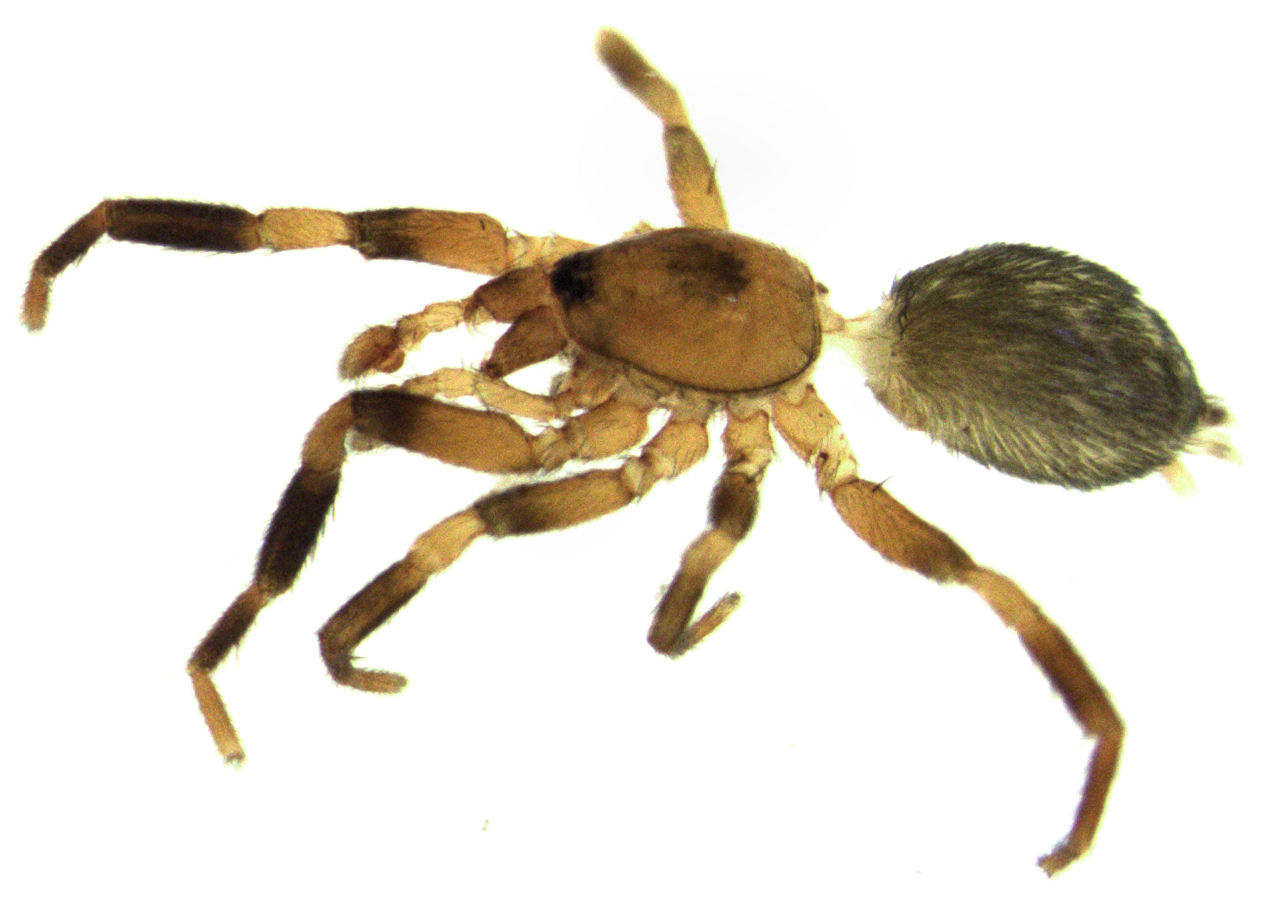
- N. tapa, male

Scientific classification
- Kingdom: Animalia
- Phylum: Arthropoda
- Subphylum: Chelicerata
- Class: Arachnida
- Order: Araneae
- Infraorder: Araneomorphae
- Family: Gnaphosidae
- Genus: Nauhea; Forster, 1979
- Species: N. tapa

Binomial name
- Nauhea tapa Forster, 1979

= Nauhea tapa =

Genus of spiders

Nauhea is a monotypic genus of South Pacific ground spiders containing the single species, Nauhea tapa. It was first described by Raymond Robert Forster in 1979, and has only been found in New Zealand.
