= Iranotricha =

Scientific classification
- Kingdom: Animalia
- Phylum: Arthropoda
- Subphylum: Chelicerata
- Class: Arachnida
- Order: Araneae
- Infraorder: Araneomorphae
- Family: Gnaphosidae
- Genus: Iranotricha; Zamani & Marusik, 2018
- Species: I. lutensis

Binomial name
- Iranotricha lutensis Zamani & Marusik, 2018

Genus of spiders

Iranotricha is a genus of ground spiders containing the single species, Iranotricha lutensis. It was first described by Alireza Zamani & Yuri M. Marusik in 2018, and is only found in the Lut Desert, Iran.
