= Coreodrassus =

Scientific classification
- Kingdom: Animalia
- Phylum: Arthropoda
- Subphylum: Chelicerata
- Class: Arachnida
- Order: Araneae
- Infraorder: Araneomorphae
- Family: Gnaphosidae
- Genus: Coreodrassus; Paik, 1984

Type species
- C. lancearius (Simon, 1893)

Species
- C. forficalus Zhang & Zhu, 2008 – China; C. lancearius (Simon, 1893) – Kazakhstan, China, Korea, Japan; C. semidesertus Ponomarev & Tsvetkov, 2006 – Kazakhstan

Genus of spiders

Coreodrassus is a genus of Asian ground spiders that was first described by K. Y. Paik in 1984. As of May 2019 it contains only three species: C. forficalus, C. lancearius, and C. semidesertus.
