= Homoeothele =

Scientific classification
- Kingdom: Animalia
- Phylum: Arthropoda
- Subphylum: Chelicerata
- Class: Arachnida
- Order: Araneae
- Infraorder: Araneomorphae
- Family: Gnaphosidae
- Genus: Homoeothele; Simon, 1908
- Species: H. micans

Binomial name
- Homoeothele micans Simon, 1908

Genus of spiders

Homoeothele is a monotypic genus of Australian ground spiders containing the single species, Homoeothele micans. It was first described by Eugène Simon in 1908, and has only been found in Australia.
