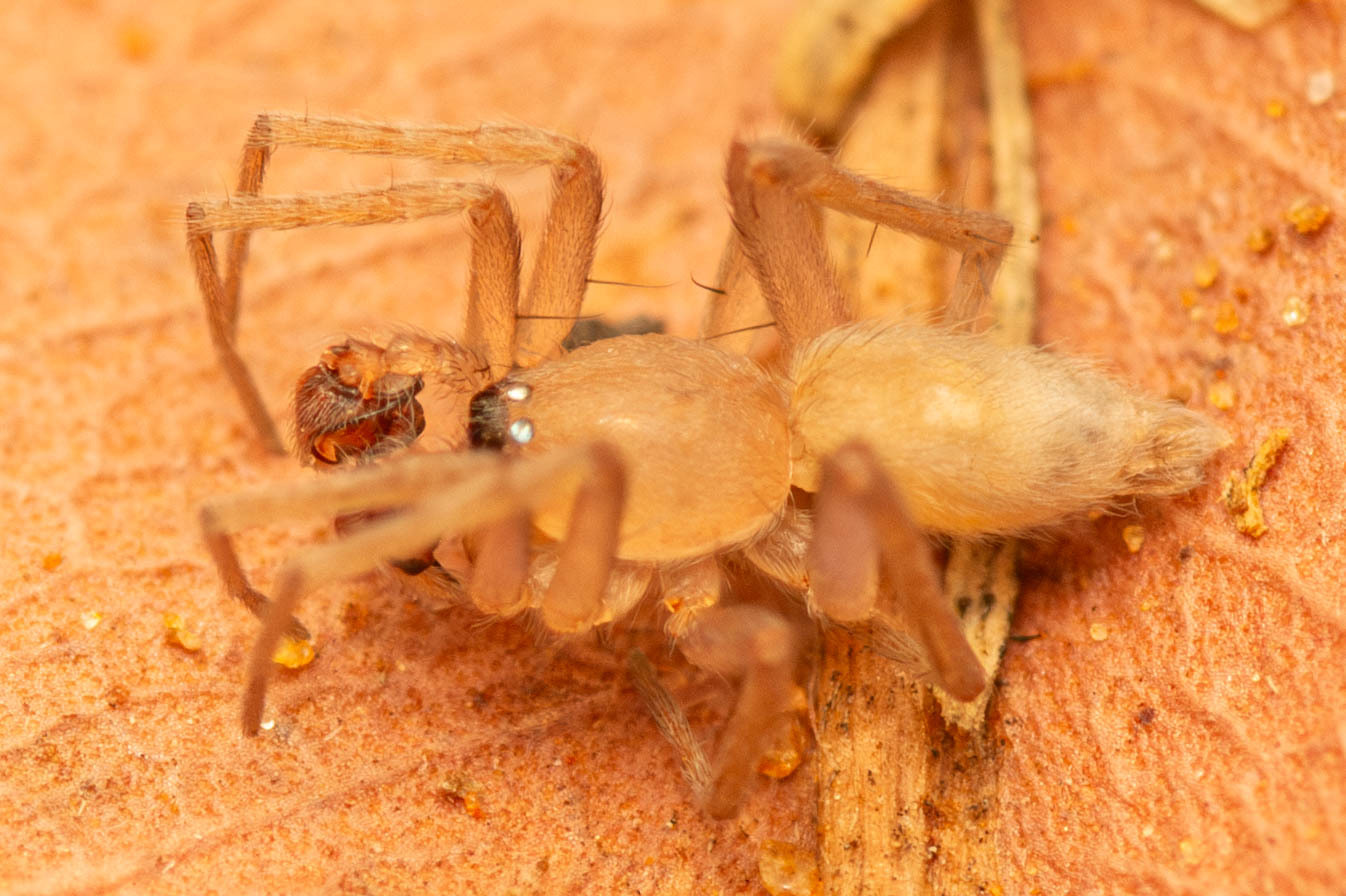
- male A. catharinae

Scientific classification
- Kingdom: Animalia
- Phylum: Arthropoda
- Subphylum: Chelicerata
- Class: Arachnida
- Order: Araneae
- Infraorder: Araneomorphae
- Family: Gnaphosidae
- Subfamily: Leptodrassinae
- Genus: Afrodrassex; Haddad & Booysen, 2022

Type species
- A. balrog Haddad & Booysen, 2022

Species
- 2, see text

= Afrodrassex =

Genus of spiders

Afrodrassex is a genus of spiders in the family Gnaphosidae.

== Distribution ==
Afrodrassex is restricted to southern Africa, with its known distribution limited to Angola and South Africa. Both described species are found in South Africa, while A. balrog was additionally sampled from Angola.

== Description ==
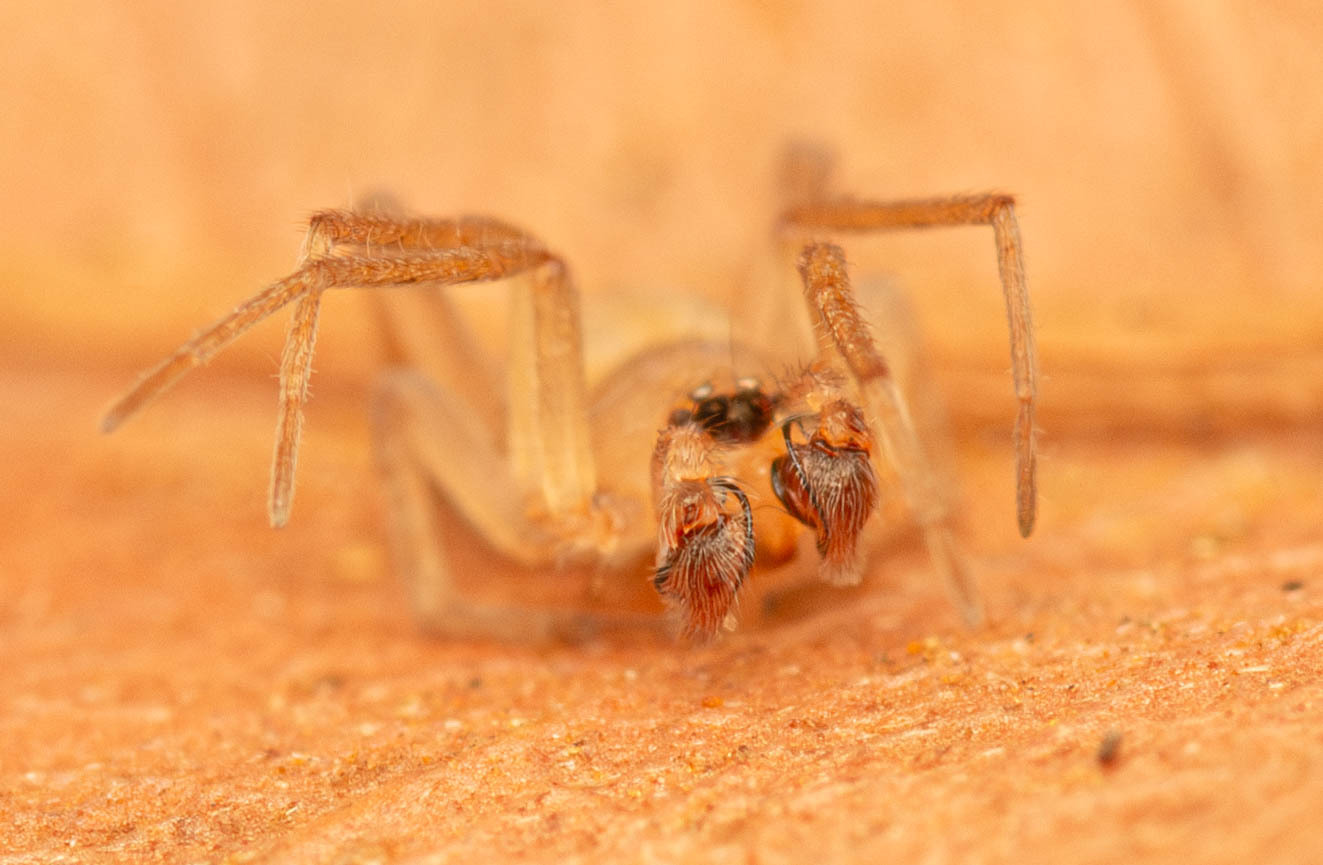
male A. catharinae

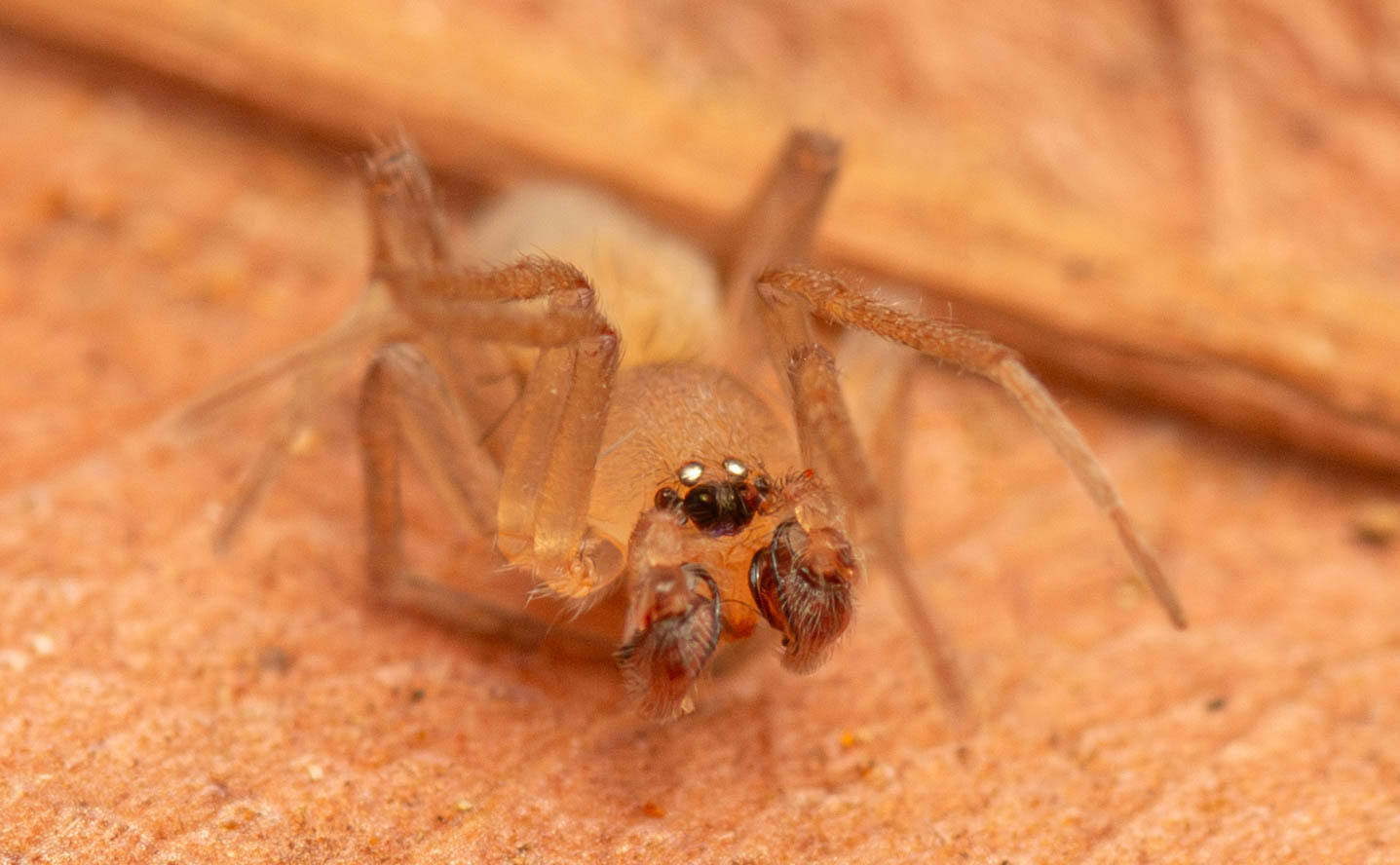
male A. catharinae

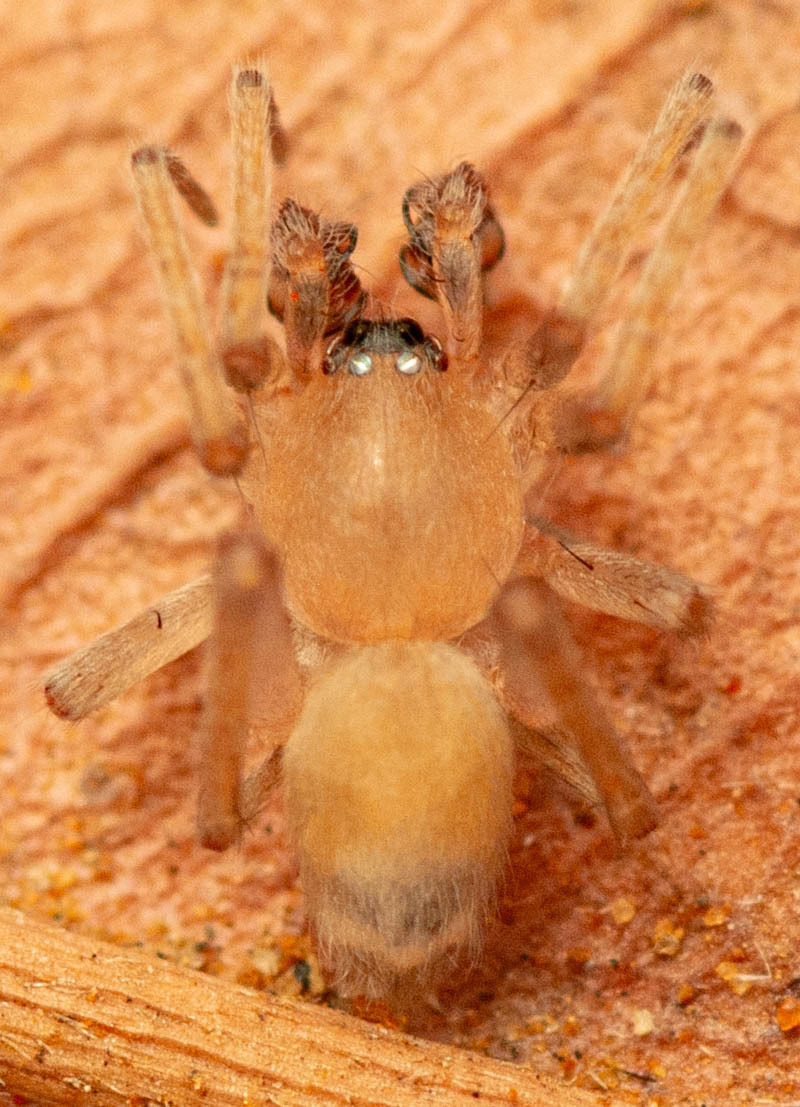
male A. catharinae

Afrodrassex are small pale spiders, around 2.23–3.20 mm in females and 1.85–2.75 mm in males.

== Etymology ==
The genus name is a combination of "Afro-", referring to the distribution in the Afrotropical region, and the latter part of the related genus Leptodrassex.

A. balrog is named after the demon Balrog from Lord of the Rings, who has been depicted as wielding a long whip of fire, resembling the very long embolus of this species.

A. catharinae is named after South African ecologist Catharine Hanekom.

== Species ==
As of October 2025, this genus includes two species:

- Afrodrassex balrog Haddad & Booysen, 2022 – Angola, South Africa (type species)
- Afrodrassex catharinae Haddad & Booysen, 2022 – South Africa
