= Laronius =

Scientific classification
- Kingdom: Animalia
- Phylum: Arthropoda
- Subphylum: Chelicerata
- Class: Arachnida
- Order: Araneae
- Infraorder: Araneomorphae
- Family: Gnaphosidae
- Genus: Laronius; Platnick & Deeleman-Reinhold, 2001
- Species: L. erewan

Binomial name
- Laronius erewan Platnick & Deeleman-Reinhold, 2001

Genus of spiders

Laronius is a monotypic genus of Southeast Asian ground spiders containing the single species, Laronius erewan. It was first described by Christa L. Deeleman-Reinhold in 2001, and has only been found in Thailand and in Sumatra.
