= Algarvezelotes =

Scientific classification
- Kingdom: Animalia
- Phylum: Arthropoda
- Subphylum: Chelicerata
- Class: Arachnida
- Order: Araneae
- Infraorder: Araneomorphae
- Family: Gnaphosidae
- Genus: Algarvezelotes; Wunderlich, 2023
- Species: A. unidentatus

Binomial name
- Algarvezelotes unidentatus Wunderlich, 2023

Species of spider

Algarvezelotes is a monotypic genus of spiders in the family Gnaphosidae containing the single species, Algarvezelotes unidentatus. Only the male is known.

== Distribution ==
Algarvezelotes unidentatus has been recorded only from the Algarve region of Portugal.

== Etymology ==
The genus name is a combination of Algarve (where the spider was found) and the related genus Zelotes.

The name of the species is Latin for "single-toothed", referring to the single tooth of the posterior margin of the fang furrow.

== Taxonomy ==
The genus was placed in tribe Zelotini and family Fonteferreidae (spelled Fonteferridae) by its author.
