= Macarophaeus =

Scientific classification
- Kingdom: Animalia
- Phylum: Arthropoda
- Subphylum: Chelicerata
- Class: Arachnida
- Order: Araneae
- Infraorder: Araneomorphae
- Family: Gnaphosidae
- Genus: Macarophaeus; Wunderlich, 2011

Type species
- M. varius (Simon, 1893)

Species
- M. cultior (Kulczyński, 1899) – Canary Is., Madeira; M. insignis Wunderlich, 2011 – Canary Is.; M. varius (Simon, 1893) – Canary Is.

Genus of spiders

Macarophaeus is a genus of European ground spiders that was first described by J. Wunderlich in 2011. As of May 2019 it contains only three species: M. cultior, M. insignis, and M. varius.
