= Ladissa =

Scientific classification
- Kingdom: Animalia
- Phylum: Arthropoda
- Subphylum: Chelicerata
- Class: Arachnida
- Order: Araneae
- Infraorder: Araneomorphae
- Family: Gnaphosidae
- Genus: Ladissa; Simon, 1907

Type species
- L. inda (Simon, 1897)

Species
- 4, see text

Genus of spiders

Ladissa is a genus of ground spiders that was first described by Eugène Simon in 1907.

== Species ==
As of May 2019 it contains four species in India and Africa:

- Ladissa africana Simon, 1907 – Sierra Leone
- Ladissa inda (Simon, 1897) (type) – India
- Ladissa latecingulata Simon, 1907 – India
- Ladissa semirufa Simon, 1907 – Benin
