= Sidydrassus =

Scientific classification
- Domain: Eukaryota
- Kingdom: Animalia
- Phylum: Arthropoda
- Subphylum: Chelicerata
- Class: Arachnida
- Order: Araneae
- Infraorder: Araneomorphae
- Family: Gnaphosidae
- Genus: Sidydrassus; Esyunin & Tuneva, 2002

Type species
- S. shumakovi (Spassky, 1934)

Species
- S. rogue Tuneva, 2004 – Kazakhstan; S. shumakovi (Spassky, 1934) – Russia (Europe), Azerbaijan, Iran, Kazakhstan; S. tianschanicus (Hu & Wu, 1989) – China

Genus of spiders

Sidydrassus is a genus of ground spiders that was first described by S. L. Esyunin & T. K. Tuneva in 2002. As of May 2019 it contains only three species: S. rogue, S. shumakovi, and S. tianschanicus.
