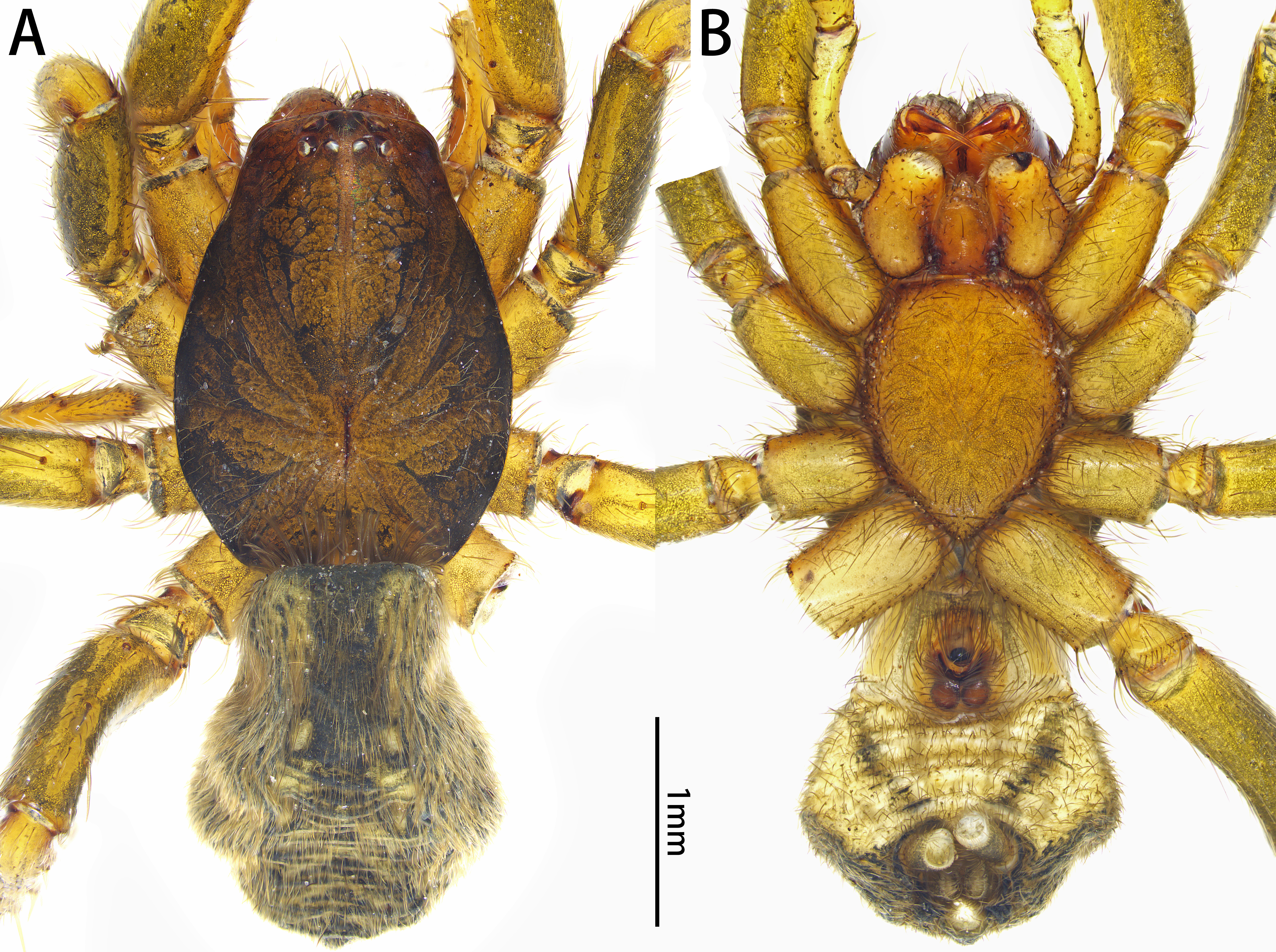
- Found in China

Scientific classification
- Kingdom: Animalia
- Phylum: Arthropoda
- Subphylum: Chelicerata
- Class: Arachnida
- Order: Araneae
- Infraorder: Araneomorphae
- Family: Gnaphosidae
- Genus: Xizangiana; Sherwood, Li & Zhang, 2022

Type species
- X. linzhiensis (Hu, 2001)

Species
- X. linzhiensis (Hu, 2001) – China; X. rigaze (Song, Zhu & Zhang, 2004) – China

Synonyms
- Xizangia Song, Zhu & Zhang, 2004 (illegitimate homonym)

= Xizangiana =

Genus of spiders

Xizangiana is a genus of East Asian ground spiders (family Gnaphosidae). The genus was first described in 2004 under the name Xizangia, but this had already been used for at least two other groups of animals. The replacement name Xizangiana was published by Sherwood, Li & Zhang in 2022. As of June 2022, the genus contains only two species, both found in China: X. linzhiensis and X. rigaze.
