= Apodrassodes =

Scientific classification
- Domain: Eukaryota
- Kingdom: Animalia
- Phylum: Arthropoda
- Subphylum: Chelicerata
- Class: Arachnida
- Order: Araneae
- Infraorder: Araneomorphae
- Family: Gnaphosidae
- Genus: Apodrassodes; Vellard, 1924

Type species
- A. guatemalensis (F. O. Pickard-Cambridge, 1899)

Species
- 10, see text

Genus of spiders

Apodrassodes is a genus of ground spiders that was first described by J. Vellard in 1924.

== Species ==
As of May 2019 it contains ten species:

- Apodrassodes araucanius (Chamberlin, 1916) – Peru, Bolivia, Argentina, Chile
- Apodrassodes chula Brescovit & Lise, 1993 – Brazil
- Apodrassodes guatemalensis (F. O. Pickard-Cambridge, 1899) (type) – Mexico, Central, South America
- Apodrassodes mercedes Platnick & Shadab, 1983 – Chile
- Apodrassodes mono Müller, 1987 – Brazil
- Apodrassodes pucon Platnick & Shadab, 1983 – Chile
- Apodrassodes quilpuensis (Simon, 1902) – Chile
- Apodrassodes taim Brescovit & Lise, 1993 – Brazil
- Apodrassodes trancas Platnick & Shadab, 1983 – Chile, Argentina
- Apodrassodes yogeshi Gajbe, 1993 – India
