= Benoitodes =

Scientific classification
- Kingdom: Animalia
- Phylum: Arthropoda
- Subphylum: Chelicerata
- Class: Arachnida
- Order: Araneae
- Infraorder: Araneomorphae
- Family: Gnaphosidae
- Genus: Benoitodes; Platnick, 1993

Type species
- B. caheni (Benoit, 1977)

Species
- B. caheni (Benoit, 1977) – St. Helena; B. sanctaehelenae (Strand, 1909) – St. Helena

Genus of spiders

Benoitodes is a genus of ground spiders that was first described by Norman I. Platnick in 1993. As of May 2019 it contains only two species: B. caheni and B. sanctaehelenae.
