= Hitobia =

Scientific classification
- Kingdom: Animalia
- Phylum: Arthropoda
- Subphylum: Chelicerata
- Class: Arachnida
- Order: Araneae
- Infraorder: Araneomorphae
- Family: Gnaphosidae
- Genus: Hitobia; Kamura, 1992

Type species
- H. unifascigera (Bösenberg & Strand, 1906)

Species
- 21, see text

Genus of spiders

Hitobia is a genus of Asian ground spiders that was first described by T. Kamura in 1992.

== Species ==
As of January 2022 it contains twenty-one species:

- Hitobia asiatica (Bösenberg & Strand, 1906) – Japan
- Hitobia cancellata Yin, Peng, Gong & Kim, 1996 – China
- Hitobia chayuensis Song, Zhu & Zhang, 2004 – China
- Hitobia hirtella Wang & Peng, 2014 – China
- Hitobia lamhetaghatensis (Gajbe & Gajbe, 1999) – India
- Hitobia makotoi Kamura, 2011 – China, Japan
- Hitobia meghalayensis (Tikader & Gajbe, 1976) – India
- Hitobia menglong Song, Zhu & Zhang, 2004 – China
- Hitobia monsta Yin, Peng, Gong & Kim, 1996 – China
- Hitobia poonaensis (Tikader & Gajbe, 1976) – India
- Hitobia procula Sankaran & Sebastian, 2018 – India
- Hitobia shaohai Yin & Bao, 2012 – China
- Hitobia shimen Yin & Bao, 2012 – China
- Hitobia singhi (Tikader & Gajbe, 1976) – India
- Hitobia taiwanica Zhang, Zhu & Tso, 2009 – Taiwan
- Hitobia tengchong Wang & Peng, 2014 – China
- Hitobia tenuicincta (Simon, 1909) – Vietnam
- Hitobia unifascigera (Bösenberg & Strand, 1906) (type) – China, Korea, Japan
- Hitobia yaginumai Deeleman-Reinhold, 2001 – Thailand
- Hitobia yasunosukei Kamura, 1992 – China, Okinawa
- Hitobia yunnan Song, Zhu & Zhang, 2004 – China
