= Lasophorus =

Scientific classification
- Domain: Eukaryota
- Kingdom: Animalia
- Phylum: Arthropoda
- Subphylum: Chelicerata
- Class: Arachnida
- Order: Araneae
- Infraorder: Araneomorphae
- Family: Gnaphosidae
- Genus: Lasophorus; Chatzaki, 2018

Species
- L. zakkak Chatzaki, 2018 — Greece; L. zografae Chatzaki, 2018 — Greece

Genus of spiders

Lasophorus is a genus of ground spiders first described by M. Chatzaki in 2018. As of April 2019 it contains only two species.
