= Apodrassus =

Scientific classification
- Kingdom: Animalia
- Phylum: Arthropoda
- Subphylum: Chelicerata
- Class: Arachnida
- Order: Araneae
- Infraorder: Araneomorphae
- Family: Gnaphosidae
- Genus: Apodrassus; Chamberlin, 1916
- Species: A. andinus

Binomial name
- Apodrassus andinus Chamberlin, 1916

Genus of spiders

Apodrassus is a monotypic genus of South American ground spiders containing the single species, Apodrassus andinus. It was first described by R. V. Chamberlin in 1916, and has only been found in Peru.
