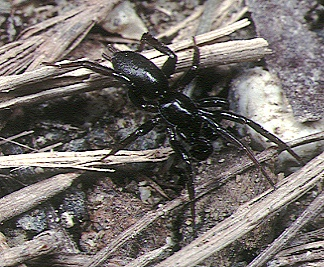
- Male A. flexuosus

Scientific classification
- Kingdom: Animalia
- Phylum: Arthropoda
- Subphylum: Chelicerata
- Class: Arachnida
- Order: Araneae
- Infraorder: Araneomorphae
- Family: Gnaphosidae
- Genus: Aponetius; Kamura, 2020

Type species
- Zelotes gladius (Kamura, 1999)

Species
- 5, see text

= Aponetius =

Genus of spiders

Aponetius is a genus of east Asian ground spiders. It was first described by T. Kamura in 2020, and it has only been found in Japan. The type species, Aponetius gladius, was originally described under the name "Zelotes gladius".

== Species ==
As of December 2021 it contains five species:

- A. flexuosus (Kamura, 1999) – Japan (Ryukyu Is.)
- A. gladius (Kamura, 1999) (type) – Japan (Ryukyu Is.)
- A. ogatai Kamura, 2020 – Japan (Ryukyu Is.)
- A. ryukyuensis (Kamura, 1999) – Japan (Ryukyu Is.)
- A. watarii Kamura, 2020 – Japan (Ryukyu Is.)

== See also ==
- Zelotes
