= Cabanadrassus =

Scientific classification
- Domain: Eukaryota
- Kingdom: Animalia
- Phylum: Arthropoda
- Subphylum: Chelicerata
- Class: Arachnida
- Order: Araneae
- Infraorder: Araneomorphae
- Family: Gnaphosidae
- Genus: Cabanadrassus; Mello-Leitão, 1941
- Species: C. bifasciatus

Binomial name
- Cabanadrassus bifasciatus Mello-Leitão, 1941

Genus of spiders

Cabanadrassus is a monotypic genus of South American ground spiders containing the single species, Cabanadrassus bifasciatus. It was first described by Cândido Firmino de Mello-Leitão in 1941, and has only been found in Argentina.
