= Cryptodrassus =

Scientific classification
- Domain: Eukaryota
- Kingdom: Animalia
- Phylum: Arthropoda
- Subphylum: Chelicerata
- Class: Arachnida
- Order: Araneae
- Infraorder: Araneomorphae
- Family: Gnaphosidae
- Genus: Cryptodrassus; Miller, 1943

Type species
- C. hungaricus (Balogh, 1935)

Species
- 10, see text

Genus of spiders

Cryptodrassus is a genus of ground spiders that was first described by F. Miller in 1943.

== Species ==
As of July 2022 it contains ten species:

- Cryptodrassus beijing Lin & Li, 2022 – China
- Cryptodrassus creticus Chatzaki, 2002 – Greece (Crete), Turkey
- Cryptodrassus helvoloides (Levy, 1998) – Israel
- Cryptodrassus helvolus (O. Pickard-Cambridge, 1872) – Russia (Europe), Turkey, Cyprus, Israel, Iran, Kazakhstan
- Cryptodrassus hungaricus (Balogh, 1935) (type) – France to Greece and Russia (Europe, Caucasus)
- Cryptodrassus iranicus Zamani, Chatzaki, Esyunin & Marusik, 2021 – Iran
- Cryptodrassus khajuriai (Tikader & Gajbe, 1976) – India
- Cryptodrassus mahabalei (Tikader, 1982) – India
- Cryptodrassus platnicki (Gajbe, 1987) – India
- Cryptodrassus ratnagiriensis (Tikader & Gajbe, 1976) – India
