= Ceryerda =

Scientific classification
- Kingdom: Animalia
- Phylum: Arthropoda
- Subphylum: Chelicerata
- Class: Arachnida
- Order: Araneae
- Infraorder: Araneomorphae
- Family: Gnaphosidae
- Genus: Ceryerda; Simon, 1909
- Species: C. cursitans

Binomial name
- Ceryerda cursitans Simon, 1909

Genus of spiders

Ceryerda is a monotypic genus of Australian ground spiders containing the single species, Ceryerda cursitans. It was first described by Eugène Simon in 1909, and has only been found in Australia.
