= Turkozelotes =

Scientific classification
- Domain: Eukaryota
- Kingdom: Animalia
- Phylum: Arthropoda
- Subphylum: Chelicerata
- Class: Arachnida
- Order: Araneae
- Infraorder: Araneomorphae
- Family: Gnaphosidae
- Genus: Turkozelotes; Kovblyuk & Seyyar, 2009

Type species
- T. microb Kovblyuk & Seyyar, 2009

Species
- T. mccowani (Chatzaki & Russell-Smith, 2017) – Greece, Cyprus; T. microb Kovblyuk & Seyyar, 2009 – Greece, Turkey; T. mirandus Ponomarev, 2011 – Russia (Europe), Iran

Genus of spiders

Turkozelotes is a genus of ground spiders that was first described by M. M. Kovblyuk in 2009. As of May 2019 it contains only three species: T. mccowani, T. microb, and T. mirandus.
