= Leptopilos =

Scientific classification
- Kingdom: Animalia
- Phylum: Arthropoda
- Subphylum: Chelicerata
- Class: Arachnida
- Order: Araneae
- Infraorder: Araneomorphae
- Family: Gnaphosidae
- Genus: Leptopilos; Levy, 2009

Type species
- L. tenerrimus (O. Pickard-Cambridge, 1872)

Species
- 10, see text

Genus of spiders

Leptopilos is a genus of ground spiders that was first described by G. Levy in 2009.

== Species ==
As of October 2022 it contains ten species:

- Leptopilos butleri Haddad & Booysen, 2022 – Botswana, Zimbabwe, South Africa
- Leptopilos digitus Haddad & Booysen, 2022 – South Africa
- Leptopilos hadjissaranti (Chatzaki, 2002) – Greece (Crete)
- Leptopilos lakhish Levy, 2009 – Israel
- Leptopilos levantinus Levy, 2009 – Greece, Israel, Iran
- Leptopilos manolisi (Chatzaki, 2002) – Greece (Crete), Israel
- Leptopilos memorialis (Spassky, 1940) – Bulgaria, Greece, Ukraine, Russia (Europe to Central Asia), Kazakhstan, Pakistan, Mongolia
- Leptopilos pupa (Dalmas, 1919) – Egypt
- Leptopilos tenerrimus (O. Pickard-Cambridge, 1872) (type) – Libya, Israel
- Leptopilos vasivulva Haddad & Booysen, 2022 – Botswana, Zimbabwe, South Africa
