= Anagraphis =

Scientific classification
- Kingdom: Animalia
- Phylum: Arthropoda
- Subphylum: Chelicerata
- Class: Arachnida
- Order: Araneae
- Infraorder: Araneomorphae
- Family: Gnaphosidae
- Genus: Anagraphis; Simon, 1893

Type species
- A. pallens Simon, 1893

Species
- 7, see text

Synonyms
- Macedoniella Drensky, 1935

Genus of spiders

Anagraphis is a genus of ground spiders that was first described by Eugène Simon in 1893. Originally placed in the now unrecognized family Prodidomidae, it was moved to the family Gnaphosidae in 2006.

== Species ==
As of May 2019 it contains seven species from Asia and Africa:

- Anagraphis incerta Caporiacco, 1941 – Ethiopia
- Anagraphis maculosa Denis, 1958 – Afghanistan
- Anagraphis minima Caporiacco, 1947 – East Africa
- Anagraphis ochracea (L. Koch, 1867) – Albania, Macedonia, Greece, Turkey
- Anagraphis pallens Simon, 1893 (type) – Libya, Malta, Greece, Turkey, Israel, Syria, Russia (Europe), Azerbaijan, Iran, Kazakhstan, Central Asia
- Anagraphis pluridentata Simon, 1897 – Syria
- Anagraphis pori Levy, 1999 – Israel
