= Zelominor =

Scientific classification
- Kingdom: Animalia
- Phylum: Arthropoda
- Subphylum: Chelicerata
- Class: Arachnida
- Order: Araneae
- Infraorder: Araneomorphae
- Family: Gnaphosidae
- Genus: Zelominor; Snazell & Murphy, 1997

Type species
- Z. malagensis Snazell & Murphy, 1997

Species
- Z. algarvensis Snazell & Murphy, 1997 – Portugal, Spain; Z. algericus Snazell & Murphy, 1997 – Algeria; Z. malagensis Snazell & Murphy, 1997 – Spain

Genus of spiders

Zelominor is a genus of ground spiders first described by R. Snazell & J. Murphy in 1997. As of May 2019 it contains only three species: Z. algarvensis, Z. algericus, and Z. malagensis.
