= Scotocesonia =

Scientific classification
- Domain: Eukaryota
- Kingdom: Animalia
- Phylum: Arthropoda
- Subphylum: Chelicerata
- Class: Arachnida
- Order: Araneae
- Infraorder: Araneomorphae
- Family: Gnaphosidae
- Genus: Scotocesonia; Caporiacco, 1947
- Species: S. demerarae

Binomial name
- Scotocesonia demerarae Caporiacco, 1947

Genus of spiders

Scotocesonia is a monotypic genus of South American ground spiders containing the single species, Scotocesonia demerarae. It was first described by Lodovico di Caporiacco in 1947, and has only been found in Guyana.
