= Verita =

Scientific classification
- Kingdom: Animalia
- Phylum: Arthropoda
- Subphylum: Chelicerata
- Class: Arachnida
- Order: Araneae
- Infraorder: Araneomorphae
- Family: Gnaphosidae
- Genus: Verita
- Species: V. williamsi

Binomial name
- Verita williamsi Ramírez & Grismado, 2016

Genus of spiders

Verita is a genus of spiders in the family Gnaphosidae. It was first described in 2016 by Ramírez & Grismado. As of 2017, it contains only one species, Verita williamsi, from Argentina.
