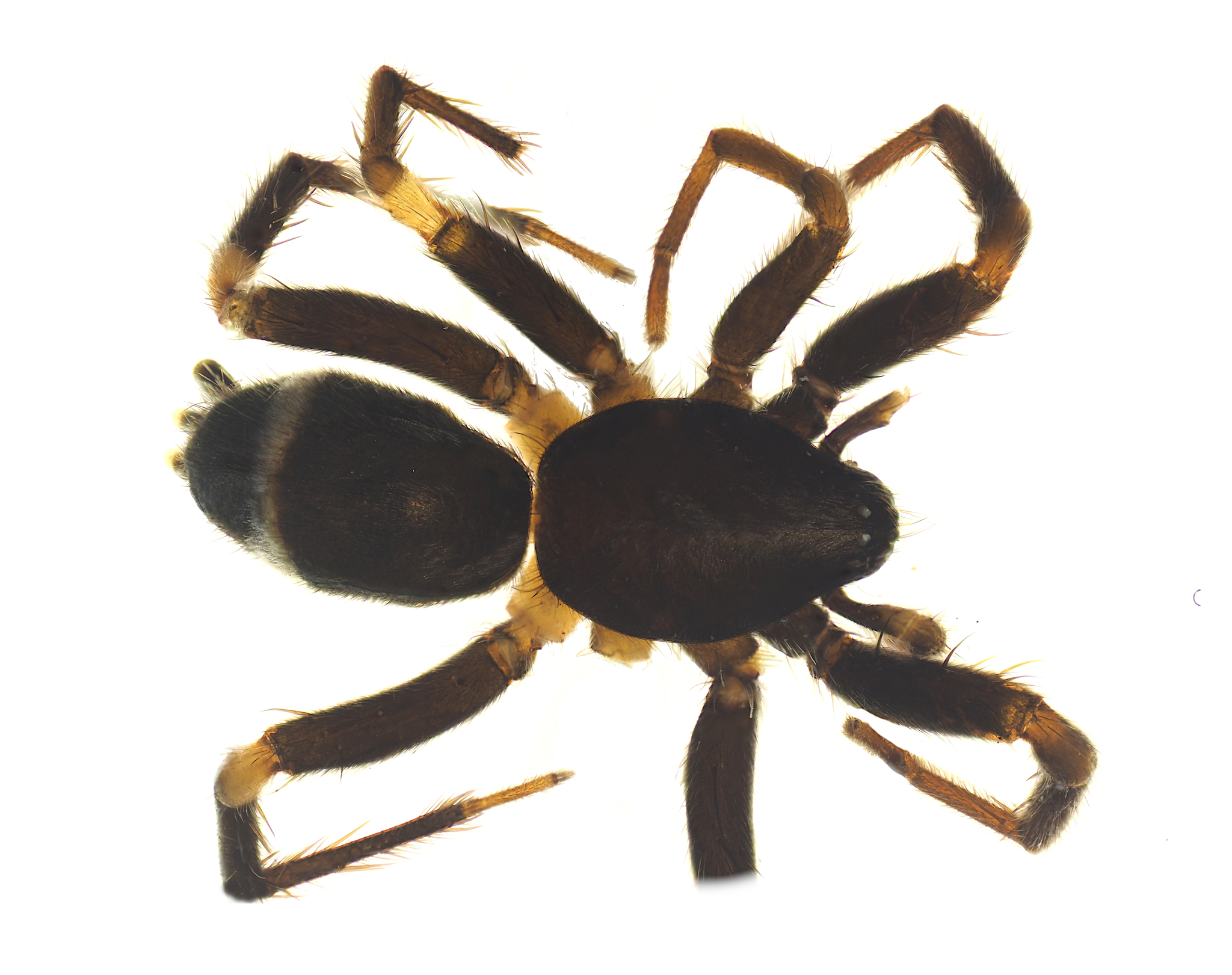

Scientific classification
- Domain: Eukaryota
- Kingdom: Animalia
- Phylum: Arthropoda
- Subphylum: Chelicerata
- Class: Arachnida
- Order: Araneae
- Infraorder: Araneomorphae
- Family: Gnaphosidae
- Genus: Epicharitus; Rainbow, 1916
- Species: E. leucosemus

Binomial name
- Epicharitus leucosemus Rainbow, 1916

= Epicharitus =

Epicharitus leucosemus

Genus of spiders

Epicharitus is a monotypic genus of ground spiders containing the single species, Epicharitus leucosemus. It was first described by William Joseph Rainbow in 1916, and has only been found in Australia.
