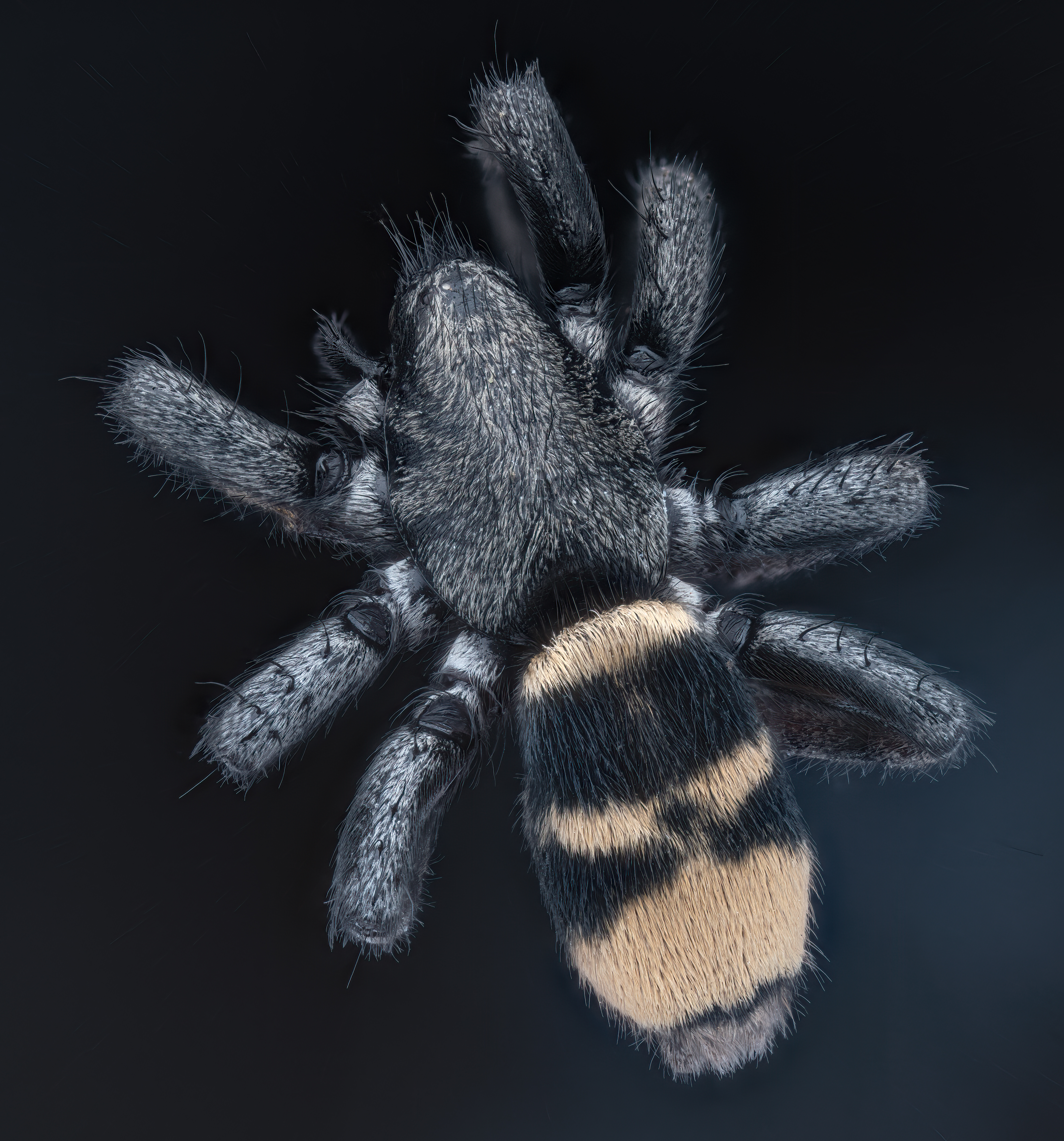
- Latonigena auricomis

Scientific classification
- Kingdom: Animalia
- Phylum: Arthropoda
- Subphylum: Chelicerata
- Class: Arachnida
- Order: Araneae
- Infraorder: Araneomorphae
- Family: Gnaphosidae
- Genus: Latonigena; Simon, 1893

Type species
- L. auricomis Simon, 1893

Species
- 10, see text

= Latonigena =

Genus of spiders

Latonigena is a genus of ground spiders that was first erected by Eugène Simon in 1893. Species of the genus are found in South America.

== Species ==
As of May 2019 it contains ten species:

- Latonigena auricomis Simon, 1893 (type) – Brazil, Uruguay, Argentina
- Latonigena beni Ott, Rodrigues & Brescovit, 2012 – Bolivia, Brazil
- Latonigena colombo Ott, Rodrigues & Brescovit, 2012 – Brazil
- Latonigena lami Ott, Rodrigues & Brescovit, 2012 – Brazil, Argentina
- Latonigena pampa López Carrión & Grismado, 2014 – Argentina
- Latonigena pittieri López Carrión & Grismado, 2014 – Venezuela
- Latonigena santana Ott, Rodrigues & Brescovit, 2012 – Brazil, Argentina
- Latonigena sapiranga Ott, Rodrigues & Brescovit, 2012 – Brazil
- Latonigena taim Ott, Rodrigues & Brescovit, 2012 – Brazil
- Latonigena turvo Ott, Rodrigues & Brescovit, 2012 – Brazil, Argentina
