= Amazoromus =

Scientific classification
- Kingdom: Animalia
- Phylum: Arthropoda
- Subphylum: Chelicerata
- Class: Arachnida
- Order: Araneae
- Infraorder: Araneomorphae
- Family: Gnaphosidae
- Genus: Amazoromus; Brescovit & Höfer, 1994

Type species
- A. kedus Brescovit & Höfer, 1994

Species
- 4, see text

Genus of spiders

Amazoromus is a genus of South American ground spiders that was first described by Antônio Brescovit & H. Höfer in 1994.

== Species ==
As of May 2019 it contains four species, all found in Brazil:

- Amazoromus becki Brescovit & Höfer, 1994 – Brazil
- Amazoromus cristus (Platnick & Höfer, 1990) – Brazil
- Amazoromus janauari Brescovit & Höfer, 1994 – Brazil
- Amazoromus kedus Brescovit & Höfer, 1994 (type) – Brazil
