= Drassodex =

Scientific classification
- Kingdom: Animalia
- Phylum: Arthropoda
- Subphylum: Chelicerata
- Class: Arachnida
- Order: Araneae
- Infraorder: Araneomorphae
- Family: Gnaphosidae
- Genus: Drassodex; Murphy, 2007

Type species
- D. hypocrita (Simon, 1878)

Species
- 10, see text

Genus of spiders

Drassodex is a genus of ground spiders that was first described by J. Murphy in 2007.

== Species ==
As of May 2019 it contains ten species:

- Drassodex cervinus (Simon, 1914) – Spain, France
- Drassodex drescoi Hervé, Roberts & Murphy, 2009 – France, Switzerland, Italy
- Drassodex fritillifer (Simon, 1914) – Spain, France
- Drassodex granja Hervé, Roberts & Murphy, 2009 – Spain
- Drassodex heeri (Pavesi, 1873) – Europe
- Drassodex hispanus (L. Koch, 1866) – Europe
- Drassodex hypocrita (Simon, 1878) (type) – Europe
- Drassodex lesserti (Schenkel, 1936) – France, Switzerland
- Drassodex simoni Hervé, Roberts & Murphy, 2009 – France, Switzerland
- Drassodex validior (Simon, 1914) – France
