= Heser =

Scientific classification
- Domain: Eukaryota
- Kingdom: Animalia
- Phylum: Arthropoda
- Subphylum: Chelicerata
- Class: Arachnida
- Order: Araneae
- Infraorder: Araneomorphae
- Family: Gnaphosidae
- Genus: Heser; Tuneva, 2004

Type species
- H. malefactor Tuneva, 2004

Species
- 11, see text

Genus of spiders

Heser is a genus of ground spiders that was first described by T. K. Tuneva in 2004.

== Species ==
As of May 2019 it contains eleven species, two from North America:

- Heser aradensis (Levy, 1998) – Israel
- Heser bernardi (Marinaro, 1967) – Spain, Algeria
- Heser bonneti (Marinaro, 1967) – Algeria
- Heser hierosolymitanus (Levy, 1998) – Israel
- Heser hispanus Senglet, 2012 – Spain
- Heser infumatus (O. Pickard-Cambridge, 1872) – Tanzania, Egypt, Israel
- Heser malefactor Tuneva, 2004 (type) – Kazakhstan
- Heser nilicola (O. Pickard-Cambridge, 1874) – Mediterranean, Canary Is. Introduced to USA, Mexico
- Heser schmitzi (Kulczyński, 1899) – Spain, Madeira, Canary Is. Introduced to USA
- Heser stoevi Deltshev, 2016 – Turkmenistan
- Heser vijayanagara Bosselaers, 2010 – India
