= Parabonna =

Scientific classification
- Kingdom: Animalia
- Phylum: Arthropoda
- Subphylum: Chelicerata
- Class: Arachnida
- Order: Araneae
- Infraorder: Araneomorphae
- Family: Gnaphosidae
- Genus: Parabonna; Mello-Leitão, 1947
- Species: P. goffergei

Binomial name
- Parabonna goffergei Mello-Leitão, 1947

Genus of spiders

Parabonna is a monotypic genus of South American ground spiders containing the single species, Parabonna goffergei. It was first described by Cândido Firmino de Mello-Leitão in 1947, and has only been found in Brazil.
