= Zelowan =

Scientific classification
- Kingdom: Animalia
- Phylum: Arthropoda
- Subphylum: Chelicerata
- Class: Arachnida
- Order: Araneae
- Infraorder: Araneomorphae
- Family: Gnaphosidae
- Genus: Zelowan; Murphy & Russell-Smith, 2010

Type species
- Z. spiculiformis Murphy & Russell-Smith, 2010

Species
- 18, see text

Genus of spiders

Zelowan is a genus of African ground spiders that was first described by J. A. Murphy & A. Russell-Smith in 2010.

== Species ==
As of May 2019 it contains eighteen species:

- Zelowan allegena Murphy & Russell-Smith, 2010 – Congo
- Zelowan bulbiformis Murphy & Russell-Smith, 2010 – Congo
- Zelowan cochleare Murphy & Russell-Smith, 2010 – Congo
- Zelowan cordiformis Murphy & Russell-Smith, 2010 – Congo
- Zelowan cuniculiformis Murphy & Russell-Smith, 2010 – Congo
- Zelowan ensifer Murphy & Russell-Smith, 2010 – Congo
- Zelowan etruricassis Murphy & Russell-Smith, 2010 – Congo
- Zelowan falciformis Murphy & Russell-Smith, 2010 – Congo
- Zelowan galea Murphy & Russell-Smith, 2010 – Congo
- Zelowan larva Murphy & Russell-Smith, 2010 – Congo
- Zelowan mammosa Murphy & Russell-Smith, 2010 – Congo
- Zelowan nodivulva Murphy & Russell-Smith, 2010 – Burundi
- Zelowan pyriformis Murphy & Russell-Smith, 2010 – Congo
- Zelowan remota Murphy & Russell-Smith, 2010 – Namibia
- Zelowan rostrata Murphy & Russell-Smith, 2010 – Congo
- Zelowan rotundipalpis Murphy & Russell-Smith, 2010 – Congo
- Zelowan similis Murphy & Russell-Smith, 2010 – Congo
- Zelowan spiculiformis Murphy & Russell-Smith, 2010 (type) – Congo
