= Neodrassex =

Scientific classification
- Kingdom: Animalia
- Phylum: Arthropoda
- Subphylum: Chelicerata
- Class: Arachnida
- Order: Araneae
- Infraorder: Araneomorphae
- Family: Gnaphosidae
- Genus: Neodrassex; Ott, 2012

Type species
- N. aureus Ott, 2012

Species
- 5, see text

Genus of spiders

Neodrassex is a genus of South American ground spiders that was first described by R. Ott in 2012.

== Species ==
As of May 2019 it contains five species:

- Neodrassex aureus Ott, 2012 (type) – Brazil, Argentina
- Neodrassex cachimbo Ott, 2013 – Brazil
- Neodrassex ibirapuita Ott, 2013 – Brazil
- Neodrassex iguatemi Ott, 2012 – Brazil
- Neodrassex nordeste Ott, 2013 – Brazil
