= Allozelotes =

Scientific classification
- Kingdom: Animalia
- Phylum: Arthropoda
- Subphylum: Chelicerata
- Class: Arachnida
- Order: Araneae
- Infraorder: Araneomorphae
- Family: Gnaphosidae
- Genus: Allozelotes; Yin & Peng, 1998

Type species
- A. lushan Yin & Peng, 1998

Species
- 4, see text

Genus of spiders

Allozelotes is a genus of Chinese ground spiders that was first described by C. M. Yin & X. J. Peng in 1998.

== Species ==
As of October 2025, this genus includes five species:

- Allozelotes dianshi Yin & Peng, 1998 – China
- Allozelotes gyirongensis (Hu, 2001) – China
- Allozelotes lushan Yin & Peng, 1998 – China (type species)
- Allozelotes microsaccatus Yang, Z. S. Zhang, Y. G. Zhang & Kim, 2009 – China
- Allozelotes songi Yang, Z. S. Zhang, Y. G. Zhang & Kim, 2009 – China
