= Titus lugens =

Scientific classification
- Domain: Eukaryota
- Kingdom: Animalia
- Phylum: Arthropoda
- Subphylum: Chelicerata
- Class: Arachnida
- Order: Araneae
- Infraorder: Araneomorphae
- Family: Gnaphosidae
- Genus: Titus; O. Pickard-Cambridge, 1901
- Species: T. lugens

Binomial name
- Titus lugens O. Pickard-Cambridge, 1901

Genus of spiders

Titus is a monotypic genus of East African ground spiders containing the single species, Titus lugens. It was first described by O. Pickard-Cambridge in 1901, and has only been found in Zimbabwe.
