= Parasyrisca =

Scientific classification
- Domain: Eukaryota
- Kingdom: Animalia
- Phylum: Arthropoda
- Subphylum: Chelicerata
- Class: Arachnida
- Order: Araneae
- Infraorder: Araneomorphae
- Family: Gnaphosidae
- Genus: Parasyrisca; Schenkel, 1963

Type species
- P. potanini Schenkel, 1963

Species
- 54, see text

Genus of spiders

Parasyrisca is a genus of ground spiders that was first described by E. Schenkel in 1963. Originally placed with the sac spiders, it was moved to the Miturgidae in 1967, then to the ground spiders in 1988.

== Species ==
As of May 2019 it contains fifty-four species found throughout Europe to far eastern Asia, with the exception of P. orites, found in the United States and Canada:

- P. alai Ovtsharenko, Platnick & Marusik, 1995 – Kyrgyzstan, Pakistan
- P. alexeevi Ovtsharenko, Platnick & Marusik, 1995 – Russia (Caucasus)
- P. altaica Ovtsharenko, Platnick & Marusik, 1995 – Kazakhstan
- P. andarbag Ovtsharenko, Platnick & Marusik, 1995 – Tajikistan
- P. andreevae Ovtsharenko, Platnick & Marusik, 1995 – Tajikistan
- P. anzobica Ovtsharenko, Platnick & Marusik, 1995 – Tajikistan
- P. arrabonica Szinetár & Eichardt, 2009 – Hungary
- P. asiatica Ovtsharenko, Platnick & Marusik, 1995 – Russia (South Siberia), Mongolia
- P. balcarica Ovtsharenko, Platnick & Marusik, 1995 – Russia (Caucasus)
- P. belengish Ovtsharenko, Platnick & Marusik, 1995 – Russia (South Siberia)
- P. belukha Ovtsharenko, Platnick & Marusik, 1995 – Russia (South Siberia)
- P. birikchul Ovtsharenko, Platnick & Marusik, 1995 – Russia (South Siberia)
- P. breviceps (Kroneberg, 1875) – Tajikistan
- P. bucklei Marusik & Fomichev, 2010 – Russia (South Siberia)
- P. caucasica Ovtsharenko, Platnick & Marusik, 1995 – Russia (Caucasus)
- P. chikatunovi Ovtsharenko, Platnick & Marusik, 1995 – Tajikistan
- P. gissarika Ovtsharenko, Platnick & Marusik, 1995 – Tajikistan
- P. golyakovi Marusik & Fomichev, 2016 – Russia (South Siberia)
- P. guzeripli Ovtsharenko, Platnick & Marusik, 1995 – Russia (Caucasus)
- P. heimeri Ovtsharenko, Platnick & Marusik, 1995 – Mongolia
- P. helanshan Tang & Zhao, 1998 – China
- P. hippai Ovtsharenko, Platnick & Marusik, 1995 – Russia (South Siberia)
- P. holmi Ovtsharenko, Platnick & Marusik, 1995 – Russia (Far East, East Siberia)
- P. iskander Ovtsharenko, Platnick & Marusik, 1995 – Tajikistan
- P. khubsugul Ovtsharenko, Platnick & Marusik, 1995 – Mongolia
- P. koksu Ovtsharenko, Platnick & Marusik, 1995 – Kyrgyzstan
- P. kosachevi Fomichev, Marusik & Sidorov, 2018 – Mongolia
- P. kurgan Ovtsharenko, Platnick & Marusik, 1995 – Kyrgyzstan
- P. kyzylart Ovtsharenko, Platnick & Marusik, 1995 – Kyrgyzstan
- P. logunovi Ovtsharenko, Platnick & Marusik, 1995 – Russia (South Siberia)
- P. marusiki Kovblyuk, 2003 – Ukraine
- P. mikhailovi Ovtsharenko, Platnick & Marusik, 1995 – Russia (Caucasus)
- P. narynica Ovtsharenko, Platnick & Marusik, 1995 – Kyrgyzstan, Tajikistan
- P. orites (Chamberlin & Gertsch, 1940) – USA, Canada
- P. otmek Ovtsharenko, Platnick & Marusik, 1995 – Kyrgyzstan
- P. paironica Ovtsharenko, Platnick & Marusik, 1995 – Tajikistan
- P. pamirica Ovtsharenko, Platnick & Marusik, 1995 – Tajikistan
- P. potanini Schenkel, 1963 (type) – Russia (South Siberia), Mongolia, China
- P. pshartica Ovtsharenko, Platnick & Marusik, 1995 – Tajikistan
- P. schenkeli Ovtsharenko & Marusik, 1988 – Kazakhstan, Mongolia, China
- P. shakhristanica Ovtsharenko, Platnick & Marusik, 1995 – Tajikistan
- P. sollers (Simon, 1895) – Mongolia, China
- P. songi Marusik & Fritzén, 2009 – China
- P. sulaki Fomichev, Marusik & Sidorov, 2018 – Kazakhstan
- P. susamyr Ovtsharenko, Platnick & Marusik, 1995 – Kyrgyzstan
- P. terskei Ovtsharenko, Platnick & Marusik, 1995 – Kyrgyzstan
- P. tronovorum Fomichev, Marusik & Sidorov, 2018 – Mongolia
- P. turkenica Ovtsharenko, Platnick & Marusik, 1995 – Turkey
- P. tyshchenkoi Ovtsharenko, Platnick & Marusik, 1995 – Russia (South and East Siberia)
- P. ulykpani Ovtsharenko, Platnick & Marusik, 1995 – Russia (South Siberia), Mongolia
- P. vakhanski Ovtsharenko, Platnick & Marusik, 1995 – Tajikistan
- P. vinosa (Simon, 1878) – Europe (Alps, Pyrenees)
- P. volynkini Fomichev, 2016 – Russia (South Siberia)
- P. vorobica Ovtsharenko, Platnick & Marusik, 1995 – Tajikistan
