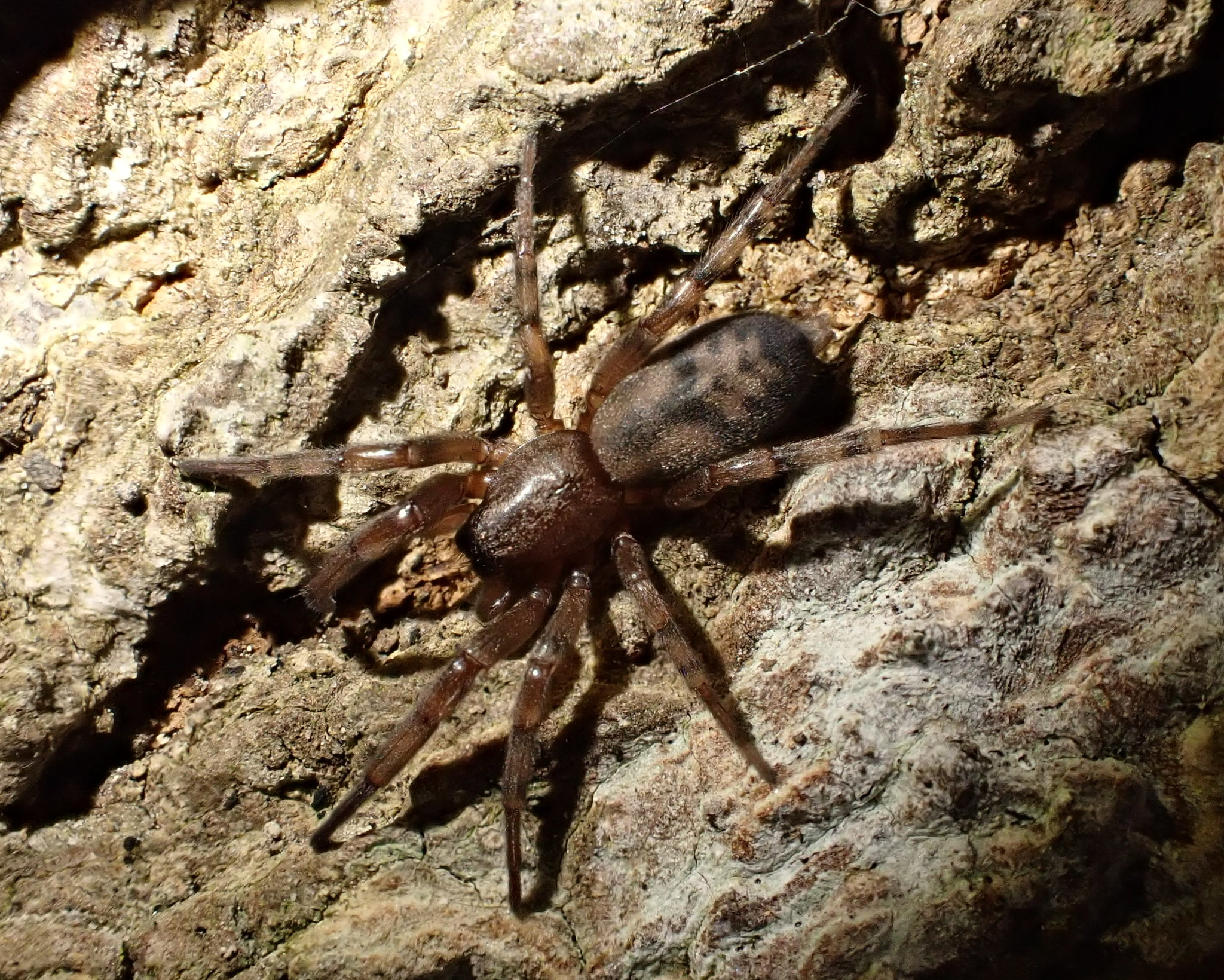

Scientific classification
- Domain: Eukaryota
- Kingdom: Animalia
- Phylum: Arthropoda
- Subphylum: Chelicerata
- Class: Arachnida
- Order: Araneae
- Infraorder: Araneomorphae
- Family: Gnaphosidae
- Genus: Intruda; Forster, 1979
- Species: I. signata

Binomial name
- Intruda signata (Hogg, 1900)

= Intruda =

Genus of spiders

Intruda is a monotypic genus of South Pacific ground spiders containing the single species, Intruda signata. It was first described by Raymond Robert Forster in 1979, and has only been found in Australia and in New Zealand.
