= Latica =

Scientific classification
- Kingdom: Animalia
- Phylum: Arthropoda
- Subphylum: Chelicerata
- Class: Arachnida
- Order: Araneae
- Infraorder: Araneomorphae
- Family: Gnaphosidae
- Genus: Latica da Silva, Guerrero, Bidegaray-Batista & Simó, 2020
- Species: L. galeanoi

Binomial name
- Latica galeanoi da Silva, Guerrero, Bidegaray-Batista & Simó, 2020

Genus of spiders

Latica is a monotypic genus of South American ground spiders containing the single species, Latica galeanoi. It was first described by B. A. da Silva, J. C. Guerrero and L. Bidegaray-Batista in 2020 and placed into the subfamily Herpyllinae.
