= Civizelotes =

Scientific classification
- Kingdom: Animalia
- Phylum: Arthropoda
- Subphylum: Chelicerata
- Class: Arachnida
- Order: Araneae
- Infraorder: Araneomorphae
- Family: Gnaphosidae
- Genus: Civizelotes; Senglet, 2012

Type species
- C. civicus (Simon, 1878)

Species
- 12, see text

Genus of spiders

Civizelotes is a genus of ground spiders that was first described by A. Senglet in 2012.

== Species ==
As of December 2021, it contains twelve species:

- Civizelotes aituar Esyunin & Tuneva, 2020 – Russia (Europe)
- Civizelotes akmon Chatzaki, 2021 – Greece
- Civizelotes caucasius (L. Koch, 1866) – Europe, Turkey, Caucasus, Kazakhstan, Iran, Central Asia, China
- Civizelotes civicus (Simon, 1878) (type) – Europe, Madeira, Morocco
- Civizelotes dentatidens (Simon, 1914) – Spain, France, Italy (mainland, Sardinia)
- Civizelotes gracilis (Canestrini, 1868) – Central and South-Eastern Europe, Caucasus (Russia, Georgia), Turkey
- Civizelotes ibericus Senglet, 2012 – Spain, France
- Civizelotes medianoides Senglet, 2012 – Spain
- Civizelotes medianus (Denis, 1936) – Spain, Andorra, France
- Civizelotes pygmaeus (Miller, 1943) – Europe to Kazakhstan
- Civizelotes solstitialis (Levy, 1998) – Italy (Sardinia), Bulgaria, Greece, Turkey, Cyprus, Israel, Iran, Kazakhstan, Kyrgyzstan, Tajikistan, Pakistan
- Civizelotes tibichaetoforus Tuneva & Kuzmin, 2016 – Russia (Europe)
