= Sorkinius =

Scientific classification
- Kingdom: Animalia
- Phylum: Arthropoda
- Subphylum: Chelicerata
- Class: Arachnida
- Order: Araneae
- Infraorder: Araneomorphae
- Family: Gnaphosidae
- Genus: Sorkinius; Sherwood, Jocqué, Cazanove & Derepas, 2025

Type species
- Drassus maillardi Vinson, 1863

Species
- 3, see text

Genus of spiders

Sorkinius is a genus of spiders in the family Gnaphosidae. Sorkinius is found in East Africa (Ethiopia, Tanzania, South Africa), the Arabian Peninsula (Yemen), and the Indian Ocean islands (Seychelles, Réunion). The genus name honors arachnologist Louis N. Sorkin.

As of January 2026, this genus includes three species:

- Sorkinius coruscus (L. Koch, 1875) – Ethiopia, Tanzania, South Africa, Yemen
- Sorkinius kibonotensis (Tullgren, 1910) – Tanzania
- Sorkinius maillardi (Vinson, 1863) – Seychelles, Réunion
