= Symphanodes =

Scientific classification
- Kingdom: Animalia
- Phylum: Arthropoda
- Subphylum: Chelicerata
- Class: Arachnida
- Order: Araneae
- Infraorder: Araneomorphae
- Family: Gnaphosidae
- Genus: Symphanodes; Rainbow, 1916
- Species: S. dianiphus

Binomial name
- Symphanodes dianiphus Rainbow, 1916

Genus of spiders

Symphanodes is a monotypic genus of Australian ground spiders containing the single species, Symphanodes dianiphus. It was first described by William Joseph Rainbow in 1916, and has only been found in Australia.
