= Sanitubius =

Scientific classification
- Domain: Eukaryota
- Kingdom: Animalia
- Phylum: Arthropoda
- Subphylum: Chelicerata
- Class: Arachnida
- Order: Araneae
- Infraorder: Araneomorphae
- Family: Gnaphosidae
- Genus: Sanitubius; Kamura, 2001
- Species: S. anatolicus

Binomial name
- Sanitubius anatolicus (Kamura, 1989)

Genus of spiders

Sanitubius is a monotypic genus of Asian ground spiders containing the single species, Sanitubius anatolicus. It was first described by T. Kamura in 2001, and has only been found in China, in Korea, and in Japan.
