= Gaviphosa =

Scientific classification
- Kingdom: Animalia
- Phylum: Arthropoda
- Subphylum: Chelicerata
- Class: Arachnida
- Order: Araneae
- Infraorder: Araneomorphae
- Family: Gnaphosidae
- Genus: Gaviphosa; Sankaran, 2021
- Species: G. kera

Binomial name
- Gaviphosa kera Sankaran, 2021

Genus of spiders

Gaviphosa is a monotypic genus of south Asian ground spiders containing the single species, Gaviphosa kera. It was first described by P. M. Sankaran and J. T. D. Caleb in 2021, and it has only been found in India.
