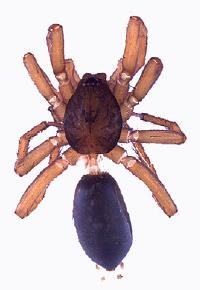
- Zelotibia fosseyae

Scientific classification
- Kingdom: Animalia
- Phylum: Arthropoda
- Subphylum: Chelicerata
- Class: Arachnida
- Order: Araneae
- Infraorder: Araneomorphae
- Family: Gnaphosidae
- Genus: Zelotibia; Russell-Smith & Murphy, 2005

Type species
- Z. mitella Russell-Smith & Murphy, 2005

Species
- 22, see text

= Zelotibia =

Genus of spiders

Zelotibia is a genus of African ground spiders that was first described by A. Russell-Smith & J. A. Murphy in 2005.

== Species ==
As of May 2019 it contains twenty-two species:

- Zelotibia acicula Russell-Smith & Murphy, 2005 – Congo
- Zelotibia angelica Nzigidahera & Jocqué, 2009 – Burundi
- Zelotibia bicornuta Russell-Smith & Murphy, 2005 – Tanzania
- Zelotibia cultella Russell-Smith & Murphy, 2005 – Congo
- Zelotibia curvifemur Nzigidahera & Jocqué, 2009 – Burundi
- Zelotibia dolabra Russell-Smith & Murphy, 2005 – Congo
- Zelotibia filiformis Russell-Smith & Murphy, 2005 – Congo, Burundi
- Zelotibia flexuosa Russell-Smith & Murphy, 2005 – Congo, Rwanda
- Zelotibia fosseyae Nzigidahera & Jocqué, 2009 – Burundi
- Zelotibia johntony Nzigidahera & Jocqué, 2009 – Congo
- Zelotibia kaibos Russell-Smith & Murphy, 2005 – Kenya
- Zelotibia kanama Nzigidahera & Jocqué, 2009 – Rwanda
- Zelotibia kibira Nzigidahera & Jocqué, 2009 – Burundi
- Zelotibia lejeunei Nzigidahera & Jocqué, 2009 – Congo
- Zelotibia major Russell-Smith & Murphy, 2005 – Burundi
- Zelotibia mitella Russell-Smith & Murphy, 2005 (type) – Congo
- Zelotibia papillata Russell-Smith & Murphy, 2005 – Congo, Rwanda
- Zelotibia paucipapillata Russell-Smith & Murphy, 2005 – Congo, Burundi
- Zelotibia scobina Russell-Smith & Murphy, 2005 – Congo
- Zelotibia simpula Russell-Smith & Murphy, 2005 – Congo, Kenya
- Zelotibia subsessa Nzigidahera & Jocqué, 2009 – Burundi
- Zelotibia supercilia Russell-Smith & Murphy, 2005 – Congo
