= Canariognapha =

Scientific classification
- Domain: Eukaryota
- Kingdom: Animalia
- Phylum: Arthropoda
- Subphylum: Chelicerata
- Class: Arachnida
- Order: Araneae
- Infraorder: Araneomorphae
- Family: Gnaphosidae
- Genus: Canariognapha; Wunderlich, 2011
- Species: C. parwis

Binomial name
- Canariognapha parwis Wunderlich, 2011

Genus of spiders

Canariognapha is a monotypic genus of European ground spiders containing the single species, Canariognapha parwis. It was first described by J. Wunderlich in 2011, and has only been found in Spain.
