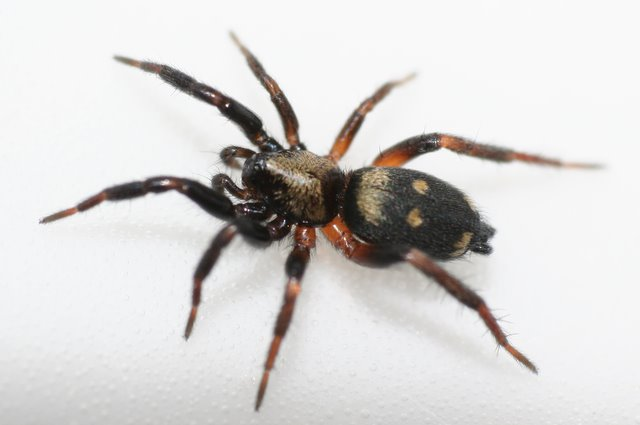
- Callilepis nocturna, a ground spider found in the Palearctic realm
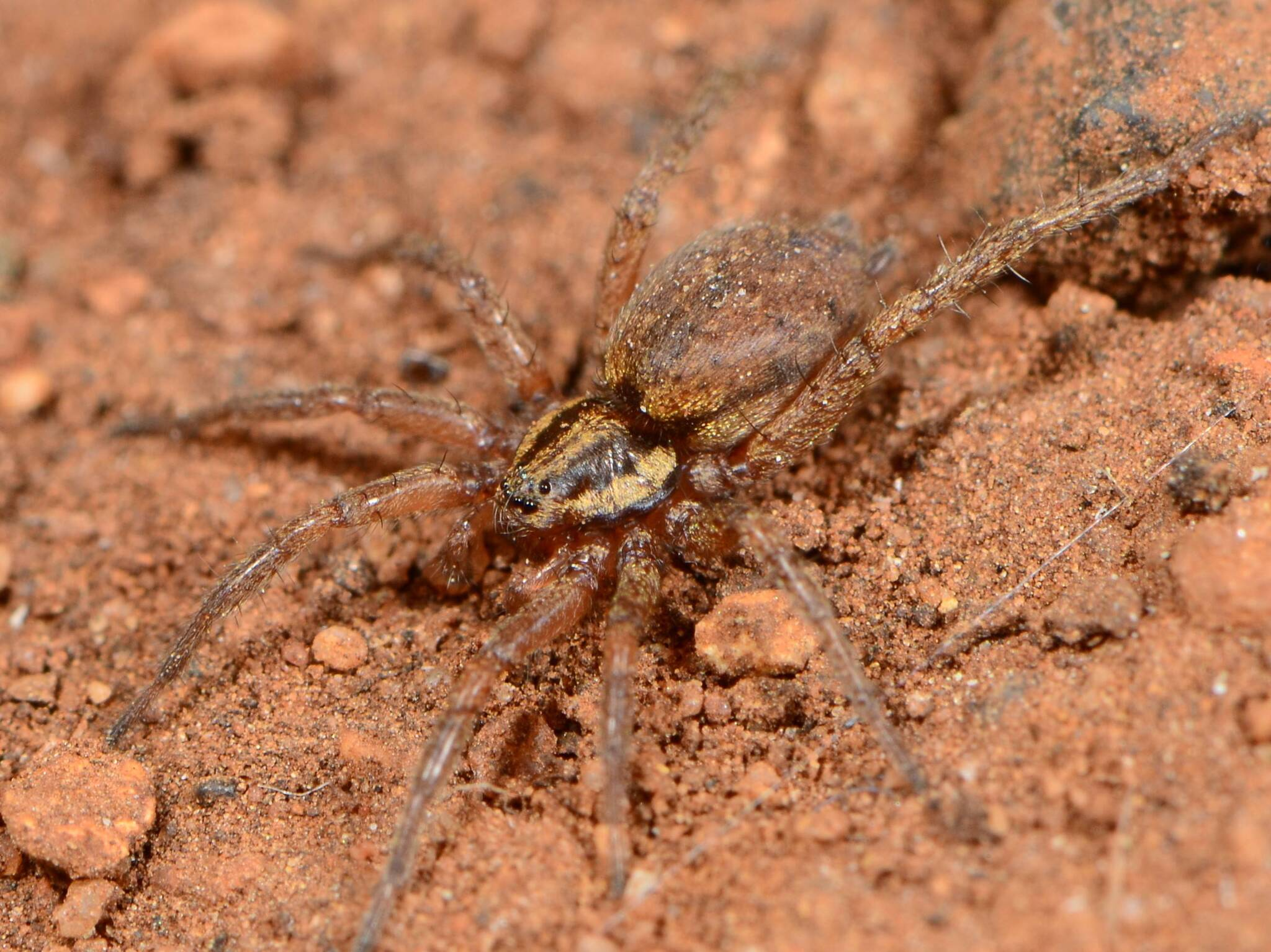
- female Asemesthes ceresicola from South Africa

Scientific classification
- Kingdom: Animalia
- Phylum: Arthropoda
- Subphylum: Chelicerata
- Class: Arachnida
- Order: Araneae
- Infraorder: Araneomorphae
- Family: Gnaphosidae; Banks, 1892

Diversity
- 154 genera, 2,498 species
- blue: reported countries (WSC) green: observation hotspots (iNaturalist)

= Ground spider =

Ground spiders Temporal range: Cretaceous–present

Family of spiders

Ground spiders comprise Gnaphosidae, the seventh largest spider family with about 2,500 described species in over 100 genera distributed worldwide. There are 105 species known to central Europe, and common genera include Gnaphosa, Drassodes, Micaria, Cesonia, Zelotes and many others. They are closely related to Clubionidae. At present, no ground spiders are known to be seriously venomous to humans.

== Hunting behavior ==
Ground spiders hunt by active foraging, chasing down and subduing individual prey items. They are adapted to hunting large and potentially dangerous prey, including other spiders, which they subdue by using their silk. When hunting, ground spiders produce thick, gluey silk from their enlarged spinnerets and attempt to use it to entangle their prey in swathing attacks, often applying their webbing to their prey's legs and mouths. By immobilizing potential prey in this manner, ground spiders can subdue proportionally large creatures while reducing risk of injury to themselves from their prey's attempts to fight back.

== Description ==
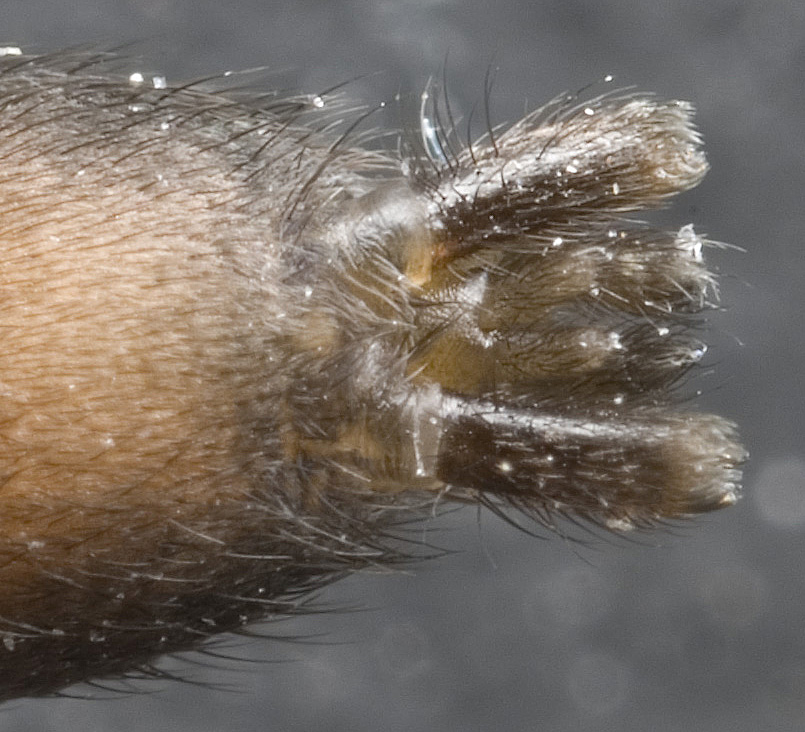
Spinnerets of Herpyllus ecclesiasticus

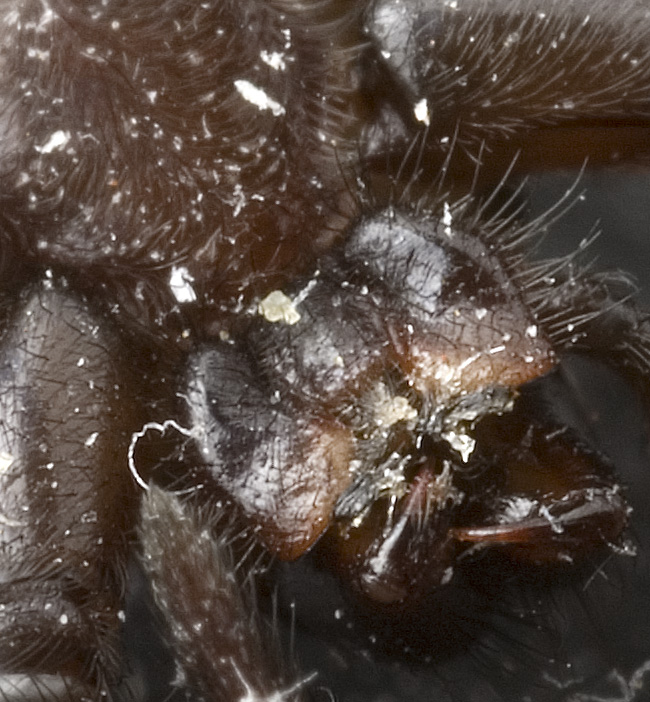
Endites and labium (also fangs and sternum)

Generally, ground spiders are characterized by having barrel-shaped anterior spinnerets that are one spinneret diameter apart. The main exception to this rule is found in the ant-mimicking genus Micaria. Another characteristic is an indentation in the endites (paired mouthparts anterior and lateral to the labium, or lip). All ground spiders lack a prey-capture web and generally run prey down on the surface. They hunt at night and spend the day in a silken retreat.

The genitalia are diverse and are a good model for studying the evolution of genitalia because of their peculiar copulatory mechanism. The thick-walled egg sacs are guarded by the mother until the spiderlings hatch.

== Genera ==
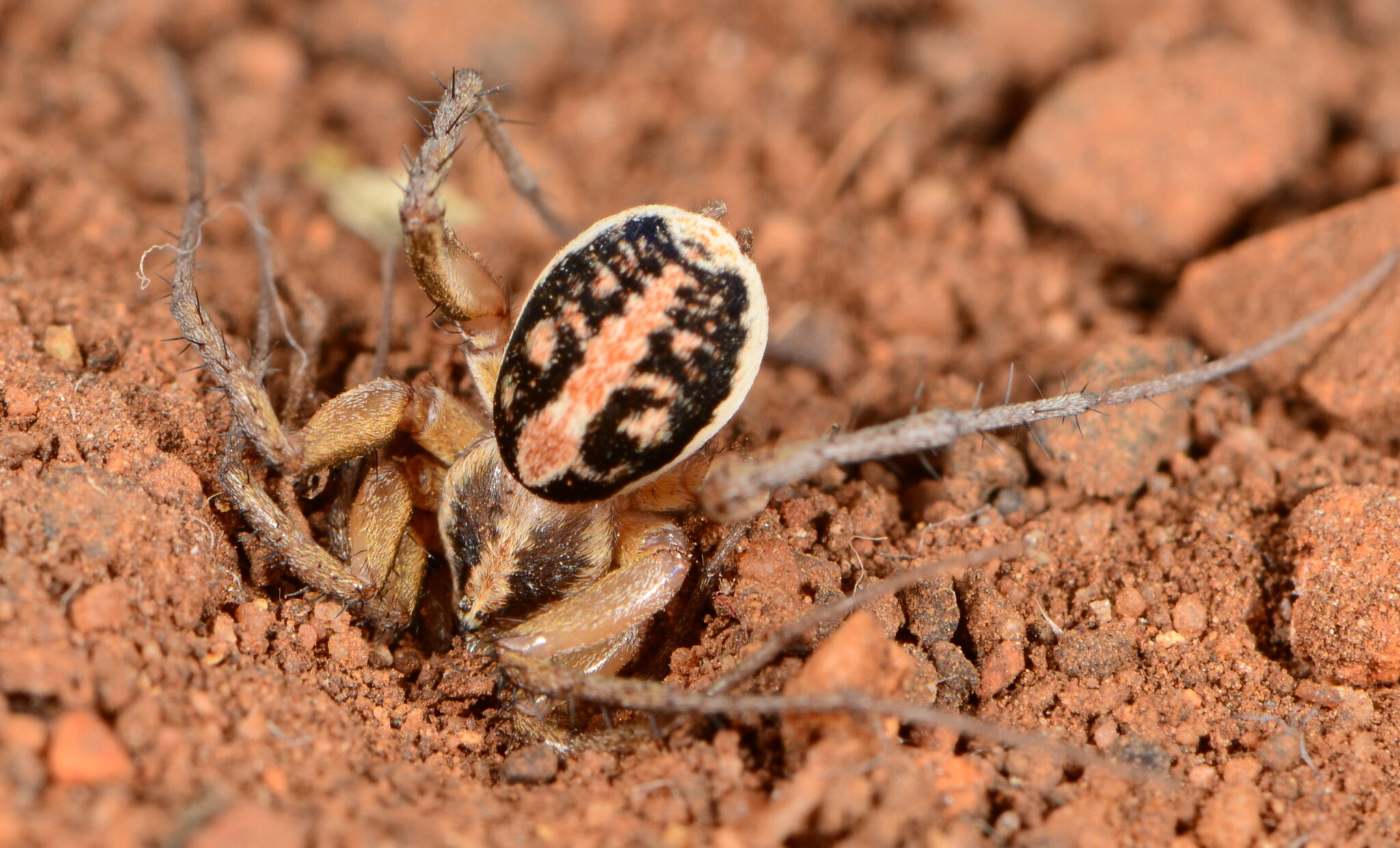
female Ammoxenus amphalodes

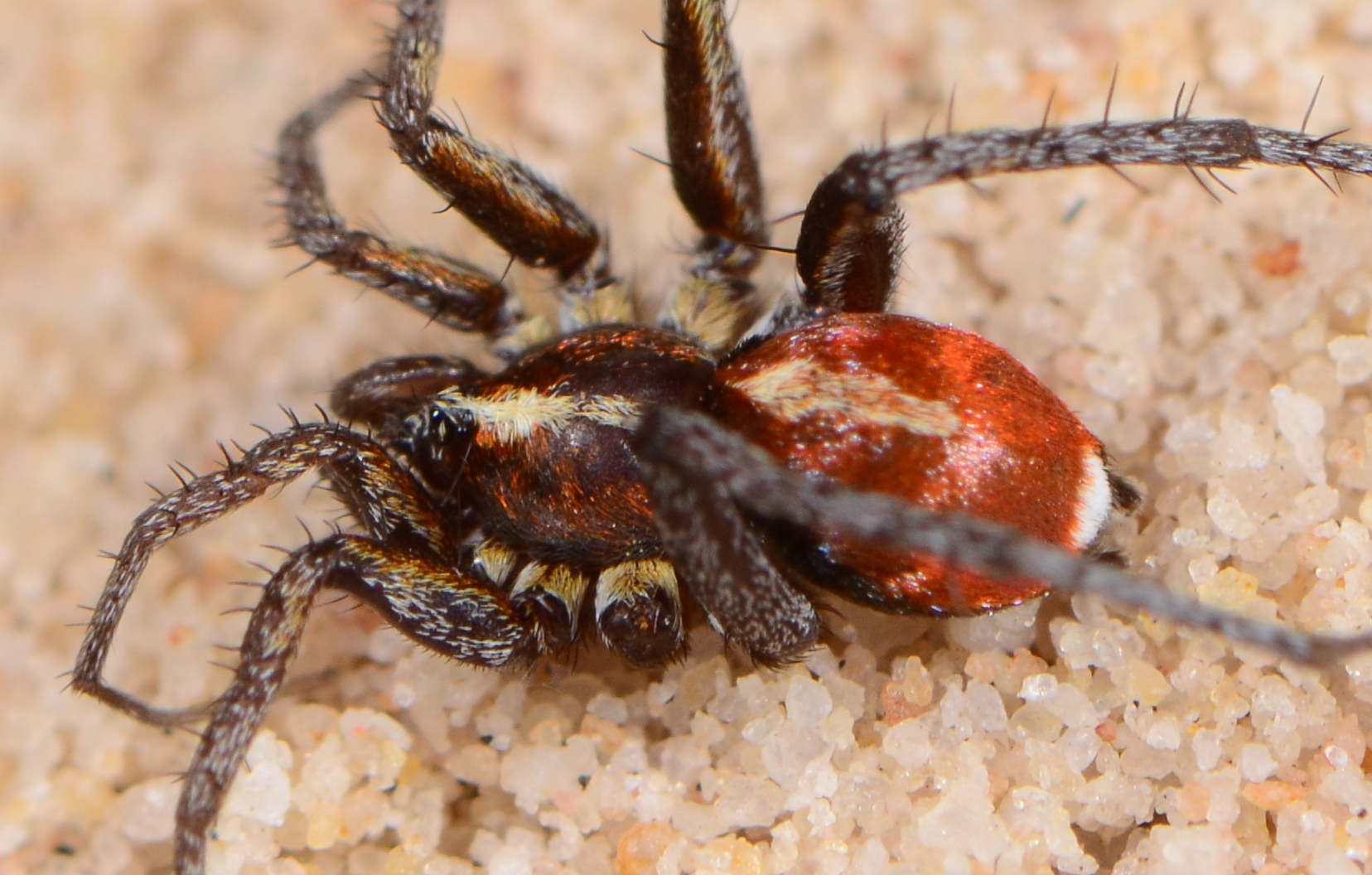
male A. amphalodes

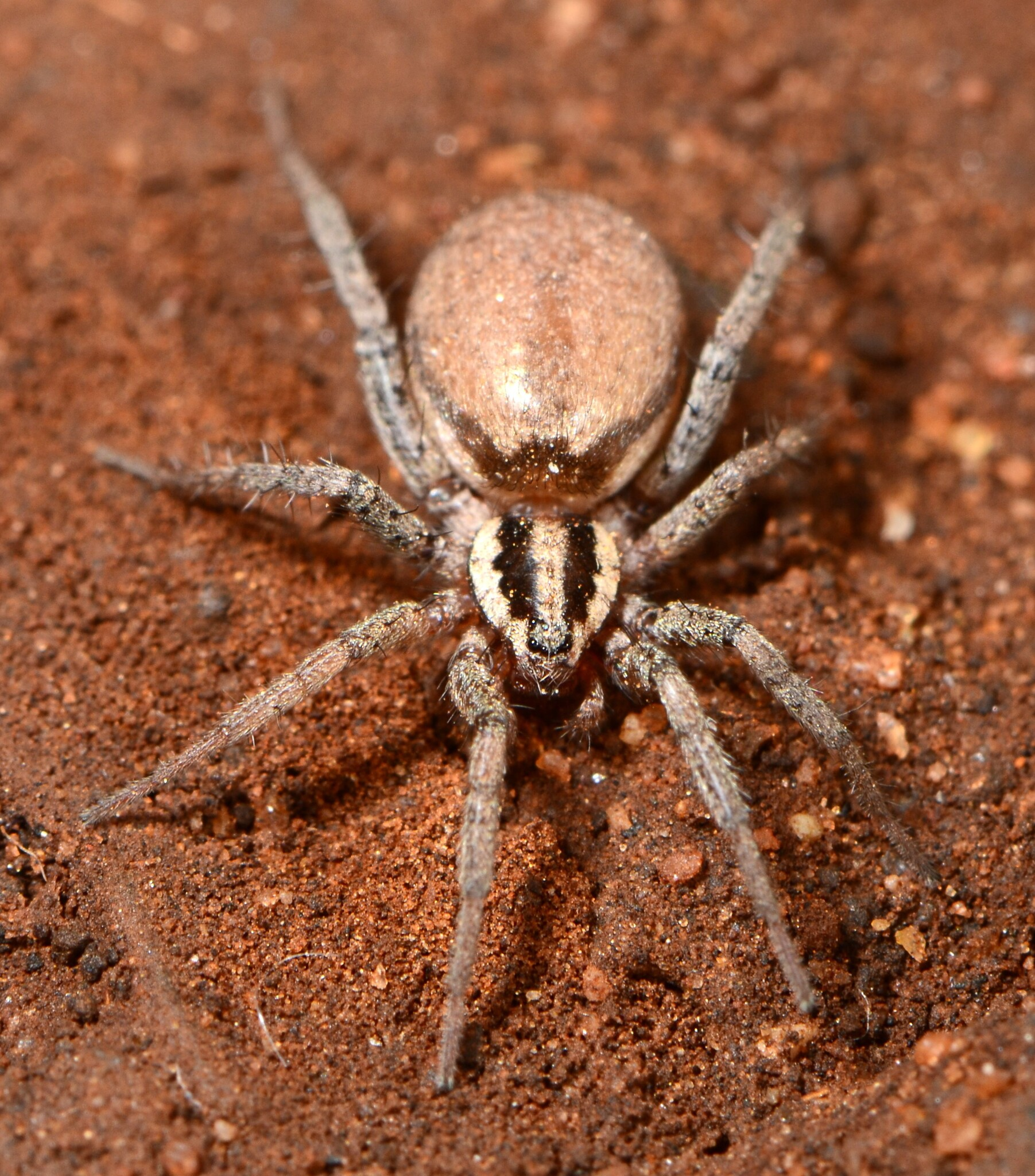
Asemesthes flavipes

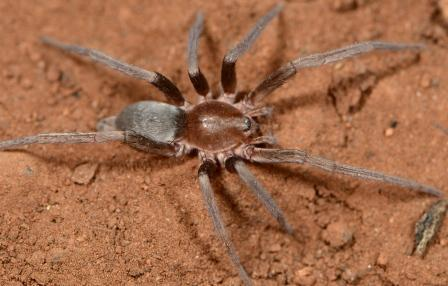
male Theuma elucubata

As of January 2026, this family includes 154 genera and 2,498 species:

- Afrodrassex Haddad & Booysen, 2022 – Angola, South Africa
- Algarvezelotes Wunderlich, 2023 – Portugal
- Allomicythus Ono, 2009 – China, Vietnam
- Allozelotes Yin & Peng, 1998 – China
- Almafuerte Grismado & Carrión, 2017 – Argentina, Bolivia, Uruguay
- Amazoromus Brescovit & Höfer, 1994 – Brazil
- Ammoxenus Simon, 1893 – Southern Africa
- Amusia Tullgren, 1910 – South Africa, East Africa
- Anagraphis Simon, 1893 – Ethiopia, Libya, Asia, Russia, Southern Europe, East Africa
- Anagrina Berland, 1920 – Kenya, Niger
- Aneplasa Tucker, 1923 – Angola, South Africa, East Africa
- Anzacia Dalmas, 1919 – Oceania
- Aphantaulax Simon, 1878 – Africa, Asia, Russia, France, Australia, North Africa, São Tomé and Príncipe
- Apodrassodes Vellard, 1924 – Costa Rica, Guatemala, Mexico, South America
- Apodrassus Chamberlin, 1916 – Peru
- Aponetius Kamura, 2020 – Japan
- Apopyllus Platnick & Shadab, 1984 – Bonaire, Curaçao, Mexico, South America
- Arauchemus Ott & Brescovit, 2012 – Brazil
- Asemesthes Simon, 1887 – Angola, Ethiopia, Southern Africa
- Asiabadus Roewer, 1961 – Central Asia
- Australoechemus Schmidt & Piepho, 1994 – Cape Verde, Ascension Is
- Austrammo Platnick, 2002 – Australia
- Avstroneulanda Zakharov & Ovtsharenko, 2022 – Australia, Papua New Guinea
- Barrowammo Platnick, 2002 – Australia
- Benoitodes Platnick, 1993 – St. Helena
- Berinda Roewer, 1928 – Tanzania, Egypt, Western Asia, Cyprus, Greece. Introduced to Japan
- Berlandina Dalmas, 1922 – Africa, Asia, Alps, Mediterranean to Central Asia
- Cabanadrassus Mello-Leitão, 1941 – Argentina
- Callilepis Westring, 1874 – Asia, Europe, Mexico, North America
- Callipelis Zamani & Marusik, 2017 – Iran
- Camillina Berland, 1919 – Africa, Italy, North America, South America. Introduced to Malaysia
- Canariognapha Wunderlich, 2011 – Canary Islands
- Ceryerda Simon, 1909 – Australia
- Cesonia Simon, 1893 – Turkey, Cyprus, Greece, North America, Azerbaijan, Bahama Is, Dominican Rep, Nevis, St, St. Kitts, Vincent, Virgin Is
- Chatzakia Lissner & Bosmans, 2016 – Spain
- Civizelotes Senglet, 2012 – Morocco, Asia, Europe
- Cladothela Kishida, 1928 – China, Japan, Korea
- Coillina Yin & Peng, 1998 – China, Myanmar, India
- Coreodrassus Paik, 1984 – Asia
- Cryptodrassus Miller, 1943 – Algeria, Morocco, Tunisia, Asia, Russia, Southern Europe
- Cryptoerithus Rainbow, 1915 – Australia
- Cubanopyllus Alayón & Platnick, 1993 – Cuba
- Dai Liu & Zhang, 2024 – China
- Diaphractus Purcell, 1907 – Southern Africa, East Africa
- Drassodes Westring, 1851 – Africa, Asia, Europe, North America, Brazil, Chile, Peru
- Drassodex Murphy, 2007 – Turkey, Germany, Switzerland, Italy, Spain, France
- Drassyllus Chamberlin, 1922 – Asia, Mexico, North America, Europe
- Echemella Strand, 1906 – DR Congo, Ethiopia
- Echemographis Caporiacco, 1955 – Venezuela
- Echemoides Mello-Leitão, 1938 – South America
- Echemus Simon, 1878 – Africa, Asia, southern Europe, Australia
- Eilica Keyserling, 1891 – South Africa, Zimbabwe, India, Cuba, Jamaica, Panama, Australia, South America, USA to Honduras
- Encoptarthria Main, 1954 – Australia
- Epicharitus Rainbow, 1916 – Australia
- Fedotovia Charitonov, 1946 – Afghanistan, Mongolia, Iran
- Gaviphosa Sankaran, 2021 – India
- Gertschosa Platnick & Shadab, 1981 – Jamaica, Panama, Mexico, United States
- Gnaphosa Latreille, 1804 – North Africa, Europe, North America, Asia, Central America
- Haplodrassus Chamberlin, 1922 – Africa, Asia, Europe, North America
- Herpyllus Hentz, 1832 – Afghanistan, Turkmenistan, Korea, Mexico, North America, Argentina
- Heser Tuneva, 2004 – Algeria, Kazakhstan, Turkmenistan, India, Mediterranean. Introduced to Burkina Faso, Mexico, United States
- Hitobia Kamura, 1992 – Asia
- Homoeothele Simon, 1908 – Australia
- Hongkongia Song & Zhu, 1998 – Guinea-Bissau, Ivory Coast, China, Japan, Taiwan, Indonesia, Philippines, India
- Hotwheels Liu & Zhang, 2024 – China
- Hypodrassodes Dalmas, 1919 – Australia, New Caledonia, New Zealand
- Ibala FitzPatrick, 2009 – Mozambique, Southern Africa
- Intruda Forster, 1979 – Australia. Introduced to New Zealand
- Iranotricha Zamani & Marusik, 2018 – Iran
- Kaitawa Forster, 1979 – New Zealand
- Kikongo Rodrigues & Rheims, 2020 – Kenya, D.R. Congo
- Kishidaia Yaginuma, 1960 – Asia, Russia, Italy
- Kituba Rodrigues & Rheims, 2020 – D.R. Congo
- Ladissa Simon, 1907 – Benin, Sierra Leone, Pakistan
- Laronius Platnick & Deeleman-Reinhold, 2001 – China, Indonesia, Thailand
- Lasophorus Chatzaki, 2018 – Turkey, Cyprus, Greece
- Latica Silva, Guerrero, Bidegaray-Batista & Simó, 2020 – Argentina, Uruguay
- Latonigena Simon, 1893 – South America
- Leptodrassex Murphy, 2007 – Mozambique, Algeria, Libya, South Africa, Lebanon, Portugal, Spain, France
- Leptodrassus Simon, 1878 – Ethiopia, Algeria, Libya, Tunisia, South Africa, Sierra Leone, Israel, Azores, Canary Islands, Southern Europe, Mexico
- Leptopilos Levy, 2009 – Africa, Asia, Bulgaria, Ukraine, Russia, Greece
- Litopyllus Chamberlin, 1922 – Bahamas, Cuba, Mexico, United States
- Macarophaeus Wunderlich, 2011 – Canary Islands, Madeira
- Marinarozelotes Ponomarev, 2020 – Ethiopia, Algeria, Egypt, Asia, Europe. Introduced to South Africa, Senegal, St. Helena, Hawaii, Mexico, United States, Samoa, South America, Ascension Is
- Marjanus Chatzaki, 2018 – China, Iran, Turkey, Greece
- Marusik Lin & Li, 2023 – Vietnam
- Matua Forster, 1979 – New Zealand
- Megamyrmaekion Reuss, 1834 – Africa, India, Iran, Israel, Australia
- Meizhelan Lin & Li, 2023 – China
- Micaria Westring, 1851 – Africa, Asia, Europe, North America, Australia
- Microdrassus Dalmas, 1919 – Seychelles
- Microsa Platnick & Shadab, 1977 – Cuba, Bahama Is, Virgin Is
- Micythus Thorell, 1897 – China, Indonesia, Myanmar, Thailand
- Minosia Dalmas, 1921 – Africa, Kazakhstan, Turkmenistan, Western Asia, Spain, France
- Minosiella Dalmas, 1921 – Somalia, Northern Africa, Afghanistan, Western Asia, Greece
- Molycria Simon, 1887 – Australia
- Montebello Hogg, 1914 – Australia
- Myandra Simon, 1887 – Australia
- Nauhea Forster, 1979 – New Zealand
- Neodrassex Ott, 2012 – Argentina, Brazil
- Nodocion Chamberlin, 1922 – Canada, Mexico, United States
- Nomindra Platnick & Baehr, 2006 – Australia, Southern Australia
- Nomisia Dalmas, 1921 – Africa, Asia, Europe, Mediterranean, Middle East
- Notiodrassus Bryant, 1935 – New Zealand
- Odontodrassus Jézéquel, 1965 – Egypt, South Africa, Ivory Coast, Asia, Russia, New Caledonia, North Africa, Salomon Is. Introduced to Seychelles, Jamaica, Pacific Is
- Orodrassus Chamberlin, 1922 – Canada, United States
- Parabonna Mello-Leitão, 1947 – Brazil
- Parasyrisca Schenkel, 1963 – Asia, Hungary, Ukraine, Russia, North America
- Phaeocedus Simon, 1893 – Asia, Russia, Southern Europe, France
- Platnickus Liu & Zhang, 2023 – China
- Poecilochroa Westring, 1874 – Africa, Korea, Indonesia, Philippines, India, Canary Islands, Italy, Portugal, Spain, France, French Polynesia, Brazil, Galapagos, Peru, Europe to Central Asia, São Tomé and Príncipe
- Pseudodrassus Caporiacco, 1935 – Libya, China, Turkey
- Pterotricha Kulczyński, 1903 – Africa, Asia, Russia, Southern Europe
- Pterotrichina Dalmas, 1921 – Northern Africa, Pakistan, Malta
- Rastellus Platnick & Griffin, 1990 – Southern Africa
- Sanitubius Kamura, 2001 – China, Japan, Korea
- Scopoides Platnick, 1989 – Mexico, United States
- Scotocesonia Caporiacco, 1947 – Guyana
- Scotognapha Dalmas, 1920 – Canary Islands, Savage Is
- Scotophaeus Simon, 1893 – Africa, Asia, Europe, New Zealand, Argentina, East Africa, Salvages. Introduced to Hawaii, Peru
- Sergiolus Simon, 1892 – China, Japan, Korea, North America
- Sernokorba Kamura, 1992 – China, Japan, Korea, Hungary, Bulgaria, Russia, Spain, France
- Setaphis Simon, 1893 – Africa, Asia, Canary Islands, Southern Europe
- Shaitan Kovblyuk, Kastrygina & Marusik, 2013 – Kazakhstan, Azerbaijan, Iran, Russia
- Shiragaia Paik, 1992 – Korea
- Sidydrassus Esyunin & Tuneva, 2002 – Kazakhstan, China, Mongolia, Azerbaijan, Iran, Russia
- Smionia Dalmas, 1920 – Mozambique, Botswana, South Africa, Cape Verde
- Solitudes Lin & Li, 2020 – China
- Sorkinius Sherwood, Jocqué, Cazanove & Derepas, 2025 – Eastern Africa, South Africa, Yemen
- Sosticus Chamberlin, 1922 – Kazakhstan, China, Caucasus, Iran, Russia, Canada, United States
- Symphanodes Rainbow, 1916 – Australia
- Synaphosus Platnick & Shadab, 1980 – Africa, Asia, Europe, United States. Introduced to Cape Verde, Mexico, Ascension Island
- Talanites Simon, 1893 – Egypt, Tunisia, Asia, Ukraine, Russia, Cyprus, Mexico, United States
- Talanitoides Levy, 2009 – Israel
- Titus O. Pickard-Cambridge, 1901 – Zimbabwe
- Trachyzelotes Lohmander, 1944 – Caucasus, Iran, Turkey
- Trephopoda Tucker, 1923 – Botswana, Namibia, South Africa
- Trichothyse Tucker, 1923 – Africa, Tajikistan, Uzbekistan, India, Iran, Israel, Turkey, Europe, Portugal to Turkmenistan. Introduced to Cape Verde
- Turkozelotes Kovblyuk & Seyyar, 2009 – Morocco, Kazakhstan, Western Asia, Europe
- Urozelotes Mello-Leitão, 1938 – Zambia, India, Russia, Italy, Portugal, France. Introduced to Australia, both Americas, tropical Africa
- Verita Ramírez & Grismado, 2016 – Argentina
- Wesmaldra Platnick & Baehr, 2006 – Australia
- Wydundra Platnick & Baehr, 2006 – Australia, Indonesia, Malaysia
- Xerophaeus Purcell, 1907 – Africa, Yemen
- Xizangiana Sherwood, Li & Zhang, 2022 – China, India
- Yoruba Rodrigues & Rheims, 2020 – Ivory Coast, Nigeria
- Yuqilin Lin & Li, 2023 – China
- Zagrotes Zamani, Chatzaki, Esyunin & Marusik, 2021 – Iran
- Zelanda Özdikmen, 2009 – New Zealand
- Zelominor Snazell & Murphy, 1997 – Algeria, Portugal, Spain
- Zelotes Gistel, 1848 – Africa, Asia, Europe, North America to South America
- Zelotibia Russell-Smith & Murphy, 2005 – Congo, Eastern Africa
- Zelowan Murphy & Russell-Smith, 2010 – Congo, Burundi, Namibia
- Zimiromus Banks, 1914 – Jamaica, Trinidad, Costa Rica, Nicaragua, Panama, Mexico, South America, Bahama Is, Virgin Is
