= Phaeocedus =

Scientific classification
- Domain: Eukaryota
- Kingdom: Animalia
- Phylum: Arthropoda
- Subphylum: Chelicerata
- Class: Arachnida
- Order: Araneae
- Infraorder: Araneomorphae
- Family: Gnaphosidae
- Genus: Phaeocedus; Simon, 1893

Type species
- P. braccatus (L. Koch, 1866)

Species
- 5, see text

Genus of spiders

Phaeocedus is a genus of ground spiders that was first described by Eugène Simon in 1893.

== Species ==
As of November 2021 it contains five species and one subspecies:

- Phaeocedus braccatus (L. Koch, 1866) (type) – Europe, Turkey, Caucasus, Russia (Europe to Far East), Iran, Kazakhstan, Central Asia, China, Japan
  - Phaeocedus b. jugorum Simon, 1914 – France
- Phaeocedus fedotovi Charitonov, 1946 – Uzbekistan
- Phaeocedus hebraeus Levy, 1999 – Greece, Cyprus, Israel
- Phaeocedus mikha Levy, 2009 – Israel, Portugal
- Phaeocedus vankeeri Chatzaki, 2019 – France (incl. Corsica), Greece (Rhodes, Symi)
