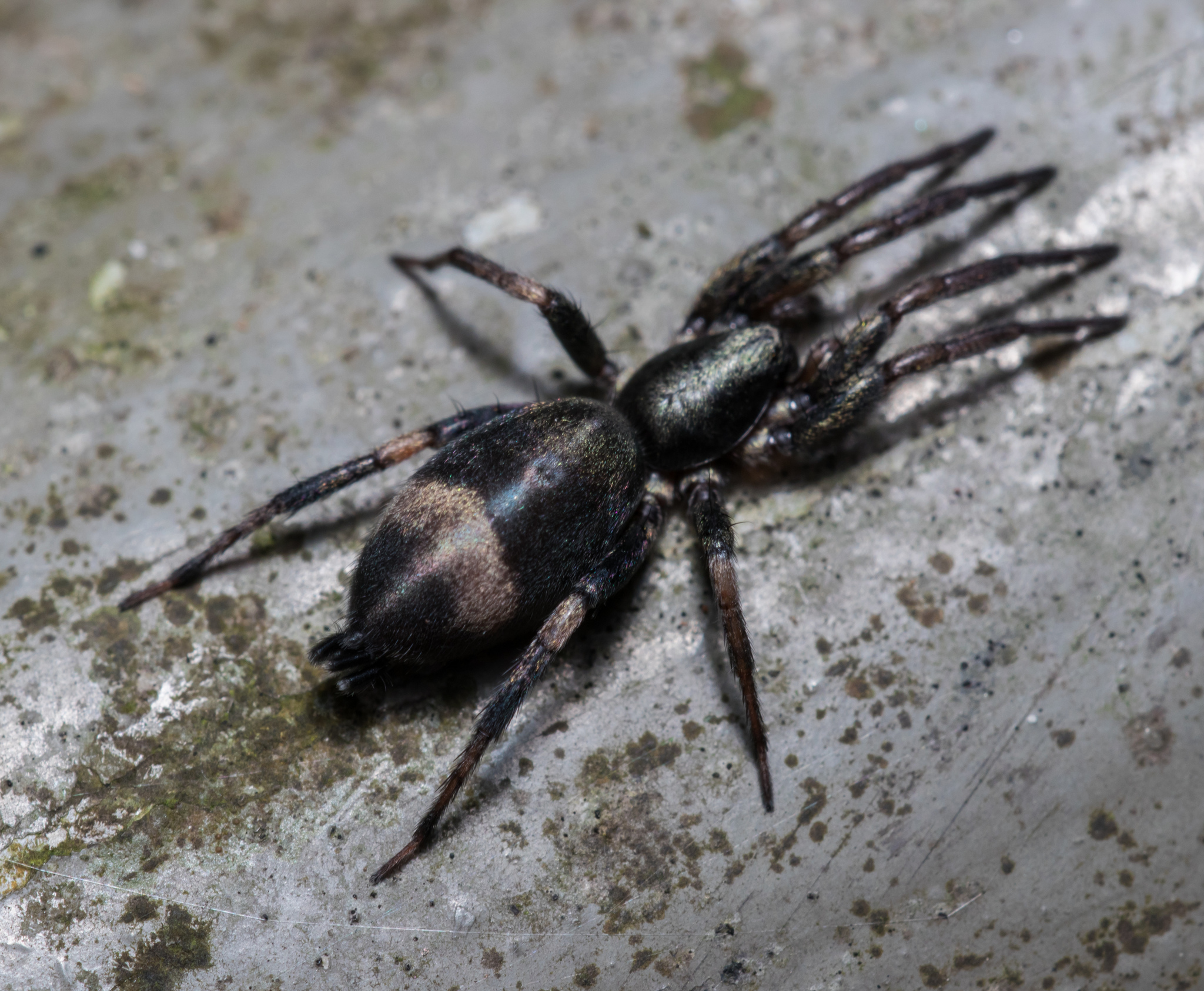

Scientific classification
- Kingdom: Animalia
- Phylum: Arthropoda
- Subphylum: Chelicerata
- Class: Arachnida
- Order: Araneae
- Infraorder: Araneomorphae
- Family: Gnaphosidae
- Genus: Sernokorba; Kamura, 1992

Type species
- S. pallidipatellis (Bösenberg & Strand, 1906)

= Sernokorba =

Genus of spiders

Sernokorba is a genus of ground spiders that was first described by T. Kamura in 1992. As of May 2019 it contains the following species:

- Sernokorba fanjing Song, Zhu & Zhang, 2004 – China
- Sernokorba pallidipatellis (Bösenberg & Strand, 1906) – Russia (Far East), China, Korea, Japan
- Sernokorba tescorum (Simon, 1914) – Bulgaria, France, Spain.
