= Coillina =

Scientific classification
- Domain: Eukaryota
- Kingdom: Animalia
- Phylum: Arthropoda
- Subphylum: Chelicerata
- Class: Arachnida
- Order: Araneae
- Infraorder: Araneomorphae
- Family: Gnaphosidae
- Genus: Coillina; Yin & Peng, 1998
- Species: C. baka

Binomial name
- Coillina baka Yin & Peng, 1998

Genus of spiders

Coillina is a monotypic genus of East Asian ground spiders containing the single species, Coillina baka. It was first described by C. M. Yin & X. J. Peng in 1998, and has only been found in China.
