= Echemoides =

Scientific classification
- Domain: Eukaryota
- Kingdom: Animalia
- Phylum: Arthropoda
- Subphylum: Chelicerata
- Class: Arachnida
- Order: Araneae
- Infraorder: Araneomorphae
- Family: Gnaphosidae
- Genus: Echemoides; Mello-Leitão, 1938

Type species
- E. giganteus Mello-Leitão, 1938

Species
- 15, see text

Synonyms
- Zodariops Mello-Leitão, 1939

Genus of spiders

Echemoides is a genus of South American ground spiders that was first described by Cândido Firmino de Mello-Leitão in 1938. Originally placed with the ant spiders, it was moved to the ground spiders in 1993.

== Species ==
As of May 2019 it contains fifteen species:

- Echemoides aguilari Platnick & Shadab, 1979 – Peru
- Echemoides argentinus (Mello-Leitão, 1940) – Argentina
- Echemoides balsa Platnick & Shadab, 1979 – Argentina
- Echemoides cekalovici Platnick, 1983 – Chile
- Echemoides chilensis Platnick, 1983 – Chile
- Echemoides gayi (Simon, 1904) – Chile
- Echemoides giganteus Mello-Leitão, 1938 (type) – Argentina
- Echemoides illapel Platnick & Shadab, 1979 – Chile
- Echemoides malleco Platnick & Shadab, 1979 – Chile
- Echemoides mauryi Platnick & Shadab, 1979 – Paraguay, Argentina
- Echemoides penai Platnick & Shadab, 1979 – Peru, Chile
- Echemoides penicillatus (Mello-Leitão, 1942) – Paraguay, Argentina
- Echemoides rossi Platnick & Shadab, 1979 – Chile
- Echemoides schlingeri Platnick & Shadab, 1979 – Chile
- Echemoides tofo Platnick & Shadab, 1979 – Chile
