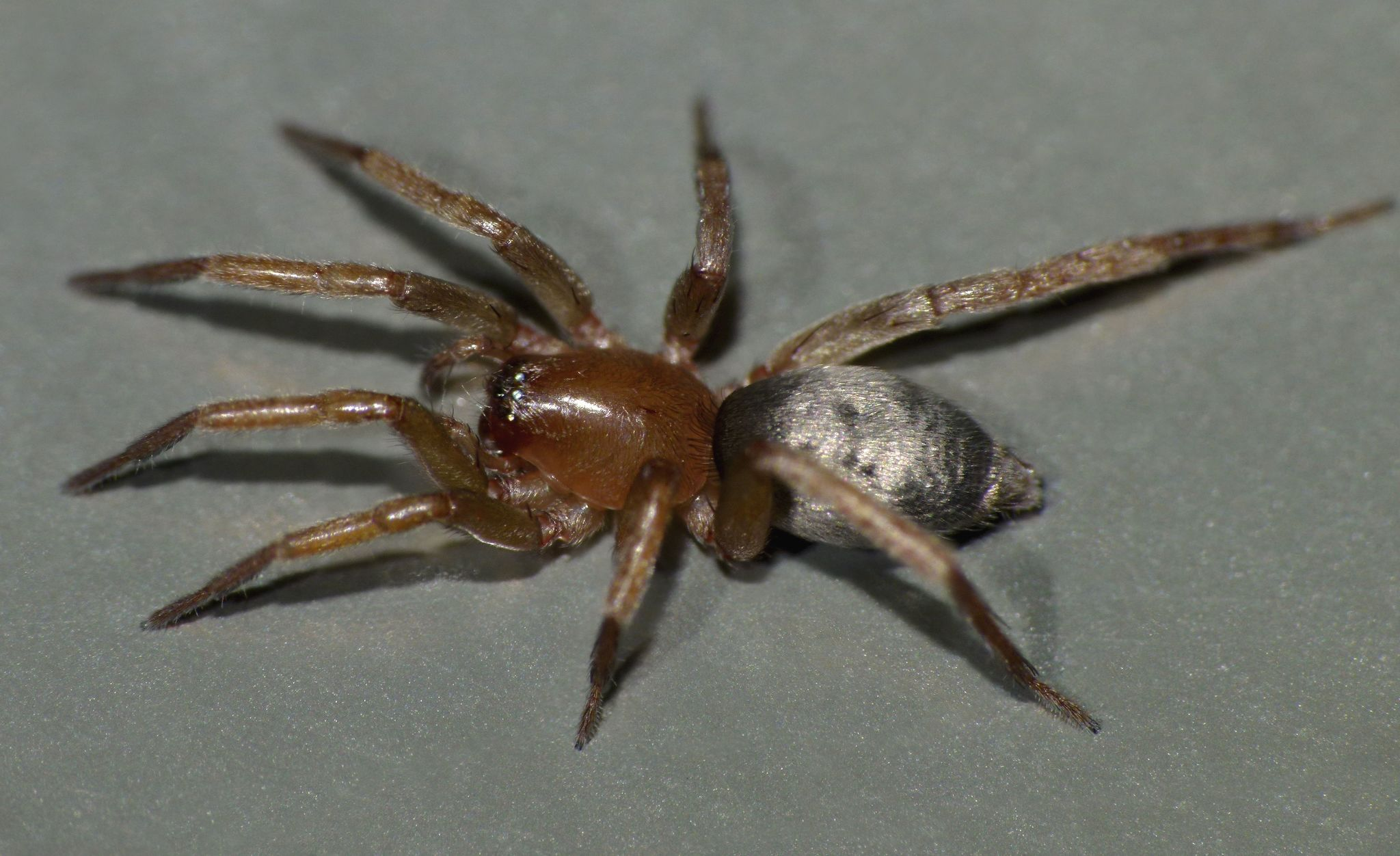
- Anzacia gemmea

Scientific classification
- Kingdom: Animalia
- Phylum: Arthropoda
- Subphylum: Chelicerata
- Class: Arachnida
- Order: Araneae
- Infraorder: Araneomorphae
- Family: Gnaphosidae
- Genus: Anzacia; Dalmas, 1919

Type species
- A. perexigua (Simon, 1880)

Species
- 15, see text

Synonyms
- Adelphodrassus Rainbow, 1920

= Anzacia =

Genus of spiders

Anzacia is a genus of South Pacific ground spiders that was first described by R. de Dalmas in 1919.

== Species ==
As of May 2019 it contains fifteen species:

- Anzacia daviesae Ovtsharenko & Platnick, 1995 – Australia (Queensland)
- Anzacia debilis (Hogg, 1900) – Australia (Victoria)
- Anzacia dimota (Simon, 1908) – Australia (Victoria)
- Anzacia gemmea (Dalmas, 1917) – New Zealand, Australia (Phillip Is.)
- Anzacia inornata (Rainbow, 1920) – Australia (Norfolk Is.)
- Anzacia invenusta (L. Koch, 1872) – Australia (New South Wales)
- Anzacia micacea (Simon, 1908) – Australia (Western Australia)
- Anzacia mustecula (Simon, 1908) – New Guinea, Australia (mainland, Cato Is., Lord Howe Is.)
- Anzacia perelegans (Rainbow, 1894) – Australia (New South Wales)
- Anzacia perexigua (Simon, 1880) (type) – New Caledonia
- Anzacia petila (Simon, 1908) – Australia (Western Australia)
- Anzacia respersa (Simon, 1908) – Australia (Western Australia)
- Anzacia sarrita (Simon, 1908) – Australian Capital Territory, Victoria, Tasmania
- Anzacia signata (Rainbow, 1920) – Australia (Norfolk Is.)
- Anzacia simoni Roewer, 1951 – Australia (Western Australia, Victoria)
