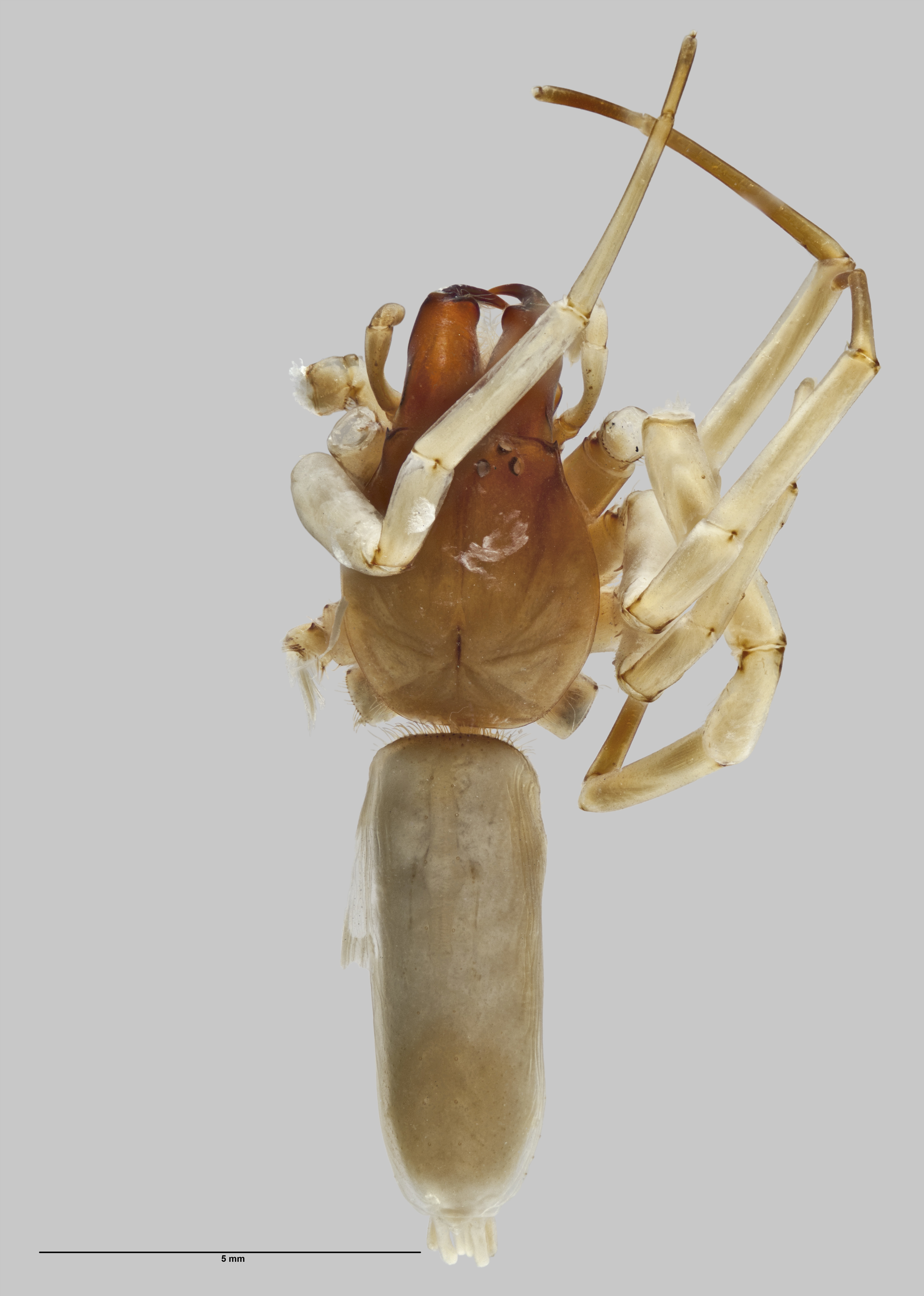
- Kaitawa insulare

Scientific classification
- Domain: Eukaryota
- Kingdom: Animalia
- Phylum: Arthropoda
- Subphylum: Chelicerata
- Class: Arachnida
- Order: Araneae
- Infraorder: Araneomorphae
- Family: Gnaphosidae
- Genus: Kaitawa; Forster, 1979
- Species: K. insulare

Binomial name
- Kaitawa insulare (Marples, 1956)

= Kaitawa =

Genus of spiders

Kaitawa is a monotypic genus of South Pacific ground spiders containing the single species, Kaitawa insulare. It was first described by Raymond Robert Forster in 1979, who separated Cheiracanthium insulare from Cheiracanthium into this genus, retaining the species name. It has only been found in New Zealand.
