= Zimiromus =

Scientific classification
- Domain: Eukaryota
- Kingdom: Animalia
- Phylum: Arthropoda
- Subphylum: Chelicerata
- Class: Arachnida
- Order: Araneae
- Infraorder: Araneomorphae
- Family: Gnaphosidae
- Genus: Zimiromus; Banks, 1914

Type species
- Zimiromus tropicalis (Banks, 1909)

Species
- 41, see text

Genus of spiders

Zimiromus is a genus of ground spiders that was first described by Nathan Banks in 1914.

== Species ==
As of May 2019 the genus Zimiromus contains 41 species:

- Zimiromus aduncus Platnick & Shadab, 1976 – Panama
- Zimiromus atrifus Platnick & Höfer, 1990 – Brazil
- Zimiromus beni Platnick & Shadab, 1981 – Bolivia, Brazil
- Zimiromus bimini Platnick & Shadab, 1976 – Bahama Islands
- Zimiromus boistus Platnick & Höfer, 1990 – Brazil
- Zimiromus brachet Platnick & Shadab, 1976 – Ecuador
- Zimiromus buzios Brescovit & Buckup, 1998 – Brazil
- Zimiromus canje Platnick & Shadab, 1979 – Guyana
- Zimiromus chickeringi Platnick & Shadab, 1976 – Panama
- Zimiromus circulus Platnick & Shadab, 1976 – Peru
- Zimiromus dorado Platnick & Shadab, 1979 – Peru
- Zimiromus eberhardi Platnick & Shadab, 1976 – Colombia
- Zimiromus exlineae Platnick & Shadab, 1976 – Ecuador
- Zimiromus hortenciae Buckup & Brescovit, 1993 – Brazil
- Zimiromus iotus (Banks, 1929) – Panama
- Zimiromus jamaicensis Platnick & Shadab, 1976 – Jamaica
- Zimiromus kleini Buckup & Brescovit, 1993 – Brazil
- Zimiromus kochalkai Platnick & Shadab, 1976 – Colombia
- Zimiromus lawa Platnick & Shadab, 1981 – Suriname
- Zimiromus lingua Platnick & Shadab, 1976 – Mexico
- Zimiromus lubricus (Simon, 1893) – Venezuela, Trinidad
- Zimiromus malkini Platnick & Shadab, 1976 – Nicaragua
- Zimiromus medius (Keyserling, 1891) – Brazil
- Zimiromus montenegro Buckup & Brescovit, 1993 – Brazil
- Zimiromus muchmorei Platnick & Shadab, 1976 – Virgin Islands
- Zimiromus nadleri Platnick & Shadab, 1979 – Suriname
- Zimiromus penai Platnick & Shadab, 1976 – Ecuador
- Zimiromus piura Platnick & Shadab, 1976 – Peru
- Zimiromus platnicki Brescovit & Höfer, 1994 – Bolivia
- Zimiromus rabago Platnick & Shadab, 1976 – Colombia
- Zimiromus racamus Buckup & Brescovit, 1993 – Brazil
- Zimiromus recs Zapata & Grismado, 2012 – Argentina
- Zimiromus reichardti Platnick & Shadab, 1976 – Brazil
- Zimiromus rothi Platnick & Shadab, 1981 – Mexico
- Zimiromus sinop Platnick & Shadab, 1981 – Brazil, Argentina
- Zimiromus sununga Buckup & Brescovit, 1993 – Brazil
- Zimiromus syenus Buckup & Brescovit, 1993 – Brazil
- Zimiromus tapirape Brescovit & Buckup, 1998 – Brazil
- Zimiromus tonina Platnick & Shadab, 1976 – Mexico
- Zimiromus tropicalis (Banks, 1909) (type) – Costa Rica, Panama
- Zimiromus volksberg Platnick & Shadab, 1981 – Suriname
