= Echemographis =

Scientific classification
- Domain: Eukaryota
- Kingdom: Animalia
- Phylum: Arthropoda
- Subphylum: Chelicerata
- Class: Arachnida
- Order: Araneae
- Infraorder: Araneomorphae
- Family: Gnaphosidae
- Genus: Echemographis
- Species: E. distincta

Binomial name
- Echemographis distincta Caporiacco, 1955

Genus of spiders

Echemographis is a genus of South American spiders in the family Gnaphosidae, and was first described in 1955 by Caporiacco. As of 2017, it contains only one species, Echemographis distincta, found in Venezuela. It is possibly a synonym of Camillina.
