= Arauchemus =

Scientific classification
- Kingdom: Animalia
- Phylum: Arthropoda
- Subphylum: Chelicerata
- Class: Arachnida
- Order: Araneae
- Infraorder: Araneomorphae
- Family: Gnaphosidae
- Genus: Arauchemus; Ott & Brescovit, 2012

Type species
- A. graudo Ott & Brescovit, 2012

Species
- A. graudo Ott & Brescovit, 2012 – Brazil; A. miudo Ott & Brescovit, 2012 – Brazil

Genus of spiders

Arauchemus is a genus of South American ground spiders that was first described by R. Ott & Antônio Brescovit in 2012. As of May 2019 it contains only two species, both found in Brazil: A. graudo and A. miudo.
