= Allomicythus =

Scientific classification
- Domain: Eukaryota
- Kingdom: Animalia
- Phylum: Arthropoda
- Subphylum: Chelicerata
- Class: Arachnida
- Order: Araneae
- Infraorder: Araneomorphae
- Family: Gnaphosidae
- Genus: Allomicythus; Ono, 2009
- Species: A. kamurai

Binomial name
- Allomicythus kamurai Ono, 2009

Genus of spiders

Allomicythus is a monotypic genus of Southeast Asian ground spiders containing the single species, Allomicythus kamurai. It was first described by H. Ono in 2009, and has only been found in Vietnam.
