= Talanitoides =

Scientific classification
- Kingdom: Animalia
- Phylum: Arthropoda
- Subphylum: Chelicerata
- Class: Arachnida
- Order: Araneae
- Infraorder: Araneomorphae
- Family: Gnaphosidae
- Genus: Talanitoides; Levy, 2009
- Species: T. habesor

Binomial name
- Talanitoides habesor Levy, 2009

Genus of spiders

Talanitoides is a monotypic genus of Asian ground spiders.

== History ==
Talanitoides habesor was first described by G. Levy in 2009. It has only been found in Israel.

== See also ==
- Wildlife of Israel
