= Meizhelan =

Scientific classification
- Kingdom: Animalia
- Phylum: Arthropoda
- Subphylum: Chelicerata
- Class: Arachnida
- Order: Araneae
- Infraorder: Araneomorphae
- Family: Gnaphosidae
- Genus: Meizhelan; Lin & Li, 2023
- Species: M. muhong

Binomial name
- Meizhelan muhong Lin & Li, 2023

Species of spider

Meizhelan is a monotypic genus of spiders in the family Gnaphosidae containing the single species, Meizhelan muhong. It is known from both genders.

== Distribution ==
Meizhelan muhong has been recorded from Yunnan province in China.

== Etymology ==
The genus is named Meizhelan (Chinese: 沒遮攔; pinyin: Méi zhēlán, "unrestrained"), after the nickname for Mu Hong (Chinese: 穆弘; pinyin: Mù Hóng), one of the 108 outlaws in the classical Chinese literature "Outlaws of the Marsh" (Chinese: 水滸傳; pinyin: Shuǐhǔ Zhuàn). The species is named after the same outlaw.
