= Microsa =

Scientific classification
- Kingdom: Animalia
- Phylum: Arthropoda
- Subphylum: Chelicerata
- Class: Arachnida
- Order: Araneae
- Infraorder: Araneomorphae
- Family: Gnaphosidae
- Genus: Microsa; Platnick & Shadab, 1977

Type species
- M. chickeringi Platnick & Shadab, 1977

Species
- M. chickeringi Platnick & Shadab, 1977 – Virgin Is.; M. cubitas Alayón & Platnick, 1993 – Cuba; M. gertschi Platnick, 1978 – Bahama Is.

Genus of spiders

Microsa is a genus of Caribbean ground spiders that was first described by Norman I. Platnick & M. U. Shadab in 1977. As of May 2019 it contains only three species: M. chickeringi, M. cubitas, and M. gertschi.
