= Marjanus =

Scientific classification
- Kingdom: Animalia
- Phylum: Arthropoda
- Subphylum: Chelicerata
- Class: Arachnida
- Order: Araneae
- Infraorder: Araneomorphae
- Family: Gnaphosidae
- Genus: Marjanus; Chatzaki, 2018

Species
- Marjanus platnicki (Zhang, Song & Zhu, 2001); Marjanus isfahanicus Zamani, Chatzaki, Esyunin & Marusik, 2021

Genus of spiders

Marjanus is a genus of ground spiders (family Gnaphosidae). As of July 2026, the World Spider Catalog accepted two species. The genus was first described by M. Chatzaki in 2018, and is found in Greece, Turkey, Iran and China.
