= Microdrassus =

Conservation status
- Critically Endangered (IUCN 3.1)

Scientific classification
- Kingdom: Animalia
- Phylum: Arthropoda
- Subphylum: Chelicerata
- Class: Arachnida
- Order: Araneae
- Infraorder: Araneomorphae
- Family: Gnaphosidae
- Genus: Microdrassus; Dalmas, 1919
- Species: M. inaudax

Binomial name
- Microdrassus inaudax (Simon, 1898)

Genus of spiders

Microdrassus is a monotypic genus of East African ground spiders containing the single species, Microdrassus inaudax. It was first described by R. de Dalmas in 1919, and has only been found in Seychelles.
