= Cubanopyllus =

Scientific classification
- Kingdom: Animalia
- Phylum: Arthropoda
- Subphylum: Chelicerata
- Class: Arachnida
- Order: Araneae
- Infraorder: Araneomorphae
- Family: Gnaphosidae
- Genus: Cubanopyllus; Alayón & Platnick, 1993
- Species: C. inconspicuus

Binomial name
- Cubanopyllus inconspicuus (Bryant, 1940)

Genus of spiders

Cubanopyllus is a monotypic genus of Caribbean ground spiders containing the single species, Cubanopyllus inconspicuus. It was first described by G. Alayón G. & Norman I. Platnick in 1993, and has only been found in Cuba.
