= Yuqilin =

Scientific classification
- Kingdom: Animalia
- Phylum: Arthropoda
- Subphylum: Chelicerata
- Class: Arachnida
- Order: Araneae
- Infraorder: Araneomorphae
- Family: Gnaphosidae
- Genus: Yuqilin; Lin & Li, 2023
- Species: Y. lujunyi

Binomial name
- Yuqilin lujunyi Lin & Li, 2023

Species of spider

Yuqilin is a monotypic genus of spiders in the family Gnaphosidae containing the single species, Yuqilin lujunyi.

== Distribution ==
Yuqilin lujunyi has been recorded from Yunnan province in China.

== Etymology ==
The genus is named after the nickname Yuqilin (Chinese: 玉麒麟; pinyin: Yù qílín, "Jade Qilin") for Lu Junyi (Chinese: 盧俊義; pinyin: Lú Jùnyì), one of the 108 outlaws in the classical Chinese literature "Outlaws of the Marsh" (Chinese: 水滸傳; pinyin: Shuǐhǔ Zhuàn). The species is named after the same outlaw.
