= Chatzakia =

Scientific classification
- Domain: Eukaryota
- Kingdom: Animalia
- Phylum: Arthropoda
- Subphylum: Chelicerata
- Class: Arachnida
- Order: Araneae
- Infraorder: Araneomorphae
- Family: Gnaphosidae
- Genus: Chatzakia
- Species: C. balearica

Binomial name
- Chatzakia balearica Lissner, 2016

Genus of spiders

Chatzakia is a genus of spiders in the family Gnaphosidae. It was first described in 2016 by Lissner & Bosmans. This genus was named in honour of the Greek arachnologist Maria Chatzaki. As of 2017, it contains only one species, Chatzakia balearica, found on the Balearic Islands.
