= Gertschosa =

Scientific classification
- Kingdom: Animalia
- Phylum: Arthropoda
- Subphylum: Chelicerata
- Class: Arachnida
- Order: Araneae
- Infraorder: Araneomorphae
- Family: Gnaphosidae
- Genus: Gertschosa; Platnick & Shadab, 1981

Type species
- G. concinna (Simon, 1895)

Species
- 4, see text

Genus of spiders

Gertschosa is a genus of ground spiders that was first described by Norman I. Platnick & M. U. Shadab in 1981.

== Species ==
As of May 2019 it contains four species:

- Gertschosa amphiloga (Chamberlin, 1936) – USA, Mexico
- Gertschosa cincta (Banks, 1929) – Panama
- Gertschosa concinna (Simon, 1895) (type) – Mexico
- Gertschosa palisadoes Platnick & Shadab, 1981 – Jamaica
