= Fedotovia =

Scientific classification
- Kingdom: Animalia
- Phylum: Arthropoda
- Subphylum: Chelicerata
- Class: Arachnida
- Order: Araneae
- Infraorder: Araneomorphae
- Family: Gnaphosidae
- Genus: Fedotovia; Charitonov, 1946

Type species
- F. uzbekistanica Charitonov, 1946

Species
- 4, see text

Genus of spiders

Fedotovia is a genus of Asian ground spiders that was first described by Dmitry Kharitonov in 1946.

== Species ==
As of May 2019 it contains four species:

- Fedotovia feti Fomichev & Marusik, 2015 – Mongolia
- Fedotovia mikhailovi Fomichev & Marusik, 2015 – Mongolia
- Fedotovia mongolica Marusik, 1993 – Mongolia
- Fedotovia uzbekistanica Charitonov, 1946 (type) – Central Asia, Iran, Afghanistan
