= Kishidaia =

Scientific classification
- Domain: Eukaryota
- Kingdom: Animalia
- Phylum: Arthropoda
- Subphylum: Chelicerata
- Class: Arachnida
- Order: Araneae
- Infraorder: Araneomorphae
- Family: Gnaphosidae
- Genus: Kishidaia; Yaginuma, 1960

Type species
- K. albimaculata (Saito, 1934)

Species
- K. albimaculata (Saito, 1934) – Russia (Far East), China, Japan; K. conspicua (L. Koch, 1866) – Europe, Caucasus, Russia (Europe to Far East), Central Asia, China; K. c. concolor (Caporiacco, 1951) – Italy; K. coreana (Paik, 1992) – Korea

Genus of spiders

Kishidaia is a genus of ground spiders that was first described by T. Yaginuma in 1960.As of May 2019 it contains three species and one subspecies: K. albimaculata, K. conspicua, K. c. concolor, and K. coreana.
