= Yoruba (spider) =

Scientific classification
- Kingdom: Animalia
- Phylum: Arthropoda
- Subphylum: Chelicerata
- Class: Arachnida
- Order: Araneae
- Infraorder: Araneomorphae
- Family: Gnaphosidae
- Genus: Yoruba; Rodrigues & Rheims, 2020

Type species
- Y. ibadanus Rodrigues & Rheims, 2020

Species
- Yoruba ibadanus Rodrigues & Rheims, 2020; Yoruba toubensis Rodrigues & Rheims, 2020

Genus of spiders

Yoruba is a small genus of western African ground spiders first described by B. V. B. Rodrigues and C. A. Rheims in 2020 and added to the subfamily Prodidominae. As of December 2021 it contains only two species: Y. ibadanus and Y. toubensis.
