= Kituba (spider) =

Scientific classification
- Kingdom: Animalia
- Phylum: Arthropoda
- Subphylum: Chelicerata
- Class: Arachnida
- Order: Araneae
- Infraorder: Araneomorphae
- Family: Gnaphosidae
- Genus: Kituba; Rodrigues & Rheims, 2020

Type species
- K. mayombensis Rodrigues & Rheims, 2020

Species
- Kituba langalanga Rodrigues & Rheims, 2020; Kituba mayombensis Rodrigues & Rheims, 2020

Genus of spiders

Kituba is a small genus of central African ground spiders. It was first described by B. V. B. Rodrigues and C. A. Rheims in 2020, and it has only been found in the Democratic Republic of the Congo. As of December 2021 it contains only two species: K. langalanga and K. mayombensis.
