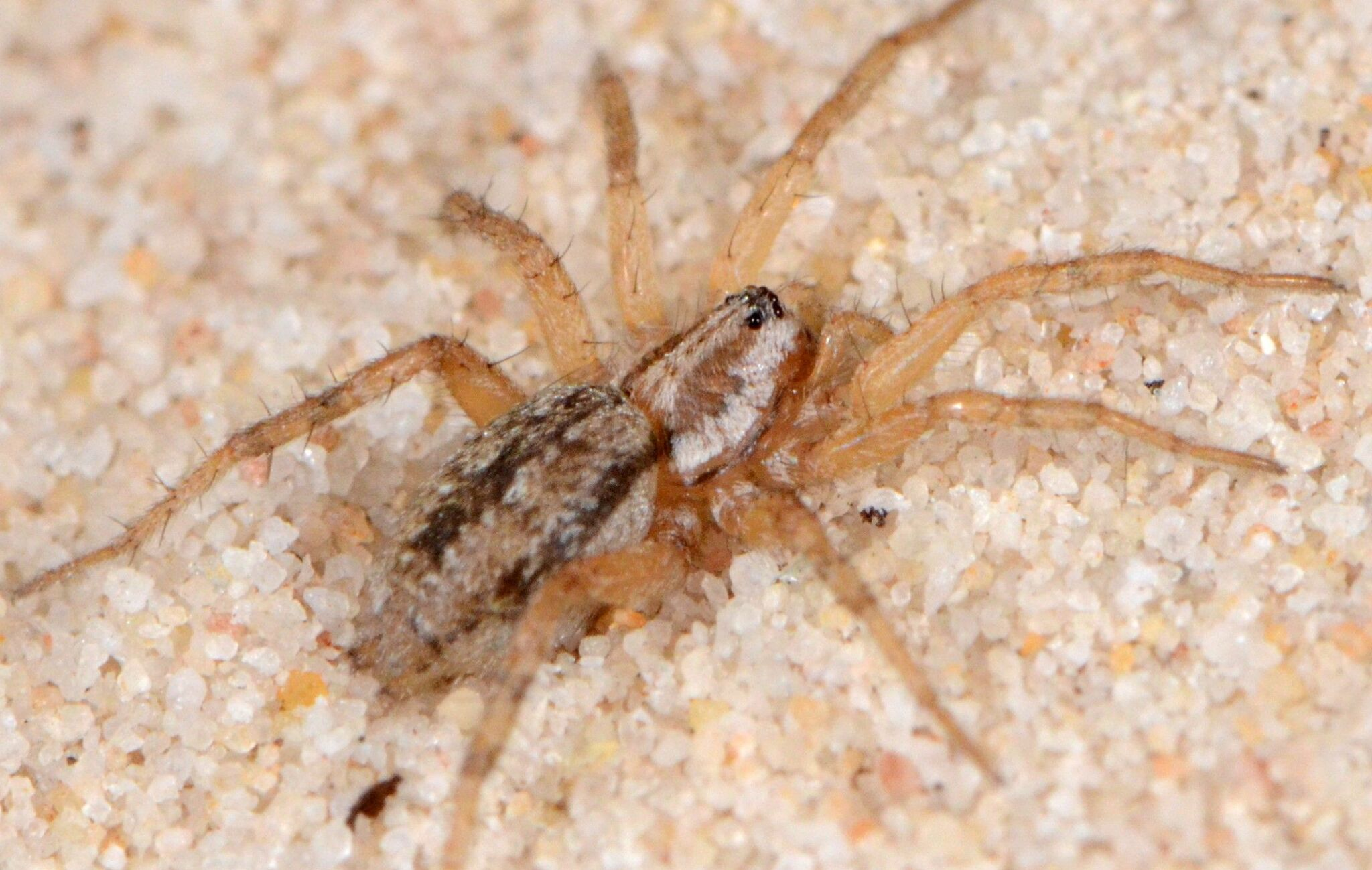
- Female
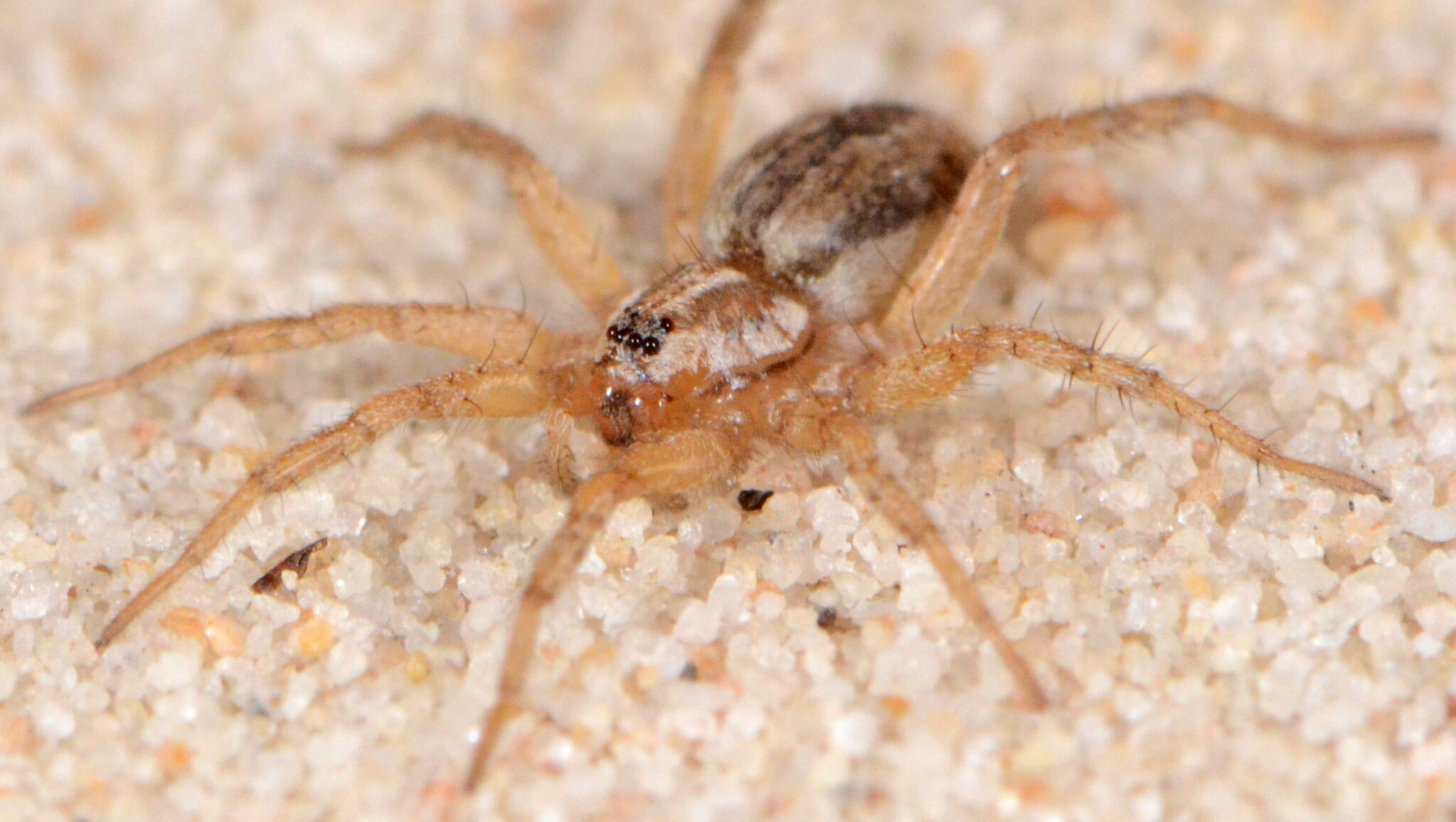
- Female

Scientific classification
- Kingdom: Animalia
- Phylum: Arthropoda
- Subphylum: Chelicerata
- Class: Arachnida
- Order: Araneae
- Infraorder: Araneomorphae
- Family: Gnaphosidae
- Genus: Asemesthes
- Species: A. pallidus

Binomial name
- Asemesthes pallidus Purcell, 1908

= Asemesthes pallidus =

Kamaggas Asemesthes Ground Spider

Species of spider

Asemesthes pallidus is a species of spider in the family Gnaphosidae. It is endemic to South Africa and is commonly known as the Kamaggas Asemesthes ground spider.

== Distribution ==
Asemesthes pallidus is recorded from three provinces in South Africa: Limpopo, Northern Cape, and North West, at altitudes ranging from 178 to 1,523 m above sea level.

== Habitat and ecology ==
The species is a free-living ground dweller sampled from the Savanna and Succulent biomes.

== Description ==
Asemesthes pallidus is known only from the female. The carapace is yellowish brown with black borders and irregular darkened lateral bands. The opisthosoma is dull testaceous with an irregular median dark band and serrated lateral darkening. The femora of the legs are only lightly darkened at the apex, with the first pair not distinctly banded, the bands being represented by faint darkened marks only. The total length is 6 mm.

== Conservation ==
Asemesthes pallidus is listed as Least Concern by the South African National Biodiversity Institute due to its wide range. The species is protected in three reserves: Blouberg Nature Reserve, Luvhondo Nature Reserve, and Namaqua National Park.

== Taxonomy ==
The species was originally described by W. F. Purcell in 1908 from Kamaggas in the Northern Cape. It has not been revised since its original description.
