= Asemesthes modestus =

Scientific classification
- Kingdom: Animalia
- Phylum: Arthropoda
- Subphylum: Chelicerata
- Class: Arachnida
- Order: Araneae
- Infraorder: Araneomorphae
- Family: Gnaphosidae
- Genus: Asemesthes
- Species: A. modestus

Binomial name
- Asemesthes modestus Dalmas, 1921

Species of spider

Asemesthes modestus is a species of spider in the family Gnaphosidae. It is endemic to South Africa.

== Distribution ==
Asemesthes modestus is known only from its type locality at Makapan in Limpopo province at an altitude of 1,417 m above sea level.

== Habitat and ecology ==
The species is a free-living ground dweller found in the Savanna biome.

== Description ==
Asemesthes modestus is known only from the male.

== Conservation ==
Asemesthes modestus is listed as Data Deficient due to taxonomic reasons, as too little is known about the location, habitat and threats to this taxon for an assessment to be made. Placement of the species is also problematic. More sampling is needed to collect the female and determine the species' range.

== Taxonomy ==
The species was originally described by R. de Dalmas in 1921 from Makapan in Limpopo. It has not been revised since its original description and no additional collecting has been undertaken.
