= Asemesthes decoratus =

Decorated Asemesthes Ground Spider

Conservation status
- Least Concern (SANBI Red List)

Scientific classification
- Kingdom: Animalia
- Phylum: Arthropoda
- Subphylum: Chelicerata
- Class: Arachnida
- Order: Araneae
- Infraorder: Araneomorphae
- Family: Gnaphosidae
- Genus: Asemesthes
- Species: A. decoratus

Binomial name
- Asemesthes decoratus Purcell, 1908

Species of spider

Asemesthes decoratus is a species of spider in the family Gnaphosidae. It is endemic to southern Africa and is commonly known as the decorated Asemesthes ground spider.

== Distribution ==
Asemesthes decoratus occurs in Namibia and South Africa. In South Africa, it is recorded from six provinces: Gauteng, KwaZulu-Natal, Limpopo, Mpumalanga, Northern Cape, and Western Cape, at altitudes ranging from 224 to 1,625 m above sea level.

== Habitat and ecology ==
The species is a free-living ground dweller that has been sampled from five biomes in South Africa. It has also been recorded from cotton fields in agricultural systems.

== Description ==
Asemesthes decoratus is known only from the female. The carapace is yellowish brown with black borders and irregular darkened lateral bands. The opisthosoma is dull testaceous with an irregular median dark band and serrated lateral darkening. The total length is 6 mm.

== Conservation ==
Asemesthes decoratus is listed as Least Concern by the South African National Biodiversity Institute due to its wide distribution. The species is protected in several reserves including Ophathe Game Reserve and Polokwane Nature Reserve.

== Taxonomy ==
The species was originally described by W. F. Purcell in 1908 from Kamaggas. It has not been revised since its original description.
