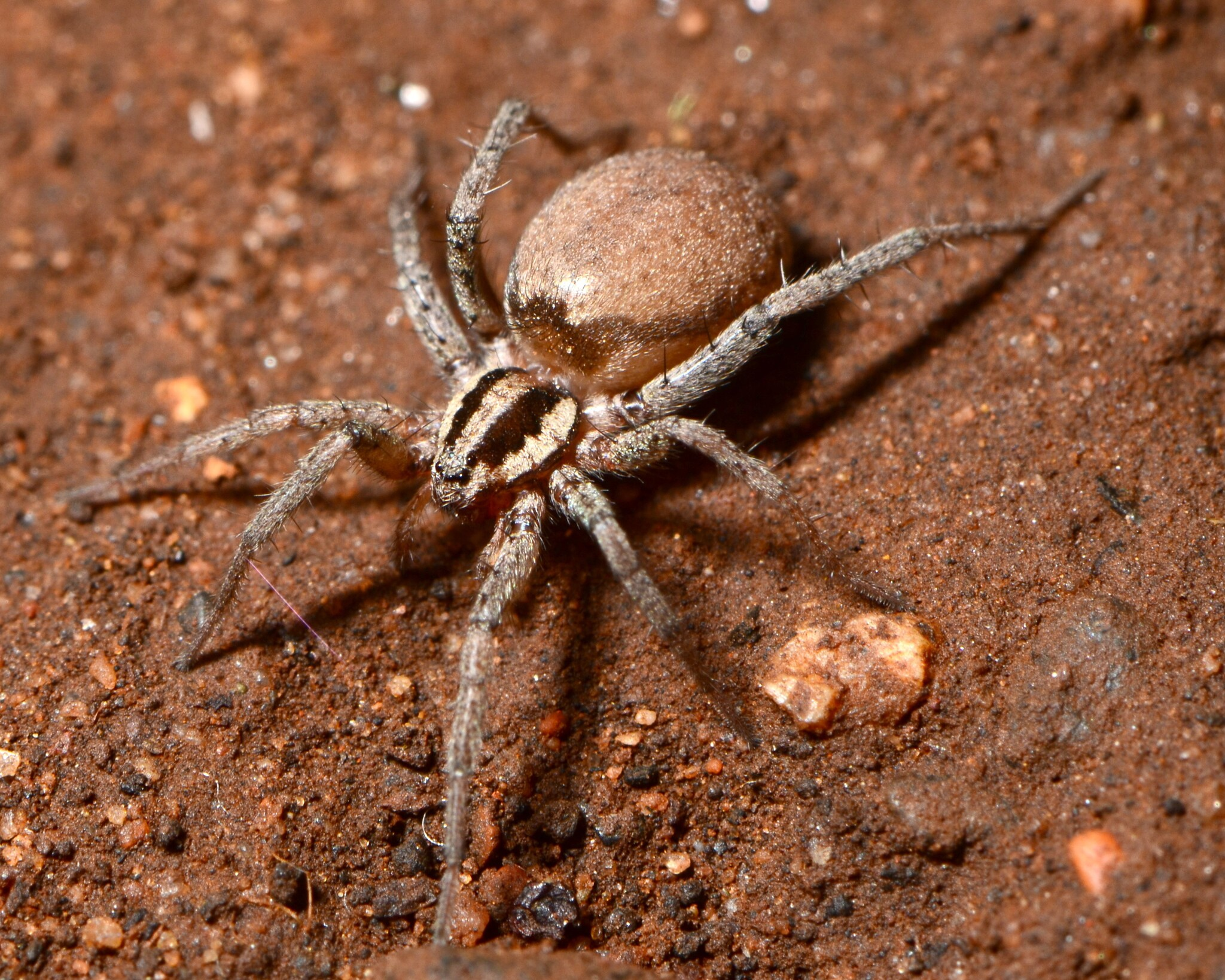
- A. flavipes from South Africa
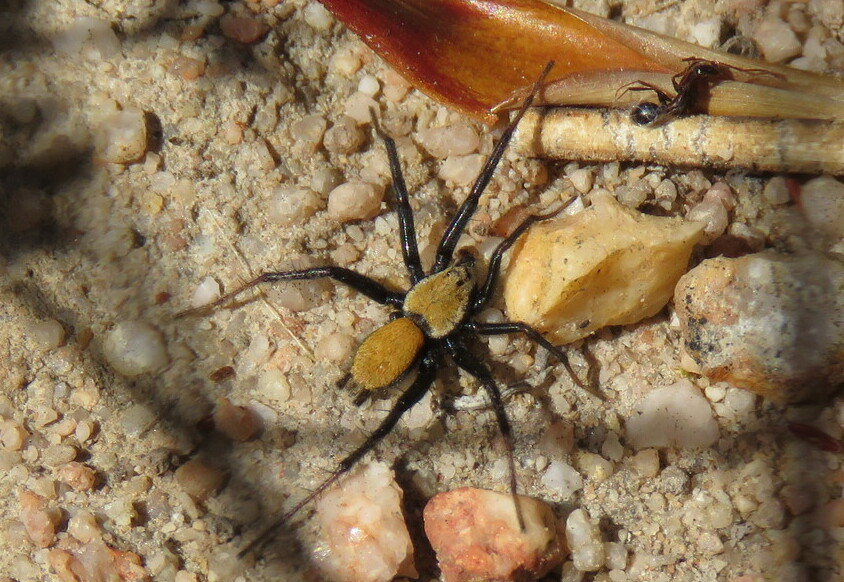
- A. subnubilus from South Africa

Scientific classification
- Kingdom: Animalia
- Phylum: Arthropoda
- Subphylum: Chelicerata
- Class: Arachnida
- Order: Araneae
- Infraorder: Araneomorphae
- Family: Gnaphosidae
- Genus: Asemesthes; Simon, 1887

Type species
- A. subnubilus Simon, 1887

Species
- 26, see text

= Asemesthes =

Genus of spiders

Asemesthes is a genus of African ground spiders that was first described by Eugène Simon in 1887.

== Species ==
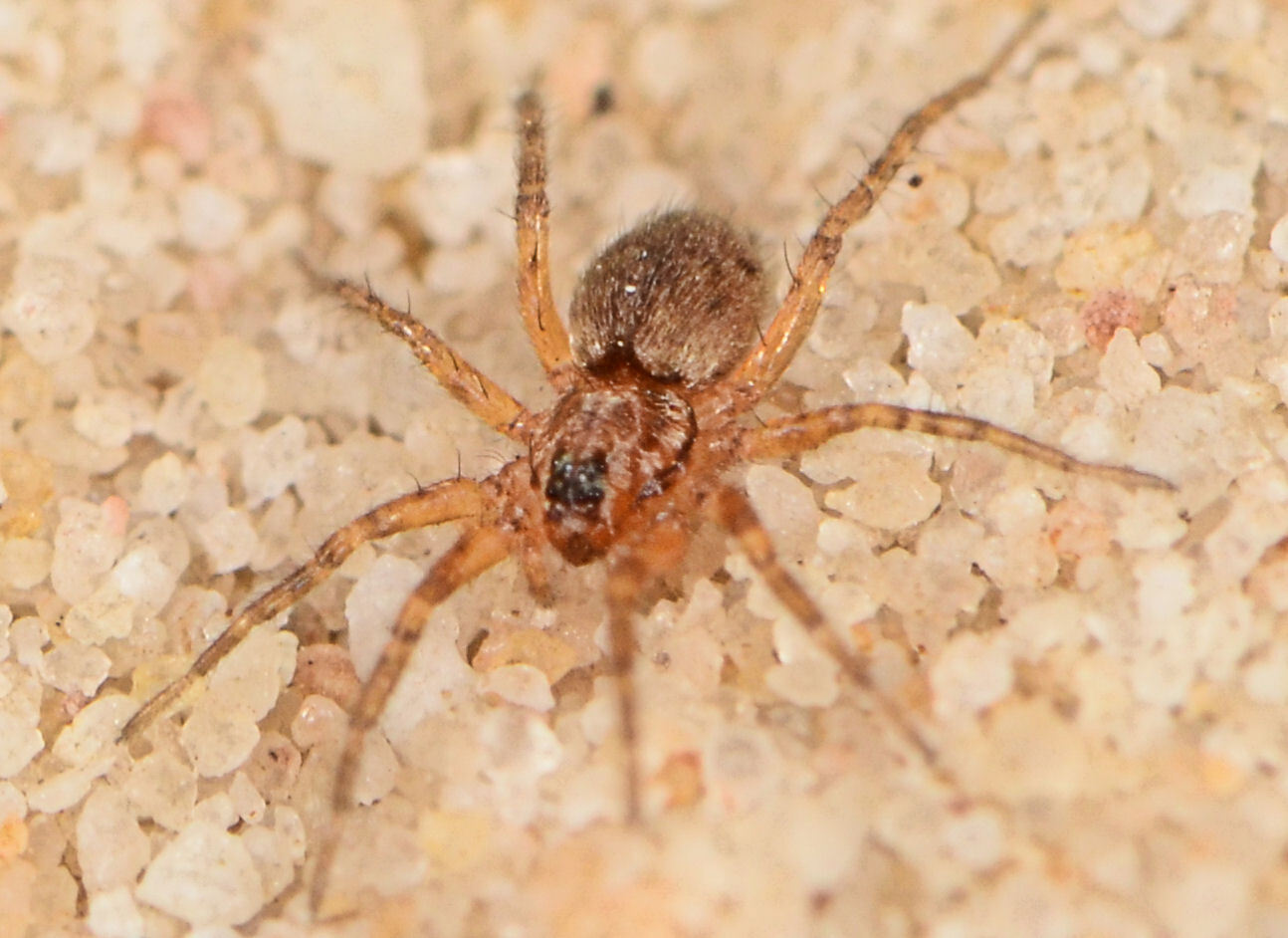
female A. ceresicola

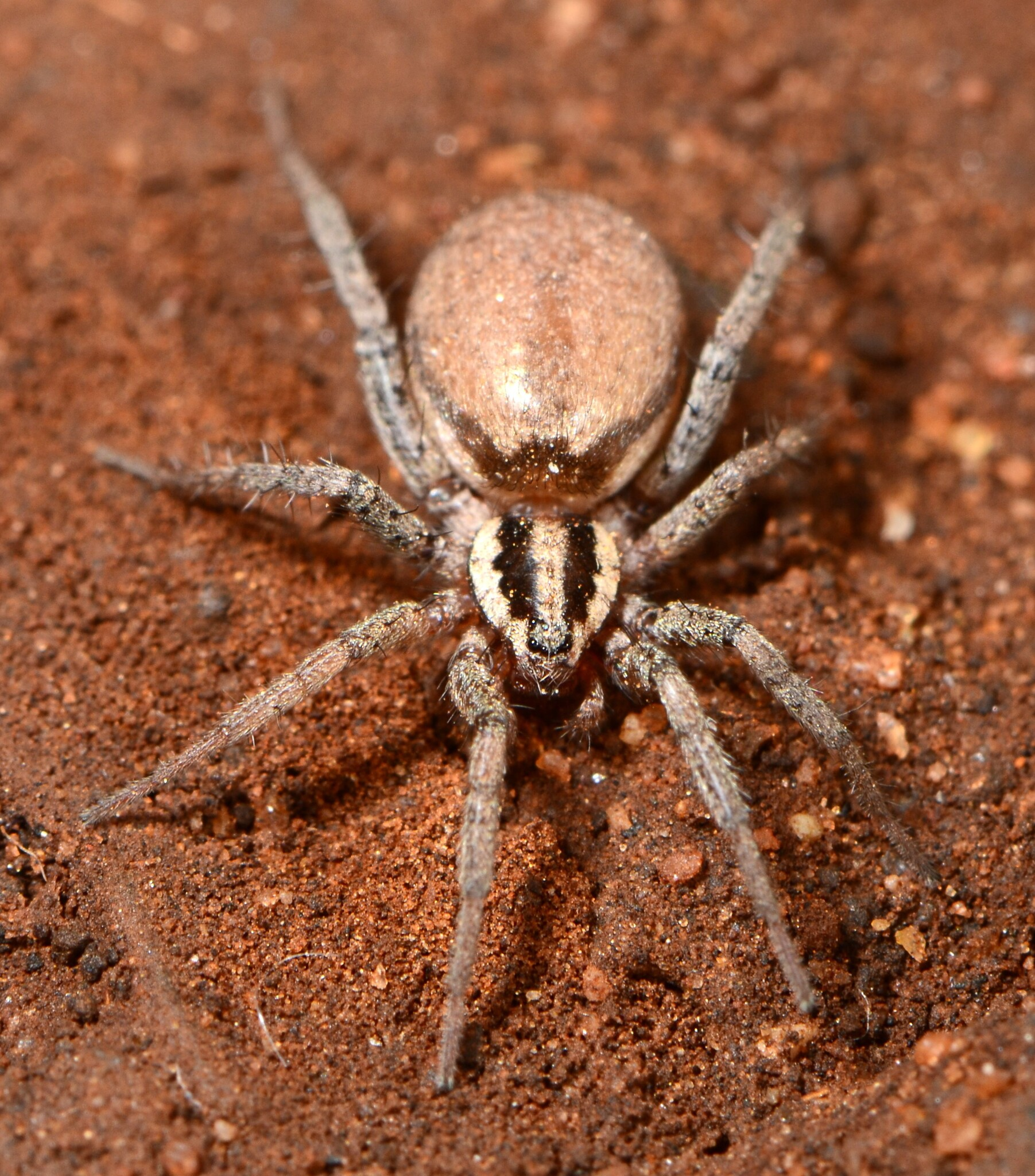
female A. flavipes

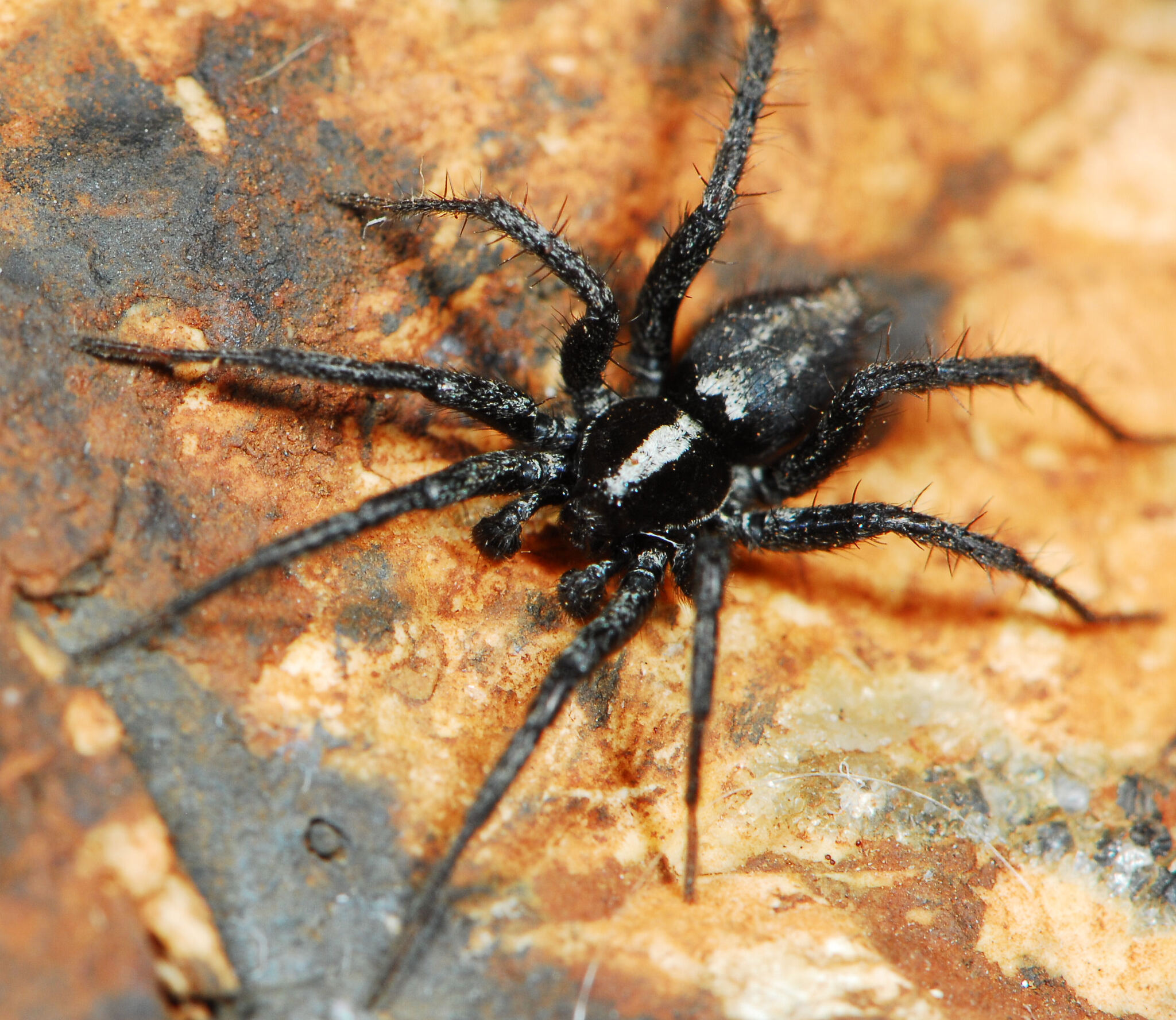
male A. oconnori

As of September 2025, this genus includes 26 species:

- Asemesthes affinis Lessert, 1933 – Angola
- Asemesthes albovittatus Purcell, 1908 – Namibia, South Africa
- Asemesthes ales Tucker, 1923 – South Africa
- Asemesthes alternatus Lawrence, 1928 – Namibia
- Asemesthes ceresicola Tucker, 1923 – South Africa
- Asemesthes decoratus Purcell, 1908 – Namibia, South Africa
- Asemesthes flavipes Purcell, 1908 – Namibia, South Africa
- Asemesthes fodina Tucker, 1923 – Namibia, South Africa
- Asemesthes hertigi Lessert, 1933 – Angola
- Asemesthes kunenensis Lawrence, 1927 – Namibia
- Asemesthes lamberti Tucker, 1923 – South Africa
- Asemesthes lineatus Purcell, 1908 – Zambia, Namibia, Botswana, South Africa
- Asemesthes modestus Dalmas, 1921 – South Africa
- Asemesthes montanus Tucker, 1923 – Namibia, South Africa
- Asemesthes nigristernus Dalmas, 1921 – South Africa
- Asemesthes numisma Tucker, 1923 – Namibia, South Africa
- Asemesthes oconnori Tucker, 1923 – South Africa
- Asemesthes pallidus Purcell, 1908 – South Africa
- Asemesthes paynteri Tucker, 1923 – South Africa
- Asemesthes perdignus Dalmas, 1921 – Namibia
- Asemesthes purcelli Tucker, 1923 – Namibia, South Africa
- Asemesthes reflexus Tucker, 1923 – South Africa
- Asemesthes septentrionalis Caporiacco, 1940 – Ethiopia
- Asemesthes sinister Lawrence, 1927 – Namibia
- Asemesthes subnubilus Simon, 1887 – Namibia, South Africa (type species)
- Asemesthes windhukensis Tucker, 1923 – Namibia
