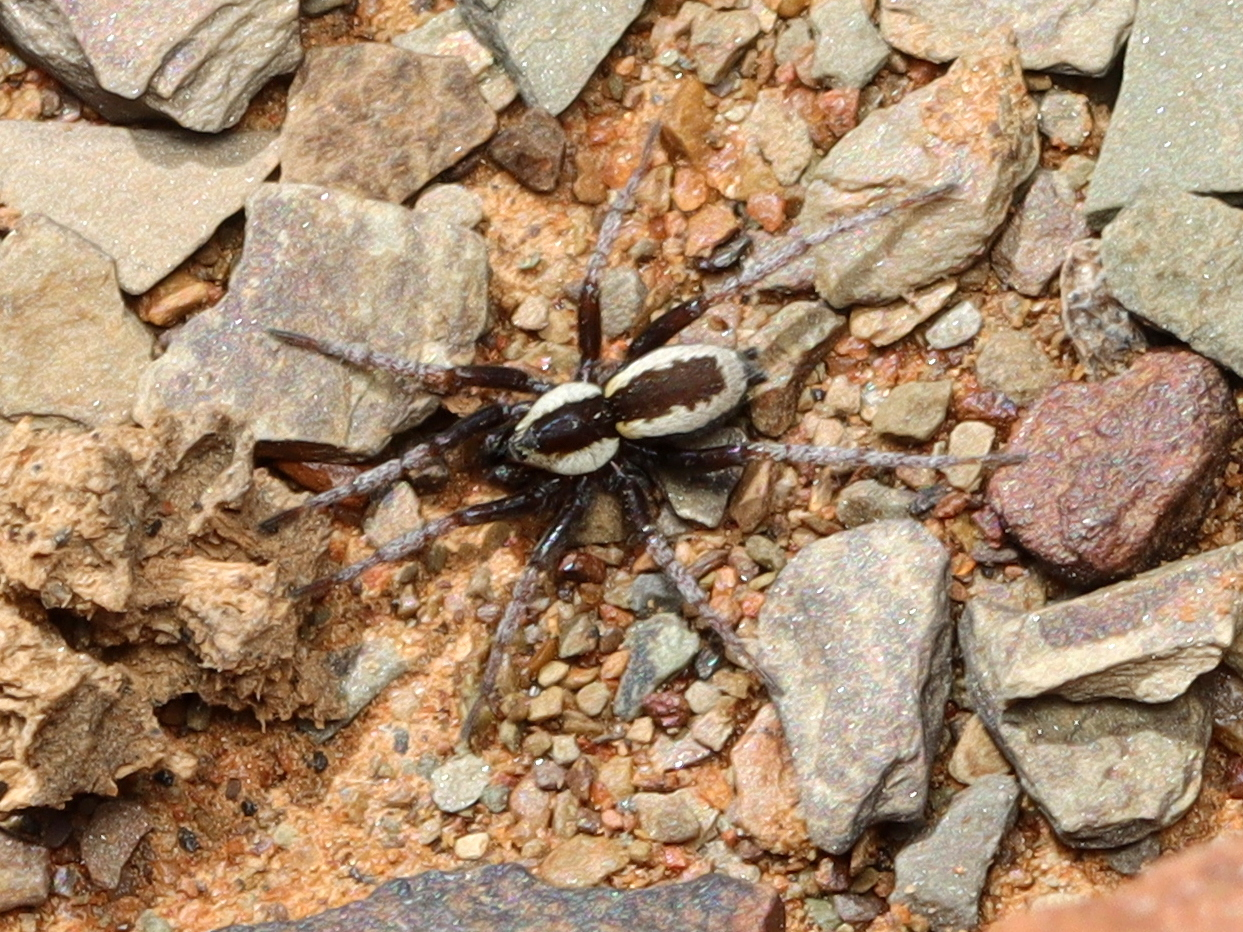

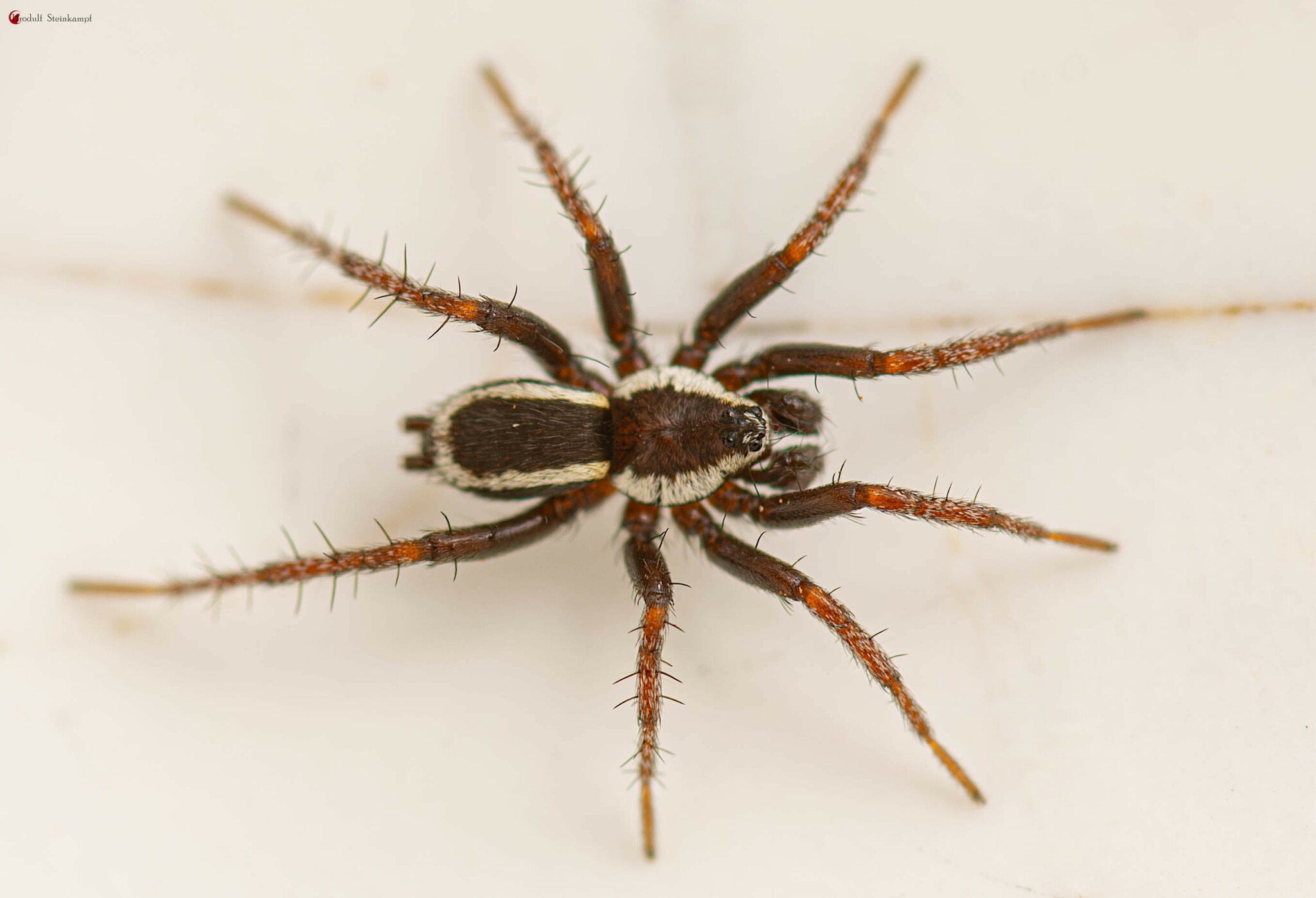
- male

Scientific classification
- Kingdom: Animalia
- Phylum: Arthropoda
- Subphylum: Chelicerata
- Class: Arachnida
- Order: Araneae
- Infraorder: Araneomorphae
- Family: Gnaphosidae
- Genus: Asemesthes
- Species: A. albovittatus

Binomial name
- Asemesthes albovittatus Purcell, 1908

= Asemesthes albovittatus =

Wolf-Like Flatbellied Ground Spider

Species of spider

Asemesthes albovittatus is a species of spider in the family Gnaphosidae. It is endemic to southern Africa and is commonly known as the wolf-like flatbellied ground spider.

== Distribution ==
Asemesthes albovittatus occurs in Namibia and South Africa. In South Africa, the species is recorded from four provinces, Eastern Cape, Northern Cape, and Western Cape. Notable locations include Mountain Zebra National Park and Anysberg Nature Reserve.

== Habitat and ecology ==
The species is a free-living ground dweller found at altitudes ranging from 613 to 1,513 metres above sea level. It inhabits the Fynbos, Grassland, and Thicket biomes.

== Description ==
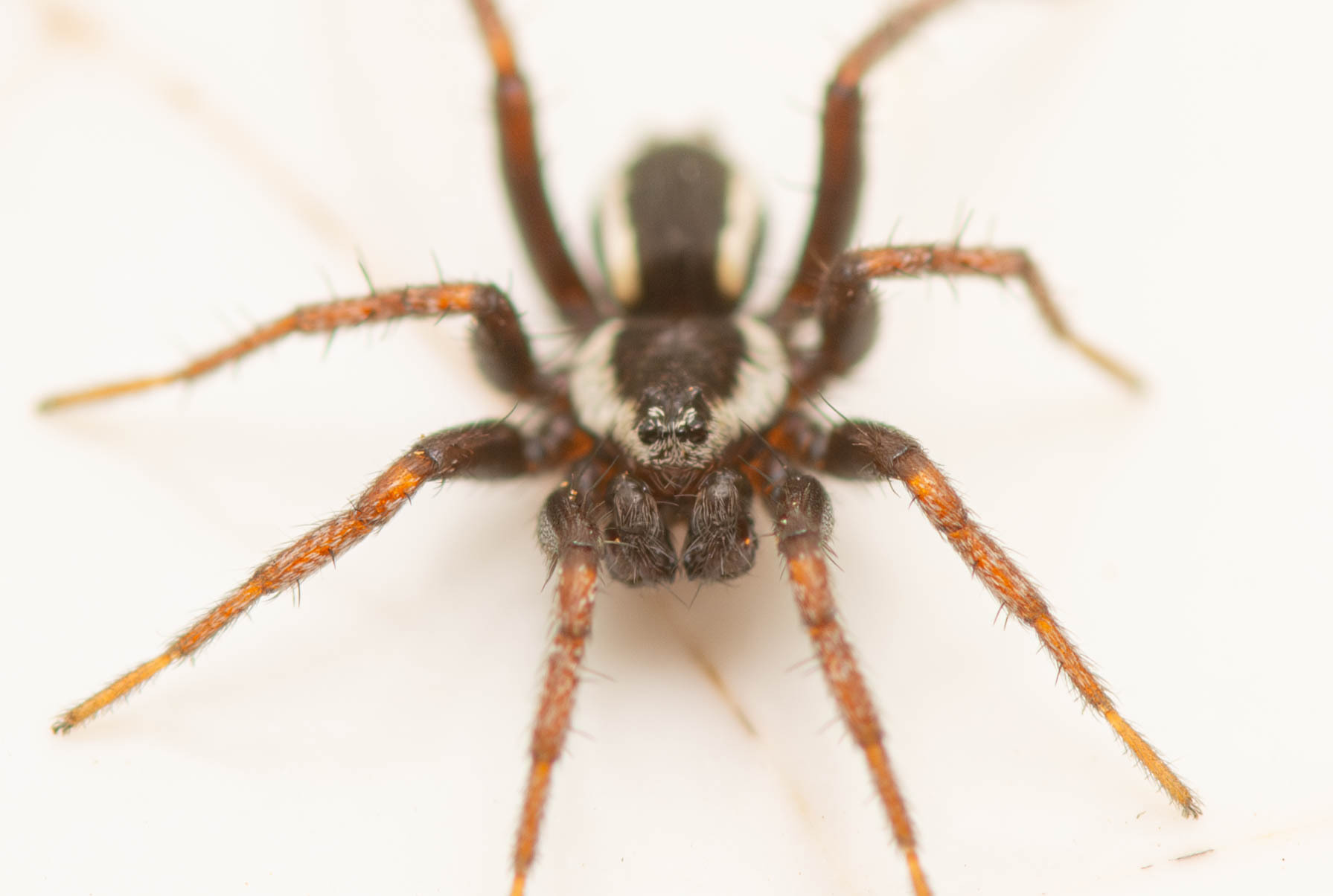
male

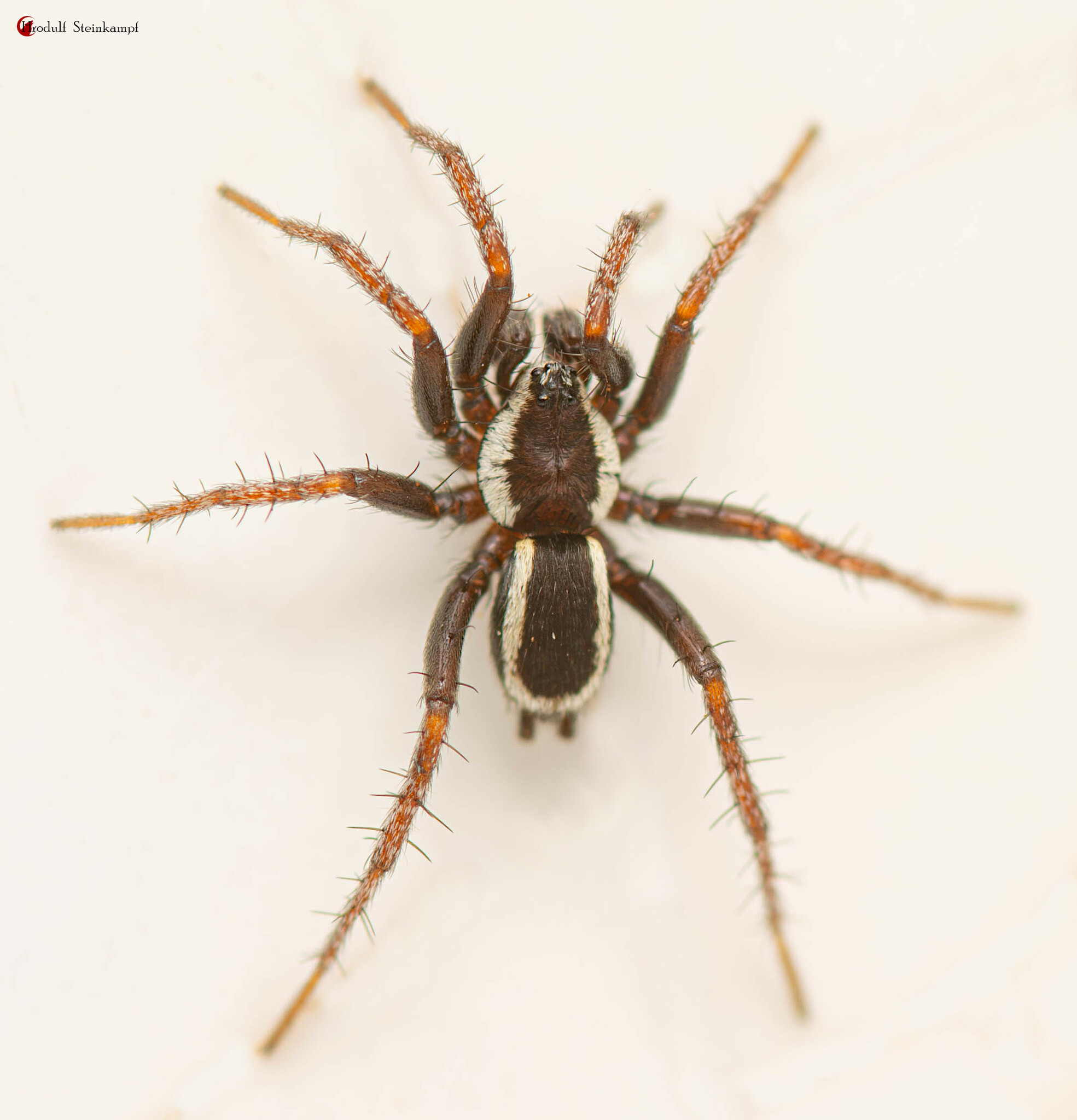
male

Asemesthes albovittatus is known from both sexes and belongs to a genus that resembles wolf spiders in appearance. Females have a yellowish brown carapace and legs, with a testaceous opisthosoma that is darkened laterally and mid-dorsally, leaving a characteristic U-shaped band of white hair on the dorsal surface. The carapace bears lateral bands of white hairs. The total length ranges from 3 to 4 mm.

== Conservation ==
Asemesthes albovittatus is listed as Least Concern by the South African National Biodiversity Institute due to its wide distribution range. The species is protected in Anysberg Nature Reserve and Mountain Zebra National Park. There are no significant threats to the species and no conservation actions are recommended.

== Taxonomy ==
The species was originally described by W. F. Purcell in 1908 from Namibia. The genus Asemesthes was last revised by Tucker in 1923 and belongs to the subfamily Gnaphosinae.
