= Asemesthes montanus =

Fynbos Asemesthes Ground Spider

Conservation status
- Least Concern (SANBI Red List)

Scientific classification
- Kingdom: Animalia
- Phylum: Arthropoda
- Subphylum: Chelicerata
- Class: Arachnida
- Order: Araneae
- Infraorder: Araneomorphae
- Family: Gnaphosidae
- Genus: Asemesthes
- Species: A. montanus

Binomial name
- Asemesthes montanus Tucker, 1923

Species of spider

Asemesthes montanus is a species of spider in the family Gnaphosidae. It occurs in southern Africa and is commonly known as the fynbos Asemesthes ground spider.

== Distribution ==
Asemesthes montanus occurs in Namibia and South Africa. In South Africa, it is recorded from three provinces: Free State, Northern Cape, and Western Cape, at altitudes ranging from 78 to 1,850 m above sea level.

== Habitat and ecology ==
The species is a free-living ground dweller sampled from the Fynbos, Grassland, and Nama Karoo biomes.

== Description ==
Asemesthes montanus is known from both sexes. In some specimens, the posterior portion of the median abdominal band is bordered with light spots and the testaceous background is more tawny. The sternum is uniform black-brown in colour. The coxae, especially the anterior pairs, are darkened, and the femora (except the fourth legs) are darkened. The total length ranges from 5 to 8 mm.

== Conservation ==
Asemesthes montanus is listed as Least Concern by the South African National Biodiversity Institute due to its wide distribution range. The species is protected in several areas including the Cederberg Wilderness Area, Table Mountain National Park, Rooipoort Nature Reserve, and Benfontein Game Reserve.

== Taxonomy ==
The species was originally described by Richard William Ethelbert Tucker in 1923 from Waterfall Mountains at Tulbagh Road. It has not been revised since its original description.
