= Asemesthes reflexus =

Beaufort West Asemesthes Ground Spider

Conservation status
- Least Concern (SANBI Red List)

Scientific classification
- Kingdom: Animalia
- Phylum: Arthropoda
- Subphylum: Chelicerata
- Class: Arachnida
- Order: Araneae
- Infraorder: Araneomorphae
- Family: Gnaphosidae
- Genus: Asemesthes
- Species: A. reflexus

Binomial name
- Asemesthes reflexus Tucker, 1923

Species of spider

Asemesthes reflexus is a species of spider in the family Gnaphosidae. It is endemic to South Africa and is commonly known as the Beaufort West Asemesthes ground spider.

== Distribution ==
Asemesthes reflexus is recorded from three provinces in South Africa, Eastern Cape, Free State, Limpopo, Mpumalanga, and Western Cape, at altitudes ranging from 78 to 1,341 m above sea level.

== Habitat and ecology ==
The species is a free-living ground dweller sampled from the Fynbos, Savanna, Succulent Karoo, and Thicket biomes.

== Description ==
Asemesthes reflexus is known from both sexes. The carapace is dark brown, clothed with scanty pale pubescence. The legs are similar in colour to the carapace. The opisthosoma is dull brownish in colour and also clothed with pale pubescence. The sternum is dark brown. The total length is 5.75 mm for females and 5 mm for males.

== Conservation ==
Asemesthes reflexus is listed as Least Concern by the South African National Biodiversity Institute due to its wide distribution range. The species is protected in several areas including Blouberg Nature Reserve, Luvhondo Nature Reserve, Kruger National Park, and Karoo National Park.

== Taxonomy ==
The species was originally described by Richard William Ethelbert Tucker in 1923 from Beaufort West in the Western Cape. It has not been revised since its original description.
