= Asemesthes ales =

Scientific classification
- Kingdom: Animalia
- Phylum: Arthropoda
- Subphylum: Chelicerata
- Class: Arachnida
- Order: Araneae
- Infraorder: Araneomorphae
- Family: Gnaphosidae
- Genus: Asemesthes
- Species: A. ales

Binomial name
- Asemesthes ales Tucker, 1923

Species of spider

Asemesthes ales is a species of spider in the family Gnaphosidae. It is endemic to South Africa.

== Distribution ==
Asemesthes ales is known only from its type locality in Grahamstown in the Eastern Cape.

== Habitat and ecology ==
The species is a free-living ground dweller found at approximately 552 m above sea level in the Thicket biome.

== Description ==
Asemesthes ales is known only from the female. The carapace is dark brown with dark edges and slightly more darkened laterally, sparsely clothed with light appressed hairs. The legs are slightly lighter and paler distally. The opisthosoma is dull greyish brown dorsally and bears no distinct pattern. The total length is 6.4 mm.

== Conservation ==
Asemesthes ales is listed as Data Deficient due to taxonomic reasons, as identification of the species remains problematic. More sampling is needed to collect the male and determine the species' geographical range.

== Taxonomy ==
The species was originally described by Richard William Ethelbert Tucker in 1923 from Grahamstown. It has not been revised since its original description.
