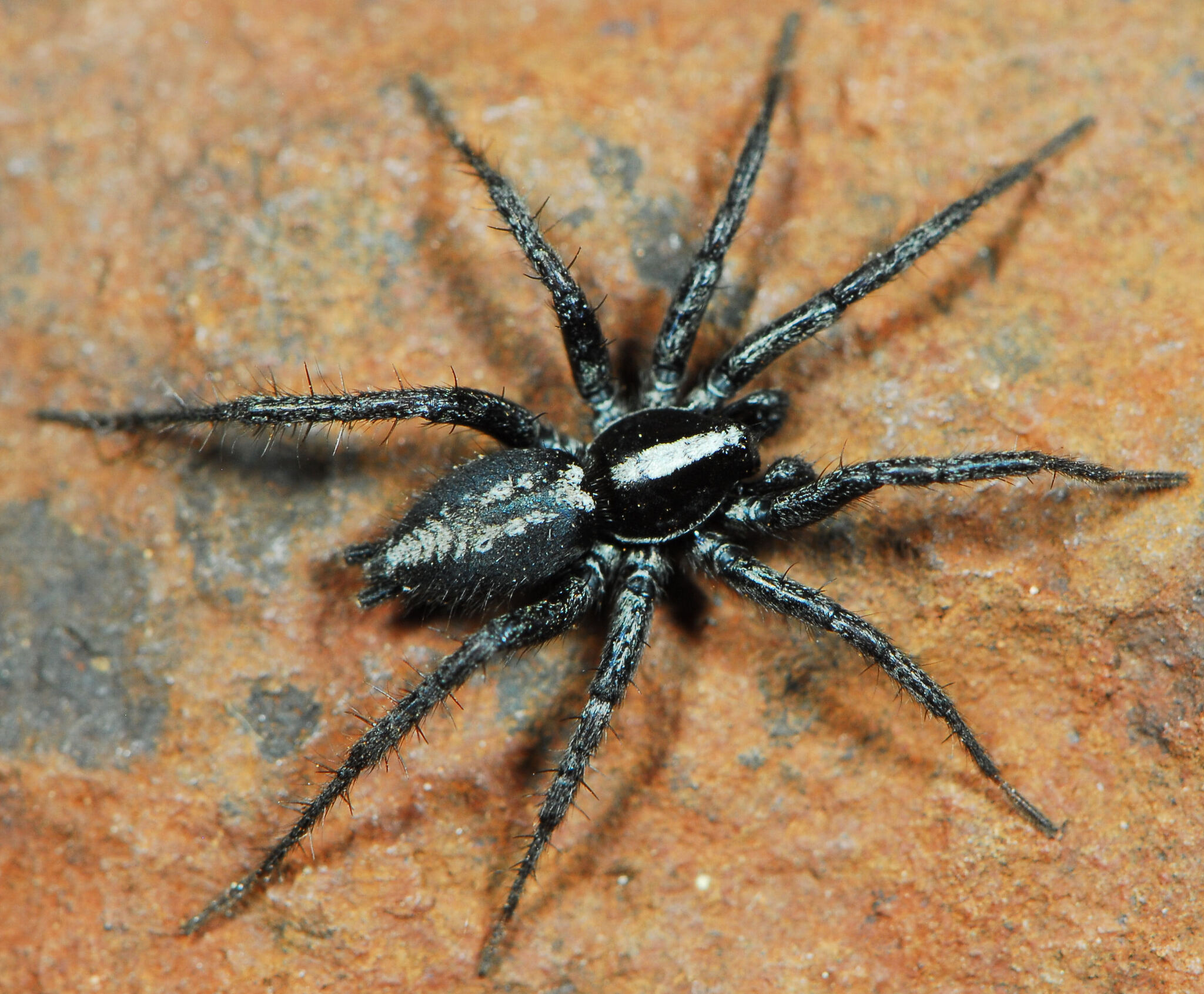
- Male from Lephalale, South Africa
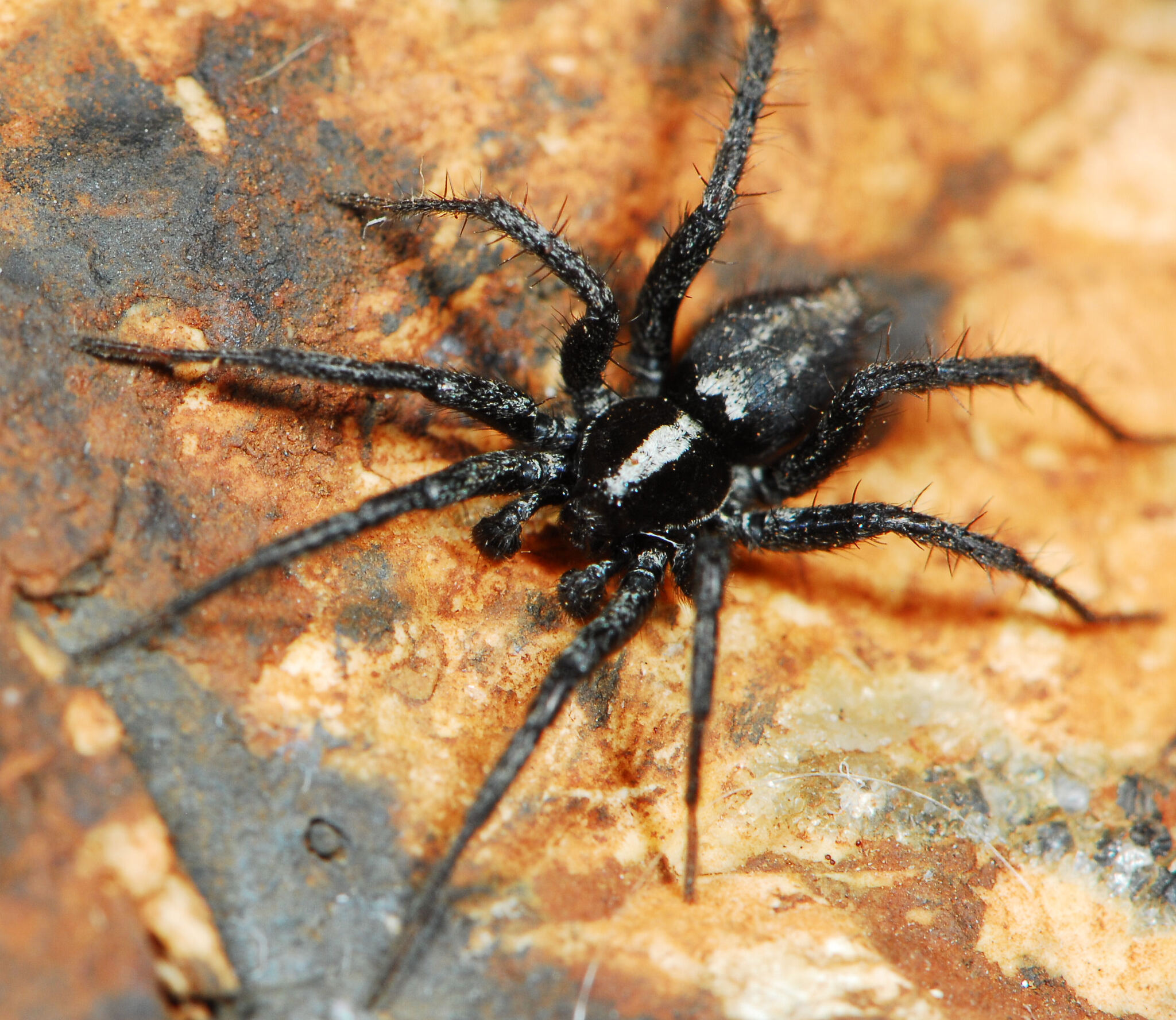

Scientific classification
- Kingdom: Animalia
- Phylum: Arthropoda
- Subphylum: Chelicerata
- Class: Arachnida
- Order: Araneae
- Infraorder: Araneomorphae
- Family: Gnaphosidae
- Genus: Asemesthes
- Species: A. oconnori

Binomial name
- Asemesthes oconnori Tucker, 1923

= Asemesthes oconnori =

O'Connor's Asemesthes Ground Spider

Species of spider

Asemesthes oconnori is a species of spider in the family Gnaphosidae. It is endemic to South Africa and is commonly known as O'Connor's Asemesthes ground spider.

== Distribution ==
Asemesthes oconnori is recorded from four provinces in South Africa, Free State, Limpopo, Northern Cape, and Western Cape, at altitudes ranging from 167 to 1,850 m above sea level.

== Habitat and ecology ==
The species is a free-living ground dweller sampled from the Fynbos, Grassland, and Savanna biomes.

== Description ==
Asemesthes oconnori is known only from the male. The carapace is very dark brown, darkened laterally, with a broad band of pale hairs down the centre and a narrow border of pale hairs laterally. The opisthosoma is greyish black dorsally with a feather-like band of white hairs down the centre. The legs are lighter than the carapace, except the anterior femora, which are similar in colour.

== Conservation ==
Asemesthes oconnori is listed as Least Concern by the South African National Biodiversity Institute due to its wide range. Although the female has not yet been described, the male is distinct enough to allow identification. The species is protected in several areas including Amanzi Private Game Reserve, Benfontein Game Reserve, Lekgalameetsi Nature Reserve, and Cederberg Wilderness Area.

== Taxonomy ==
The species was originally described by Richard William Ethelbert Tucker in 1923 from Ashton in the Western Cape. It has not been revised since its original description.
