= Asemesthes nigristernus =

Scientific classification
- Kingdom: Animalia
- Phylum: Arthropoda
- Subphylum: Chelicerata
- Class: Arachnida
- Order: Araneae
- Infraorder: Araneomorphae
- Family: Gnaphosidae
- Genus: Asemesthes
- Species: A. nigristernus

Binomial name
- Asemesthes nigristernus Dalmas, 1921

Species of spider

Asemesthes nigristernus is a species of spider in the family Gnaphosidae.

== Distribution ==
Asemesthes nigristernus is known only from its type locality given as "Cap de Bonne Esperance" (Cape of Good Hope).

== Habitat and ecology ==
The species is a free-living ground dweller, but specific habitat information is not available.

== Description ==
Asemesthes nigristernus is known only from the female.

== Conservation ==
Asemesthes nigristernus is listed as Data Deficient due to taxonomic reasons, as too little is known about the location, habitat and threats to this taxon for an assessment to be made. Placement of the species is also problematic. Study of type material and redescription are needed.

== Taxonomy ==
The species was originally described by R. de Dalmas in 1921 with the type locality only given as "Cap de Bonne Esperance". It has not been revised since its original description.
