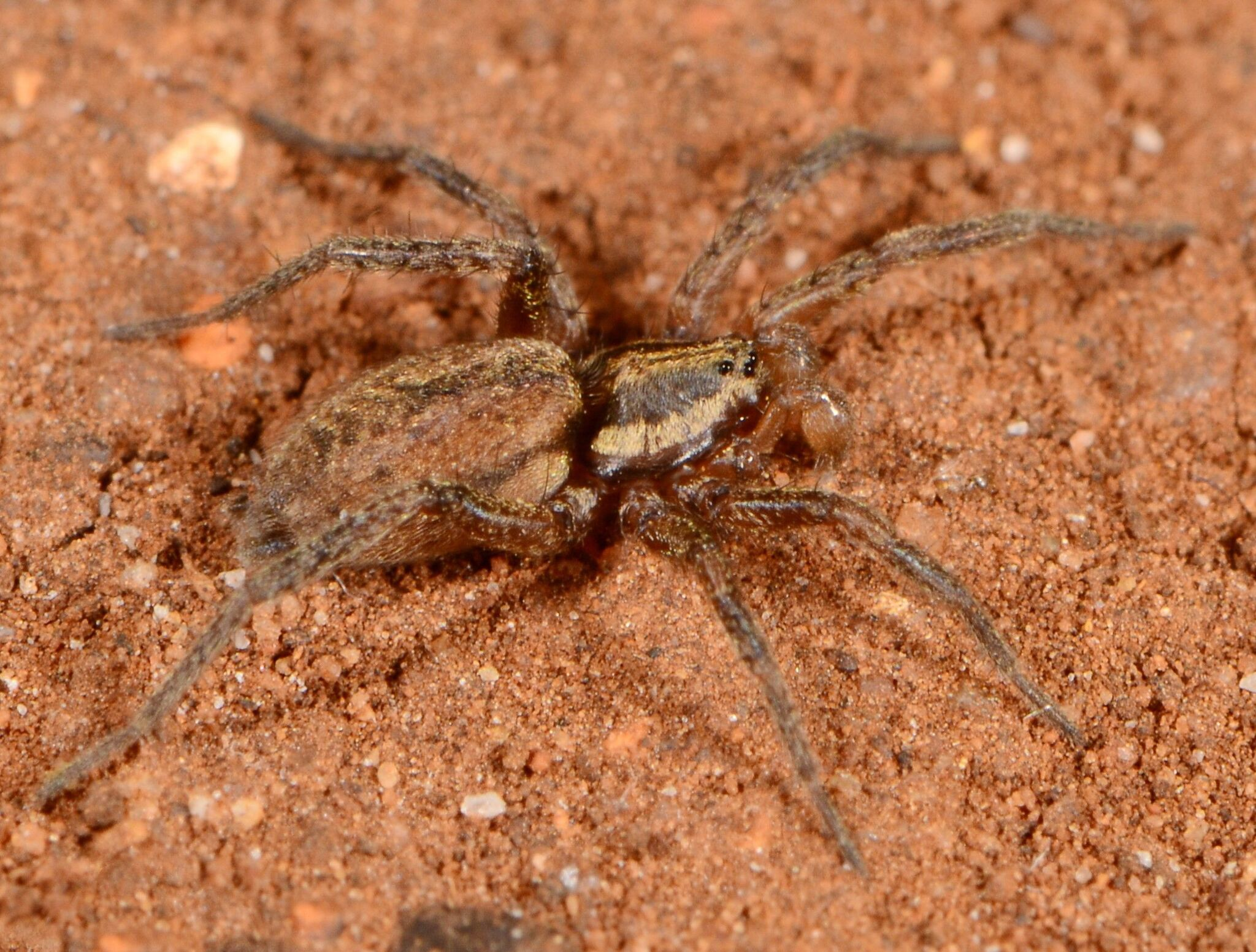
- Male
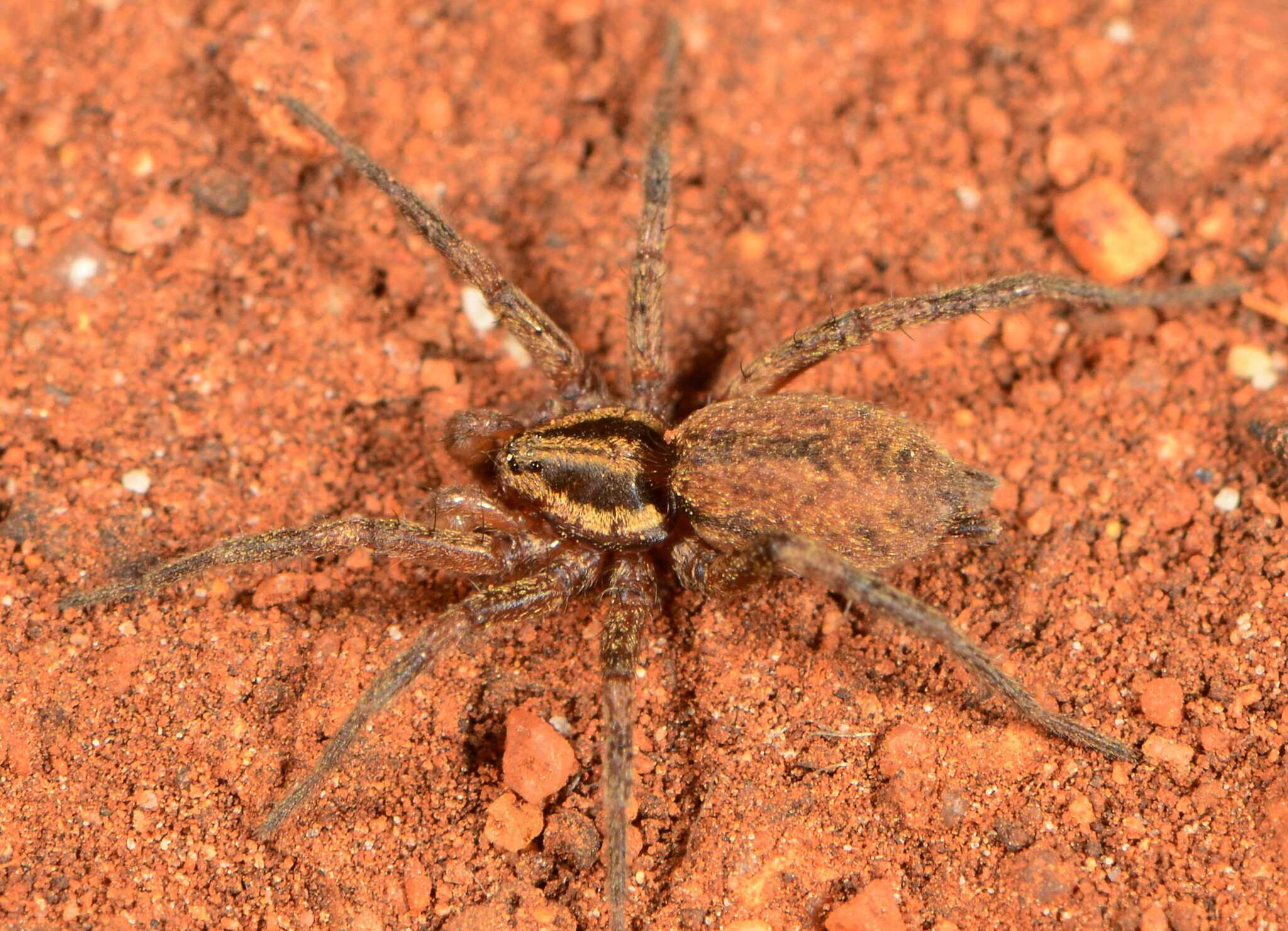
- Male

Scientific classification
- Kingdom: Animalia
- Phylum: Arthropoda
- Subphylum: Chelicerata
- Class: Arachnida
- Order: Araneae
- Infraorder: Araneomorphae
- Family: Gnaphosidae
- Genus: Asemesthes
- Species: A. lineatus

Binomial name
- Asemesthes lineatus Purcell, 1908

= Asemesthes lineatus =

Striped Asemesthes Ground Spider

Species of spider

Asemesthes lineatus is a species of spider in the family Gnaphosidae. It occurs in southern Africa and is commonly known as the striped Asemesthes ground spider.

== Distribution ==
Asemesthes lineatus occurs in Namibia, Botswana, Zambia, and South Africa. In South Africa, it is recorded from four provinces: Free State, Limpopo, Northern Cape, and Western Cape, at altitudes ranging from 72 to 1,560 m above sea level.

== Habitat and ecology ==
The species is a free-living ground dweller sampled from the Grassland, Savanna, Fynbos, and Nama Karoo biomes. It has also been recorded from pistachio orchards in agricultural systems.

== Description ==
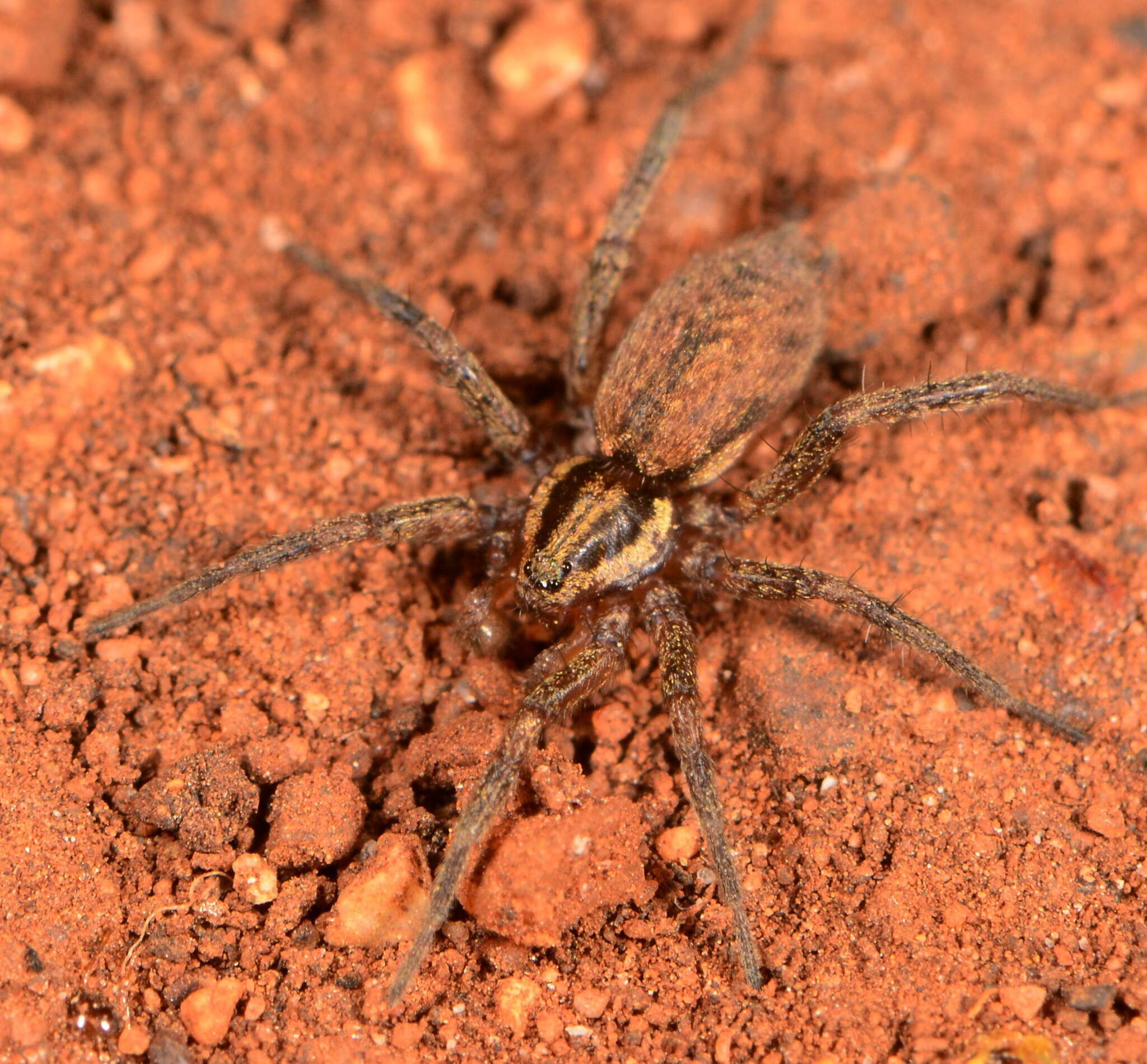
male

Asemesthes lineatus is known from both sexes. The posterior lateral eyes are much smaller than the anterior lateral eyes. The carapace is golden brown with a short, irregular, darkened band midway between the stria and lateral margin. The legs are slightly paler than the carapace. The opisthosoma is testaceous with chevron markings, a dark spot posteriorly midway to the spinnerets, and irregular dark spots. The total length is 5 mm.

== Conservation ==
Asemesthes lineatus is listed as Least Concern by the South African National Biodiversity Institute due to its wide distribution range. The species is protected in multiple reserves including Amanzi Private Game Reserve, Luvhondo Nature Reserve, Kgalagadi Transfrontier Park, Tswalu Kalahari Game Reserve, Benfontein Game Reserve, and Cederberg Wilderness Area.

== Taxonomy ==
The species was originally described by W. F. Purcell in 1908 from Rooibank in Namibia. It has not been revised since its original description.
