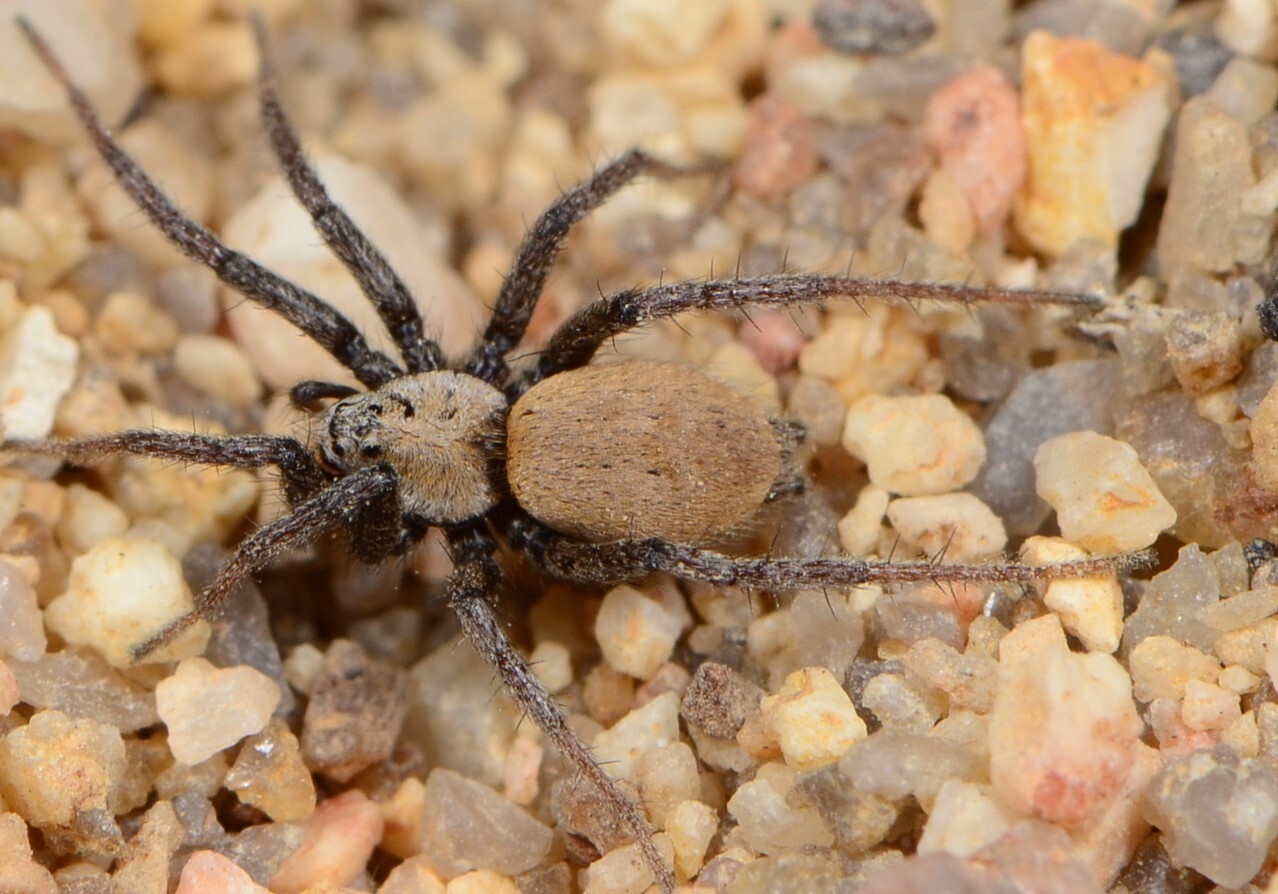
- Female
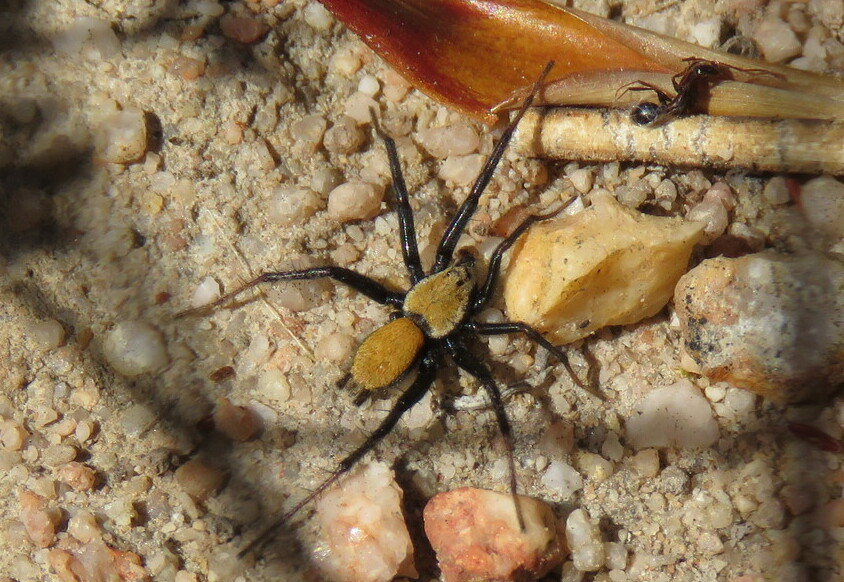
- A. subnubilus

Scientific classification
- Kingdom: Animalia
- Phylum: Arthropoda
- Subphylum: Chelicerata
- Class: Arachnida
- Order: Araneae
- Infraorder: Araneomorphae
- Family: Gnaphosidae
- Genus: Asemesthes
- Species: A. subnubilus

Binomial name
- Asemesthes subnubilus Simon, 1887

Synonyms
- Asemesthes aureus Purcell, 1908

= Asemesthes subnubilus =

Kalahari Asemesthes Ground Spider

Species of spider

Asemesthes subnubilus is a species of spider in the family Gnaphosidae. It is endemic to southern Africa and is commonly known as the Kalahari Asemesthes ground spider. This species is the type species of the genus Asemesthes.

== Distribution ==
Asemesthes subnubilus occurs in Namibia and South Africa. In South Africa, it is recorded from two provinces: Northern Cape and Western Cape, at altitudes ranging from 231 to 870 m above sea level.

== Habitat and ecology ==
The species is a free-living ground dweller sampled from the Succulent Karoo biome.

== Description ==
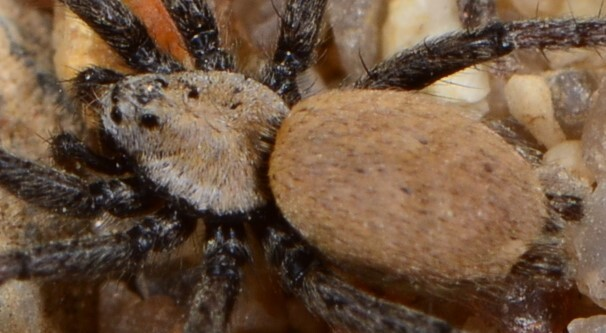
female

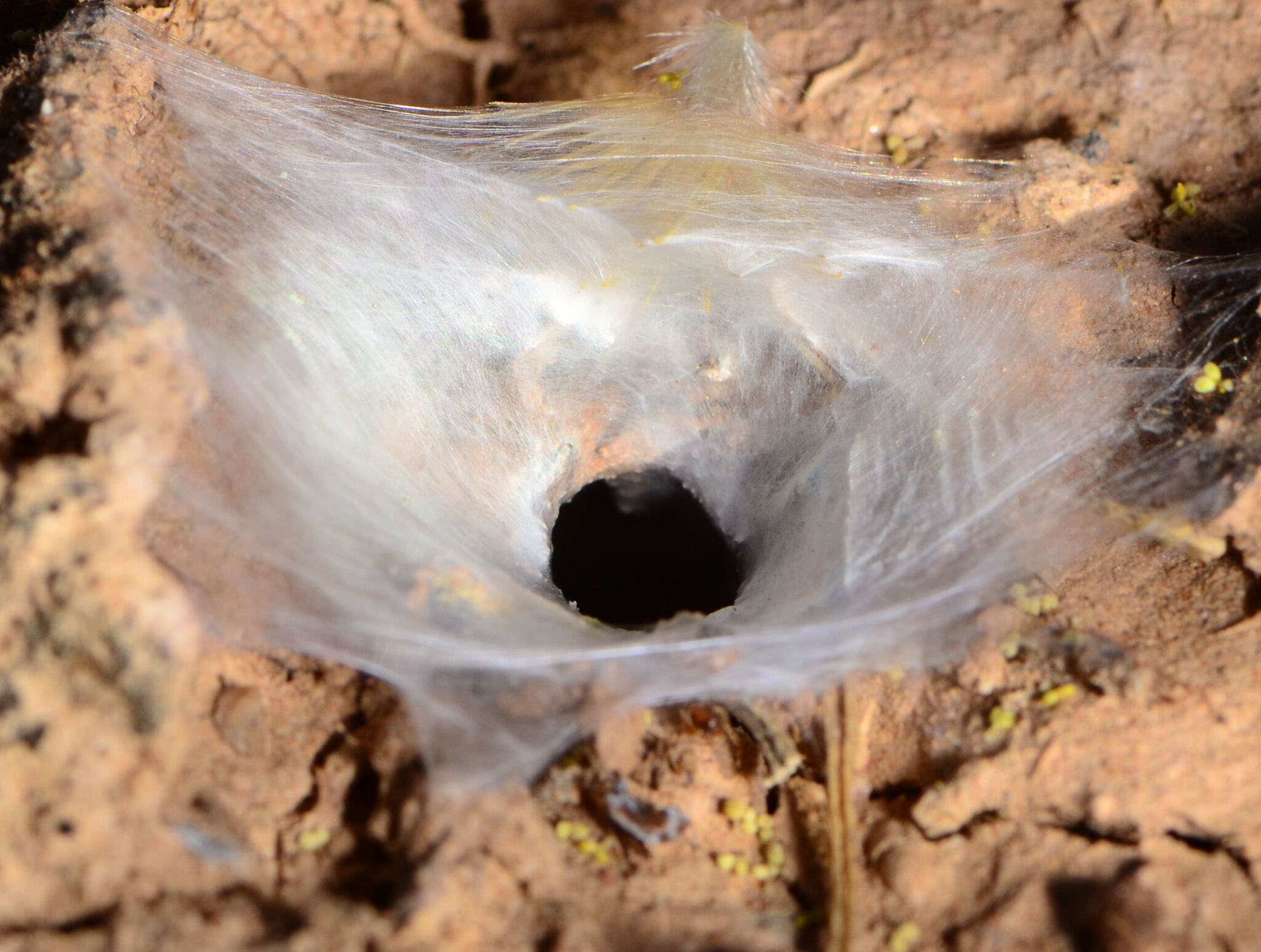
web

Asemesthes subnubilus is known from both sexes. The cephalothorax is smooth and dusky brown, with the ocular region being black. The opisthosoma is oval and dark ashy in colour above, with the under surface paler to dull testaceous. The sternum, chelicerae, and legs are dark brown, while the metatarsi and tarsi are lighter and yellowish red. The total length is 7 mm.

== Conservation ==
Asemesthes subnubilus is listed as Least Concern by the South African National Biodiversity Institute due to its wide distribution range. There are no significant threats to the species.

== Taxonomy ==
The species was originally described by Eugène Simon in 1887 from the Kalahari. It has not been revised since its original description. The species Asemesthes aureus, described by W. F. Purcell in 1908, is considered a junior synonym of A. subnubilus.
