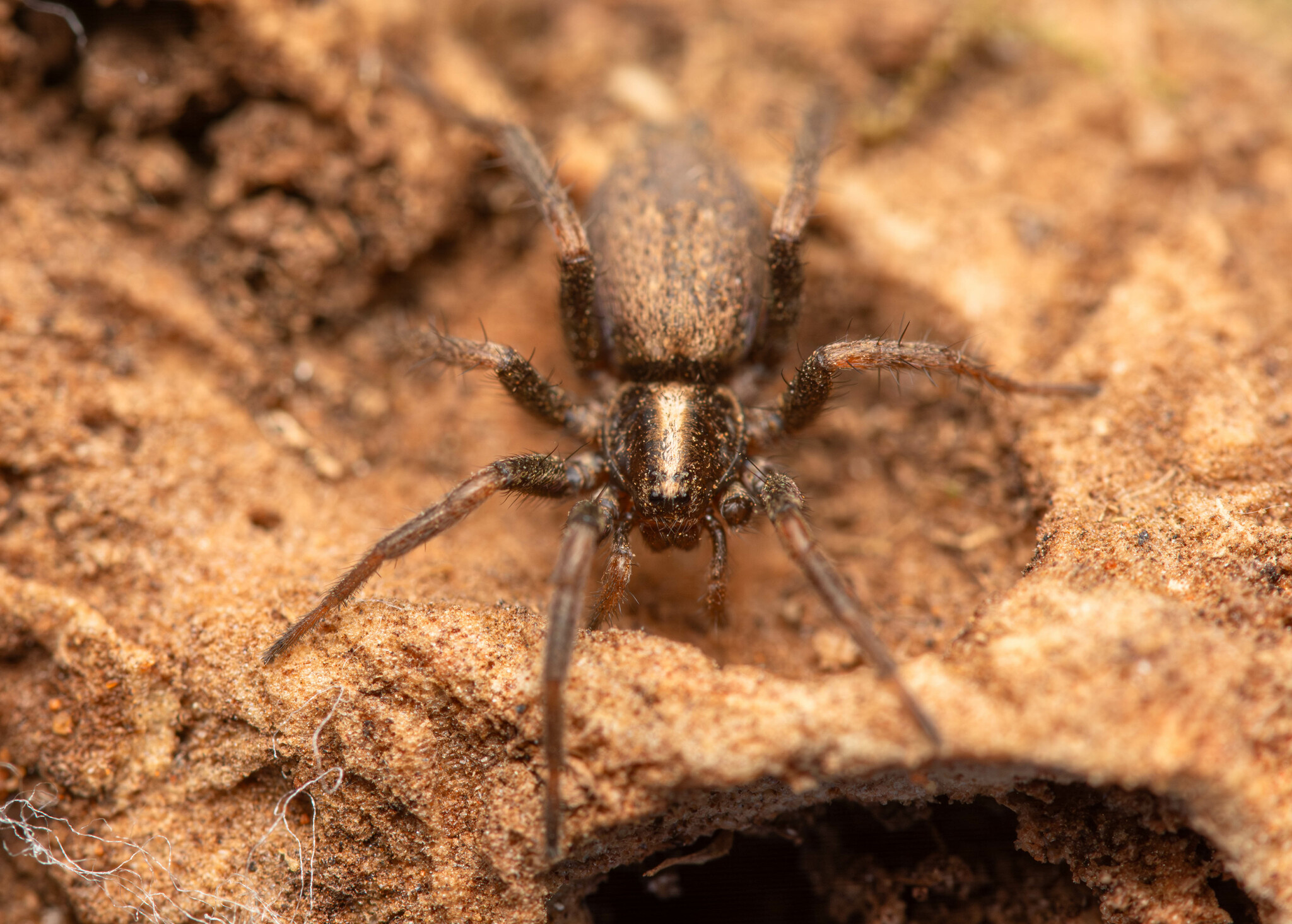

Scientific classification
- Kingdom: Animalia
- Phylum: Arthropoda
- Subphylum: Chelicerata
- Class: Arachnida
- Order: Araneae
- Infraorder: Araneomorphae
- Family: Gnaphosidae
- Genus: Asemesthes
- Species: A. purcelli

Binomial name
- Asemesthes purcelli Tucker, 1923

= Asemesthes purcelli =

Purcell's Asemesthes Ground Spider

Species of spider

Asemesthes purcelli is a species of spider in the family Gnaphosidae. It is endemic to southern Africa and is commonly known as Purcell's Asemesthes ground spider.

== Etymology ==
The species is named after W. F. Purcell, a South African arachnologist who made significant contributions to the study of southern African spiders.

== Distribution ==
Asemesthes purcelli occurs in Namibia and South Africa. In South Africa, it is recorded from six provinces: Free State, Gauteng, Limpopo, Mpumalanga, Northern Cape, and Western Cape, at altitudes ranging from 222 to 1,467 m above sea level.

== Habitat and ecology ==
The species is a free-living ground dweller sampled from the Fynbos, Grassland, and Savanna biomes, as well as from pistachio orchards in agricultural systems.

== Description ==
Asemesthes purcelli is known only from the female. The carapace is medium to dark brown, lighter in the centre and darkened laterally, clothed with sparse appressed hairs that are more numerous down the centre line, forming a white median band. The opisthosoma is dull greyish brown dorsally with a faint pattern consisting of a narrow anterior median dark band, followed by dark chevrons which diminish posteriorly. The sides are darkened, and the remainder of the dorsal surface has dark spots. The total length is 7 mm.

== Conservation ==
Asemesthes purcelli is listed as Least Concern by the South African National Biodiversity Institute due to its wide distribution range. The species is protected in multiple areas including Suikerbosrand Nature Reserve, Erfenis Dam Nature Reserve, Amanzi Private Game Reserve, Blouberg Nature Reserve, Kruger National Park, Karoo National Park, and Swartberg Nature Reserve.

== Taxonomy ==
The species was originally described by Richard William Ethelbert Tucker in 1923 from Montagu Baths in the Western Cape. It has not been revised since its original description.
