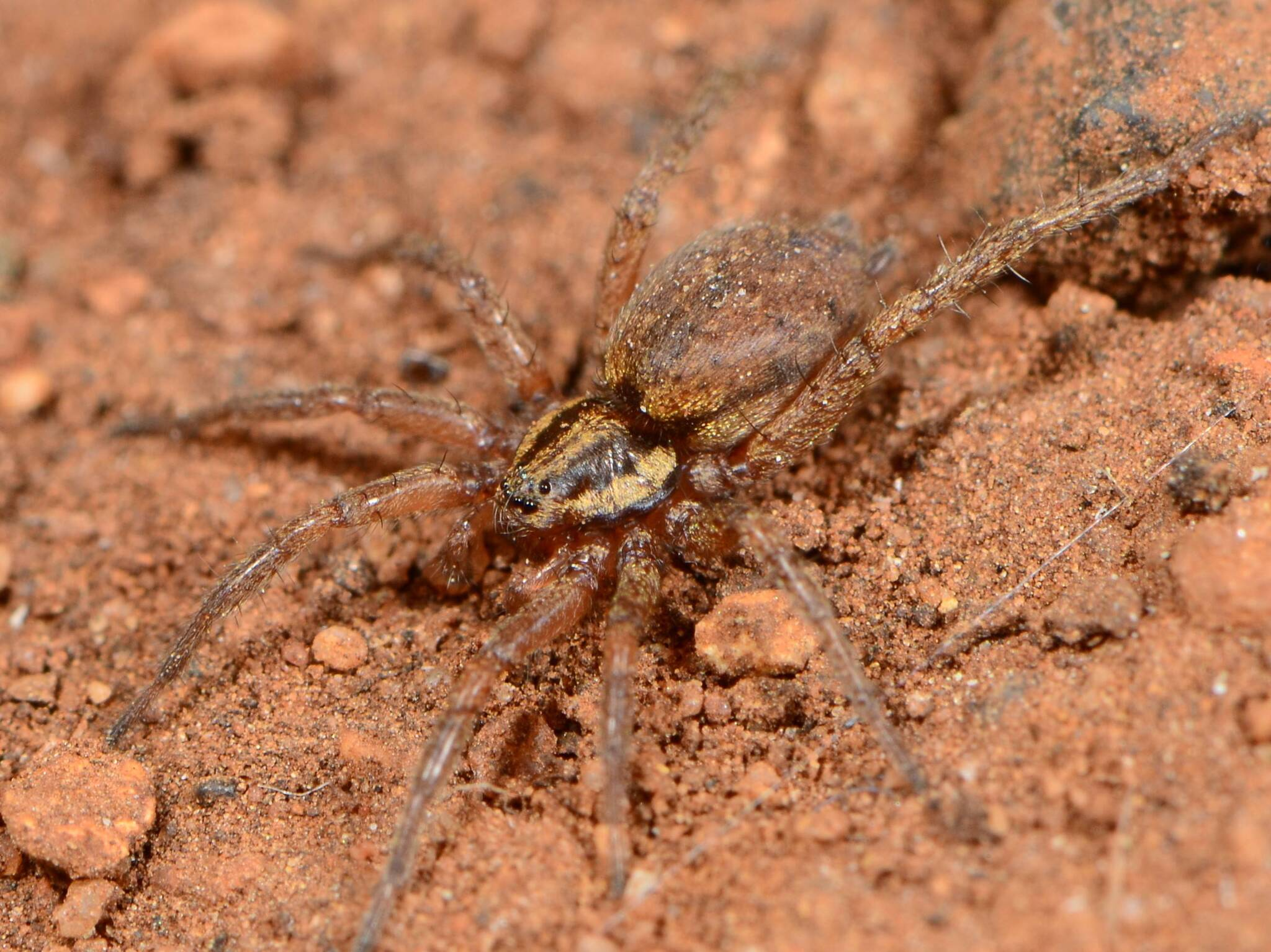
- Female
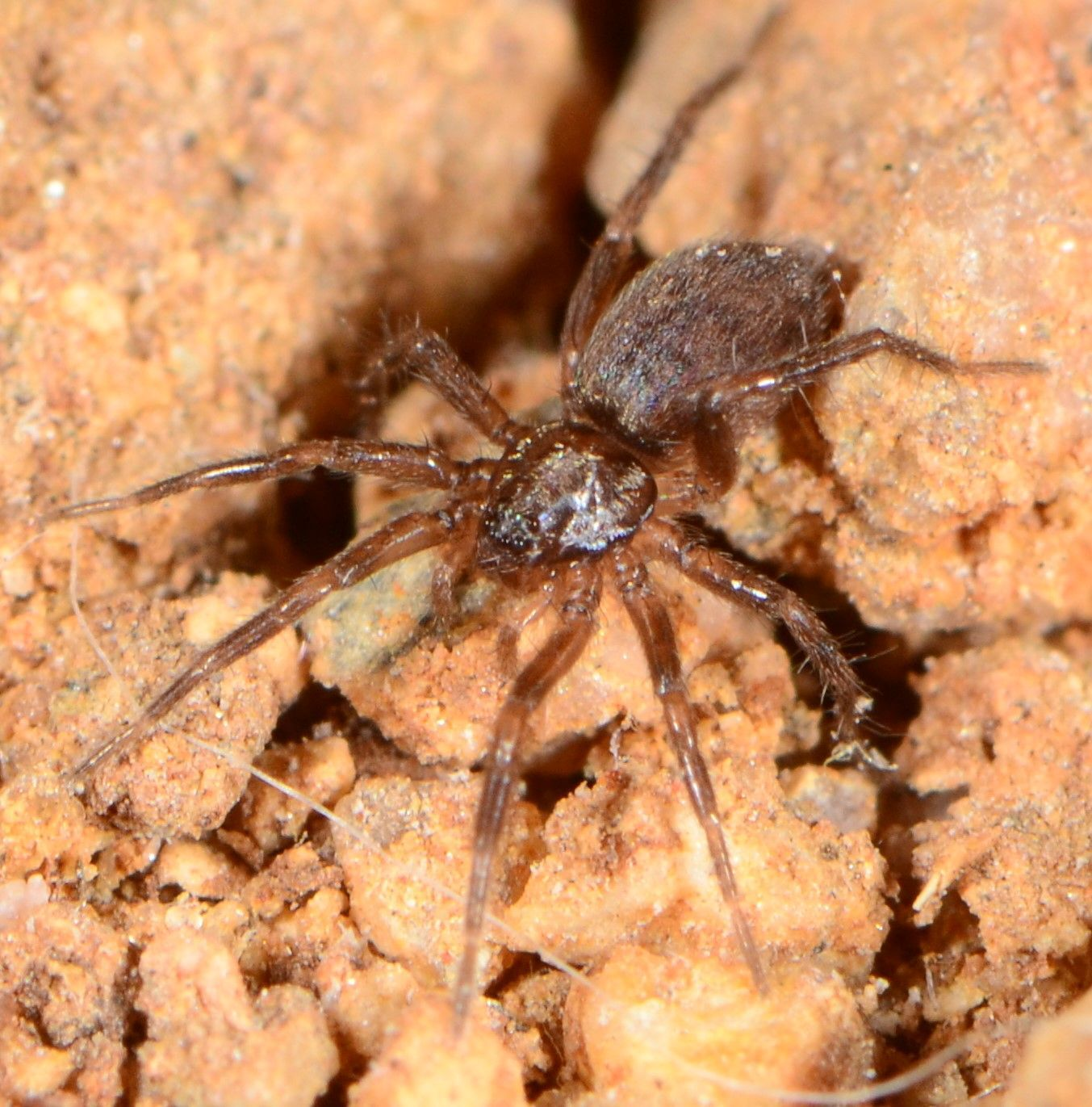
- Juvenile female

Scientific classification
- Kingdom: Animalia
- Phylum: Arthropoda
- Subphylum: Chelicerata
- Class: Arachnida
- Order: Araneae
- Infraorder: Araneomorphae
- Family: Gnaphosidae
- Genus: Asemesthes
- Species: A. ceresicola

Binomial name
- Asemesthes ceresicola Tucker, 1923

= Asemesthes ceresicola =

Common Asemesthes Ground Spider

Species of spider

Asemesthes ceresicola is a species of spider in the family Gnaphosidae. It is endemic to South Africa and is commonly known as the common Asemesthes ground spider.

== Distribution ==
Asemesthes ceresicola is widespread across South Africa, recorded from eight provinces at altitudes ranging from 61 to 1,758 m above sea level. The species occurs in Gauteng, Eastern Cape, KwaZulu-Natal, Limpopo, Mpumalanga, Northern Cape, North West, and Western Cape.

== Habitat and ecology ==
The species is a free-living ground dweller that has been sampled from all South African floral biomes. It has also been recorded from agricultural systems, including cotton and tomato crops.

== Description ==
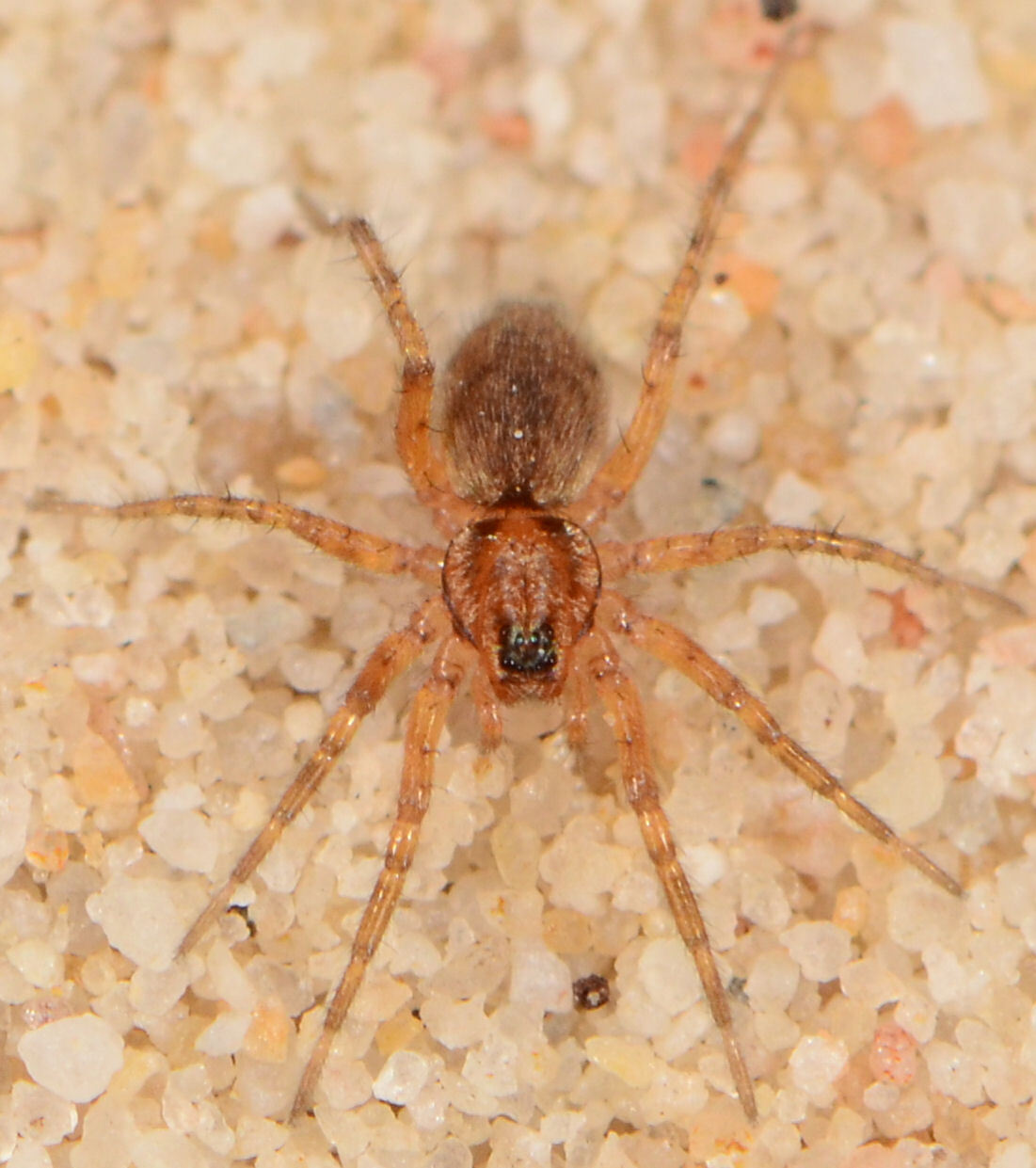
female

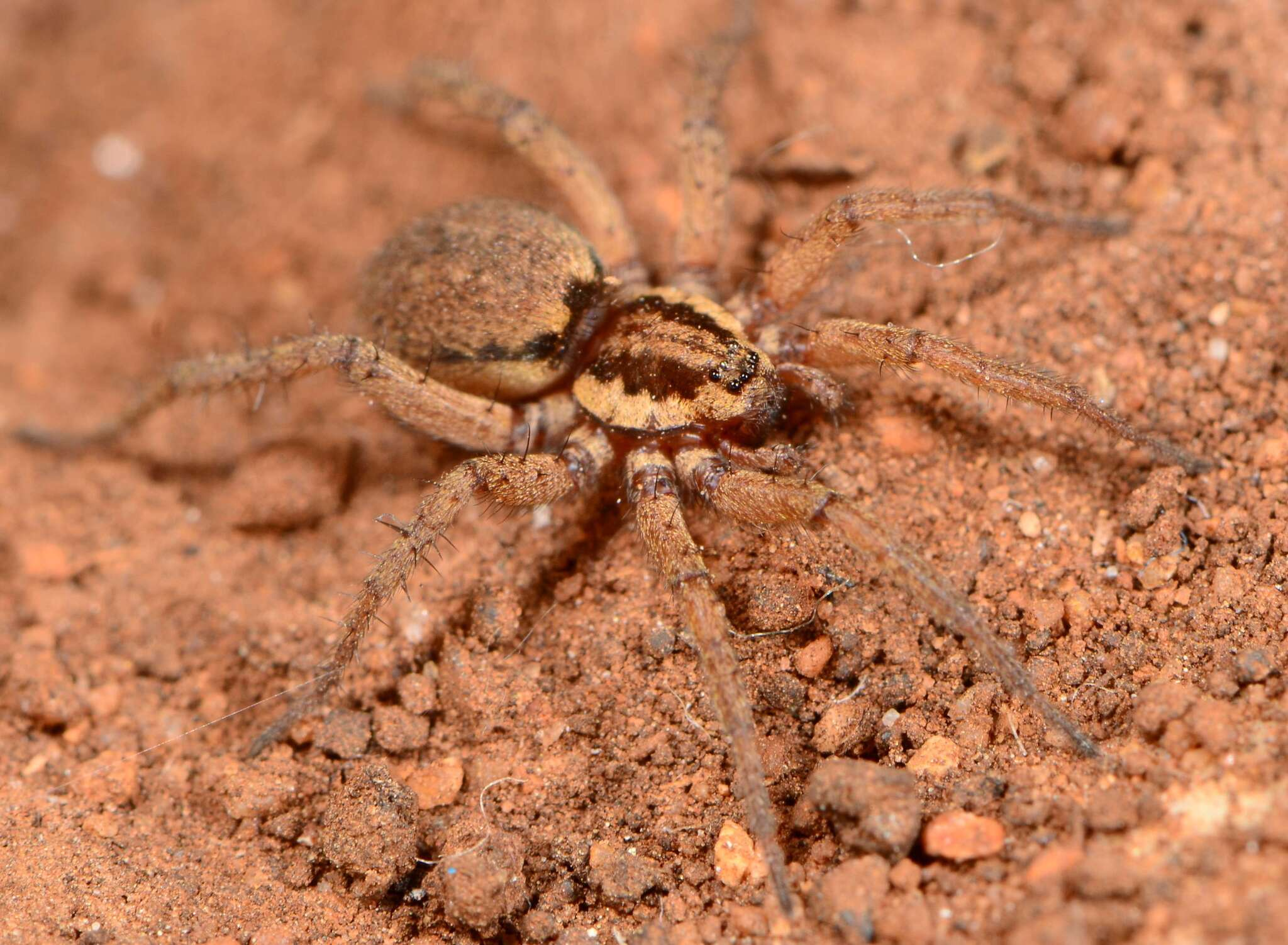
female

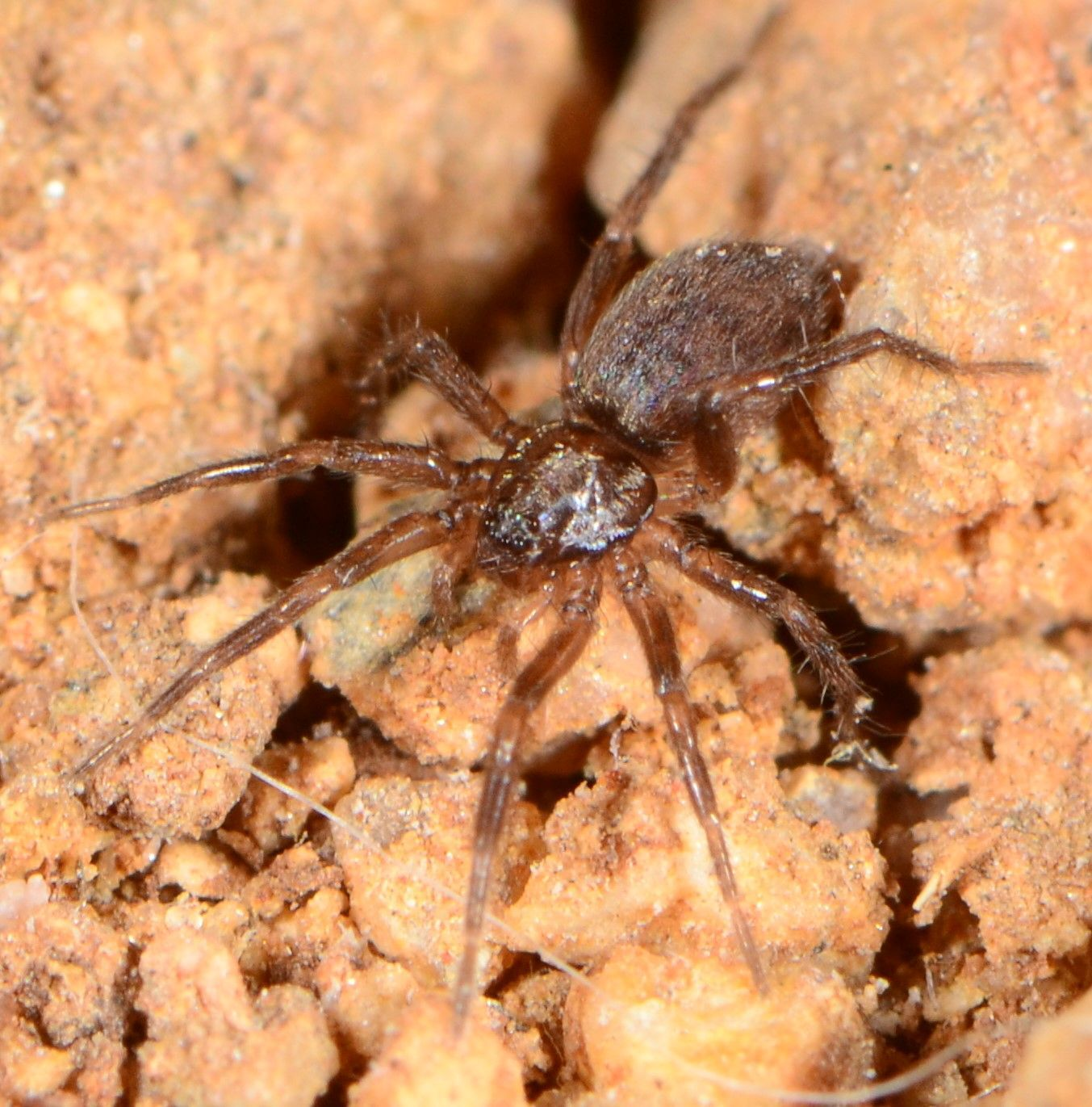
juvenile female

Asemesthes ceresicola is known from both sexes. The carapace is light yellowish brown with dark edges and dark bands on each side between the fovea and border. The legs are slightly darker than the carapace. The opisthosoma is dull testaceous dorsally with a serrated median dark band that is broken or constricted towards the centre and does not extend to the spinnerets. Irregular dark markings appear laterally. The total length is 5 mm.

== Conservation ==
Asemesthes ceresicola is listed as Least Concern by the South African National Biodiversity Institute due to its wide range across the country. The species is protected in more than 10 protected areas and no conservation actions are recommended.

== Taxonomy ==
The species was originally described by Richard William Ethelbert Tucker in 1923 from Ceres in the Western Cape. It has not been revised since its original description.
