= Asemesthes fodina =

Dendron Asemesthes Ground Spider

Conservation status
- Least Concern (SANBI Red List)

Scientific classification
- Kingdom: Animalia
- Phylum: Arthropoda
- Subphylum: Chelicerata
- Class: Arachnida
- Order: Araneae
- Infraorder: Araneomorphae
- Family: Gnaphosidae
- Genus: Asemesthes
- Species: A. fodina

Binomial name
- Asemesthes fodina Tucker, 1923

Species of spider

Asemesthes fodina is a species of spider in the family Gnaphosidae. It is endemic to southern Africa and is commonly known as the dendron Asemesthes ground spider.

== Distribution ==
Asemesthes fodina occurs in Namibia and South Africa. In South Africa, it is recorded only from Limpopo province at altitudes ranging from 527 to 1,025 m above sea level.

== Habitat and ecology ==
The species is a free-living ground dweller sampled from the Savanna biome.

== Description ==
Asemesthes fodina is known only from the male. The carapace is medium brown with black edges and irregular darkened lateral bands and slight radial darkenings. The opisthosoma is dull testaceous brown with lateral darkened mottling and an indistinct dorsal band, as well as a slight dorsal scutum. The total length is 4 mm.

== Conservation ==
Asemesthes fodina is listed as Least Concern by the South African National Biodiversity Institute due to its wide distribution range. More sampling is needed to collect the female.

== Taxonomy ==
The species was originally described by Richard William Ethelbert Tucker in 1923 from Tsumeb in Namibia. It has not been revised since its original description.
