= Asemesthes numisma =

Namibian Asemesthes Ground Spider

Conservation status
- Least Concern (SANBI Red List)

Scientific classification
- Kingdom: Animalia
- Phylum: Arthropoda
- Subphylum: Chelicerata
- Class: Arachnida
- Order: Araneae
- Infraorder: Araneomorphae
- Family: Gnaphosidae
- Genus: Asemesthes
- Species: A. numisma

Binomial name
- Asemesthes numisma Tucker, 1923

Species of spider

Asemesthes numisma is a species of spider in the family Gnaphosidae. It is endemic to southern Africa and is commonly known as the Namibian Asemesthes ground spider.

== Distribution ==
Asemesthes numisma occurs in Namibia and South Africa. In South Africa, it is recorded from five provinces: Gauteng, Limpopo, Mpumalanga, Northern Cape, and North West, at altitudes ranging from 154 to 1,523 m above sea level.

== Habitat and ecology ==
The species is a free-living ground dweller sampled from the Grassland, Nama Karoo, and Savanna biomes.

== Description ==
Asemesthes numisma is known from both sexes. The carapace is medium to dark brown and ornamented, with a darker ocular area and a distinct long oval or leaf-like dark mark on each side, running obliquely outwards from an almost central spot. The opisthosoma is dull testaceous with a median purple-black band extending over half its length, continued as three spots on each side, and terminating in a transverse dark mark, with additional dark markings above the spinnerets. The coxae are paler, and the legs are brown with slightly darkened femora. The total length ranges from 4 to 8 mm.

== Conservation ==
Asemesthes numisma is listed as Least Concern by the South African National Biodiversity Institute due to its wide distribution range. The species is protected in multiple areas including Kruger National Park, Augrabies Falls National Park, Venetia Limpopo Valley Reserve, Blouberg Nature Reserve, and Luvhondo Nature Reserve.

== Taxonomy ==
The species was originally described by Richard William Ethelbert Tucker in 1923 from Namsem, Namibia. It has not been revised since its original description.
