= Asemesthes paynteri =

Paynter's Asemesthes Ground Spider

Conservation status
- Least Concern (SANBI Red List)

Scientific classification
- Kingdom: Animalia
- Phylum: Arthropoda
- Subphylum: Chelicerata
- Class: Arachnida
- Order: Araneae
- Infraorder: Araneomorphae
- Family: Gnaphosidae
- Genus: Asemesthes
- Species: A. paynteri

Binomial name
- Asemesthes paynteri Tucker, 1923

Species of spider

Asemesthes paynteri is a species of spider in the family Gnaphosidae. It is endemic to South Africa and is commonly known as Paynter's Asemesthes ground spider.

== Distribution ==
Asemesthes paynteri is recorded from five provinces in South Africa: Gauteng, Limpopo, Mpumalanga, North West, Northern Cape, and Western Cape, at altitudes ranging from 33 to 1,625 m above sea level.

== Habitat and ecology ==
The species is a free-living ground dweller sampled from the Fynbos, Grassland, and Savanna biomes.

== Description ==
Asemesthes paynteri is known only from the female. The carapace is yellowish brown with dark edges and a slightly mottled surface. The opisthosoma is testaceous, and the sternum is about the same colour as the carapace. The total length is 5.75 mm.

== Conservation ==
Asemesthes paynteri is listed as Least Concern by the South African National Biodiversity Institute due to its wide range and absence of known threats. The species is protected in eight protected areas.

== Taxonomy ==
The species was originally described by Richard William Ethelbert Tucker in 1923 from Touws River in the Western Cape. It has not been revised since its original description.
