= Asemesthes lamberti =

Scientific classification
- Kingdom: Animalia
- Phylum: Arthropoda
- Subphylum: Chelicerata
- Class: Arachnida
- Order: Araneae
- Infraorder: Araneomorphae
- Family: Gnaphosidae
- Genus: Asemesthes
- Species: A. lamberti

Binomial name
- Asemesthes lamberti Tucker, 1923

Species of spider

Asemesthes lamberti is a species of spider in the family Gnaphosidae. It is endemic to the Western Cape of South Africa.

== Distribution ==
Asemesthes lamberti is known from Lamberts Bay and the Cederberg Wilderness Area in the Western Cape at an altitude of 24 m above sea level.

== Habitat and ecology ==
The species is a free-living ground dweller found in the Fynbos biome.

== Description ==
Asemesthes lamberti is known only from the female. The carapace is medium brown with dark edges, lateral darkened mottling, and a faint broad median band of prone white hairs. The dorsal surface of the opisthosoma has a dark greyish median band extending halfway and followed by a series of arrow-shaped dark marks narrowing towards the spinnerets. The lateral and posterior borders of the upper surface are dark. The legs are slightly lighter than the carapace, with darkened and mottled femora on the upper surface. The total length is 7 mm.

== Conservation ==
Asemesthes lamberti is listed as Data Deficient due to taxonomic reasons, as identification of the species remains problematic. The species is protected in the Cederberg Wilderness Area. More sampling is needed to collect the male and determine the species' range.

== Taxonomy ==
The species was originally described by Richard William Ethelbert Tucker in 1923 from Lamberts Bay. It has not been revised since its original description.
