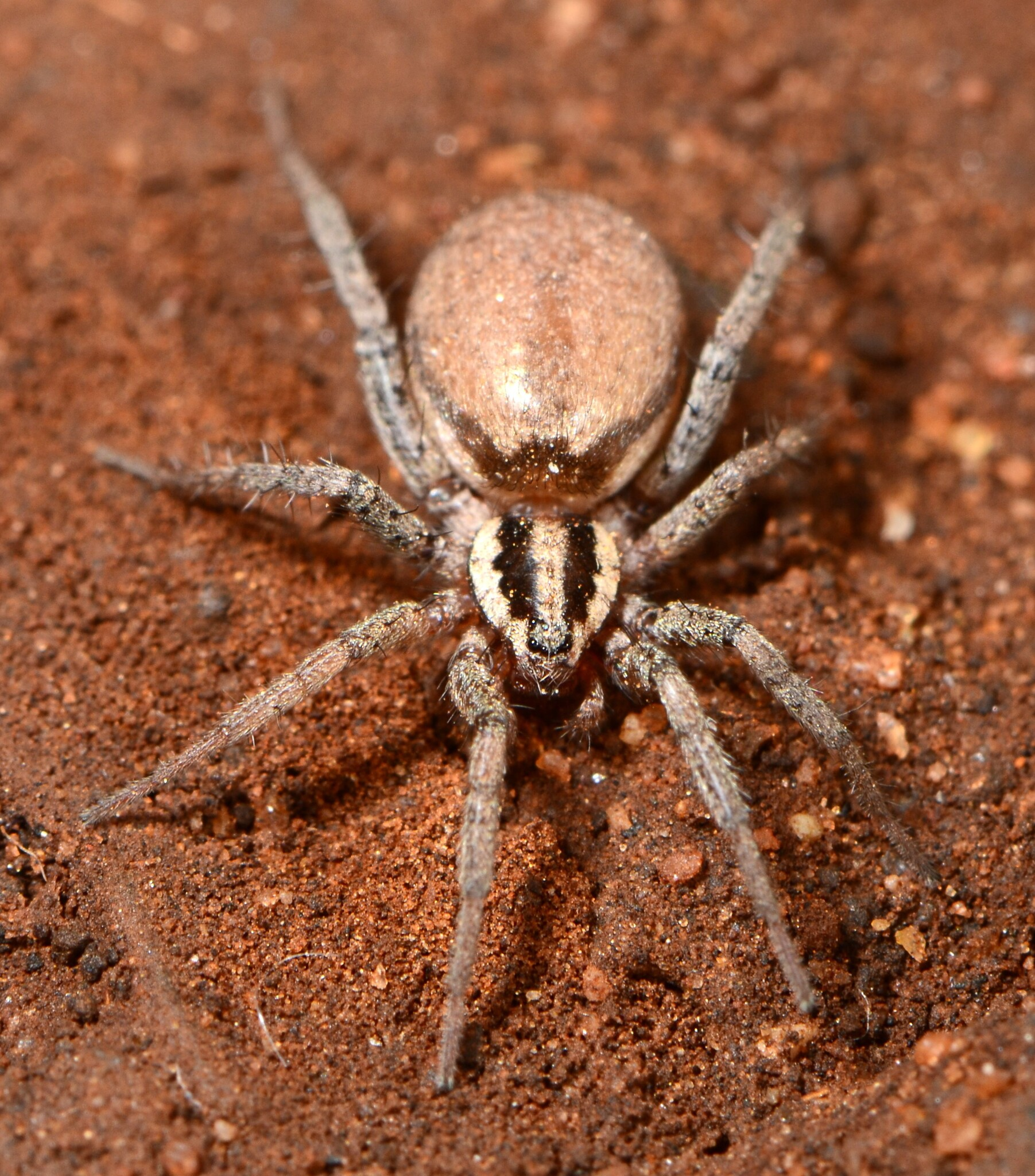
- Adult female from South Africa
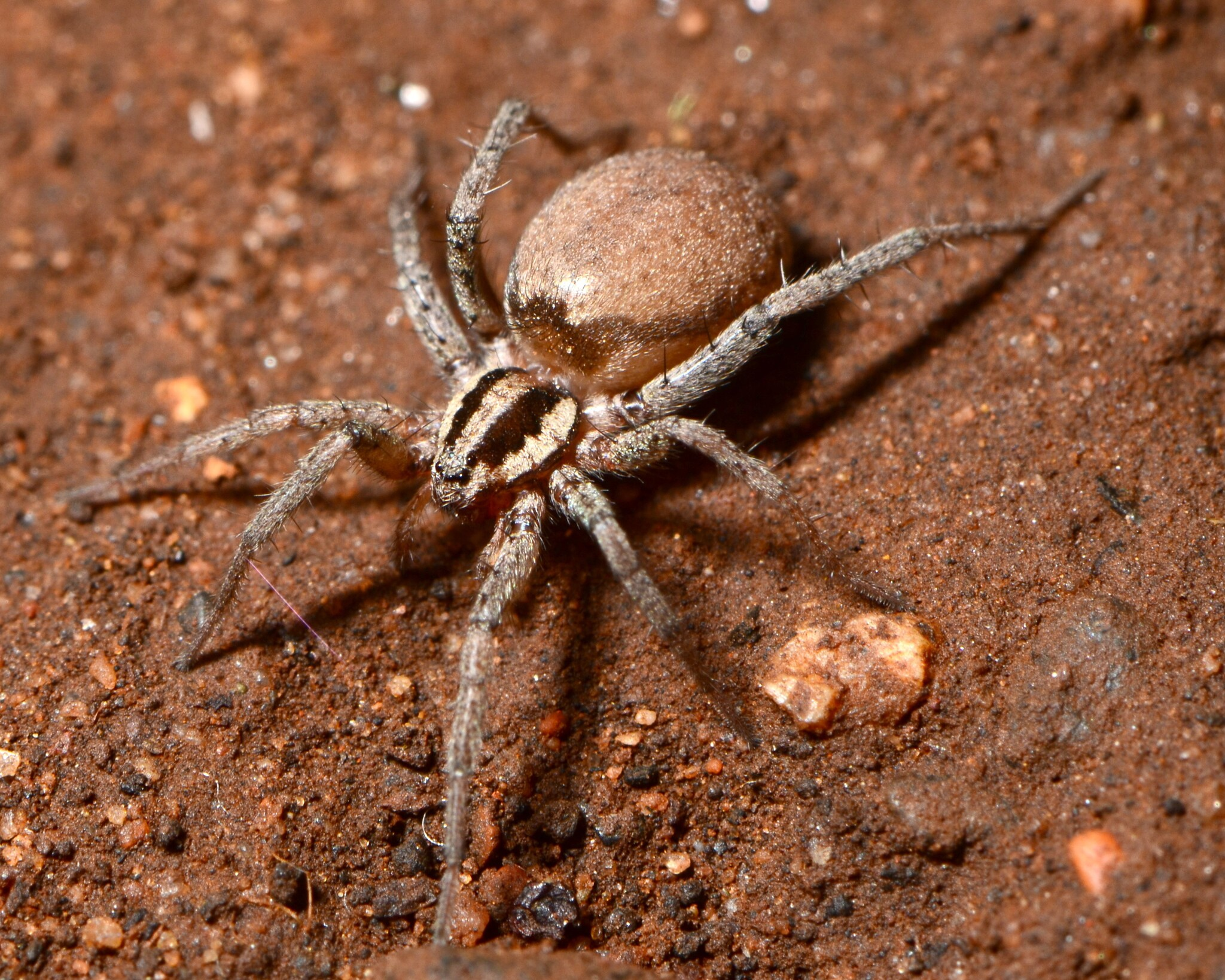

Conservation status
- Least Concern (SANBI Red List)

Scientific classification
- Kingdom: Animalia
- Phylum: Arthropoda
- Subphylum: Chelicerata
- Class: Arachnida
- Order: Araneae
- Infraorder: Araneomorphae
- Family: Gnaphosidae
- Genus: Asemesthes
- Species: A. flavipes

Binomial name
- Asemesthes flavipes Purcell, 1908

= Asemesthes flavipes =

Namibian Asemesthes Ground Spider

Species of spider

Asemesthes flavipes is a species of spider in the family Gnaphosidae. It is endemic to southern Africa and is commonly known as the Namibian Asemesthes ground spider.

== Distribution ==
Asemesthes flavipes occurs in Namibia and South Africa. In South Africa, it is recorded only from Limpopo province at altitudes ranging from 840 to 1,310 m above sea level.

== Habitat and ecology ==
The species is a free-living ground dweller sampled only from the Savanna biome.

== Description ==
Asemesthes flavipes is known only from the female. The carapace is light brown, darker anteriorly, with dark edges and dark bands. The opisthosoma is dull testaceous with lateral darkenings and a median irregular dark band. The legs are pale yellow, redder distally, with darkened trochanters. The total length is 6 mm.

== Conservation ==
Asemesthes flavipes is listed as Least Concern by the South African National Biodiversity Institute due to its wide distribution range. The species is protected in Polokwane Nature Reserve and Luvhondo Nature Reserve.

== Taxonomy ==
The species was originally described by W. F. Purcell in 1908 from Lüderitz Bay in Namibia. It has not been revised since its original description.
