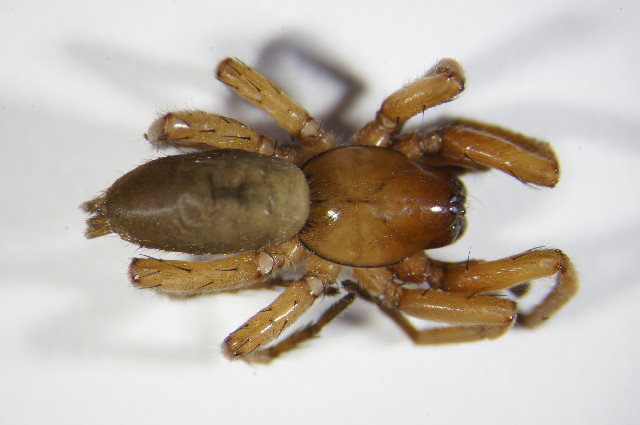
- D. pubescens

Scientific classification
- Kingdom: Animalia
- Phylum: Arthropoda
- Subphylum: Chelicerata
- Class: Arachnida
- Order: Araneae
- Infraorder: Araneomorphae
- Family: Gnaphosidae
- Genus: Drassodes; Westring, 1851

Type species
- D. lapidosus (Walckenaer, 1802)

Species
- 162, see text

Synonyms
- Geodrassus Chamberlin, 1922; Kirmaka Roewer, 1961; Mesklia Roewer, 1928; Sillemia Reimoser, 1935; Siruasus Roewer, 1961

= Drassodes =

Drassodes Temporal range: Palaeogene–present

Genus of spiders

Drassodes is a genus of ground spiders that was first described by Niklas Westring in 1851. They are brown, gray, and red spiders that live under rocks or bark in mostly dry habitats, and are generally 3.8 to 11.6 millimetres (0.15 to 0.46 in) long, but can reach up to 20 millimetres (0.79 in) in length.

== Species ==
As of May 2019 it contains 162 species:

- D. adisensis Strand, 1906 – Ethiopia
- D. affinis (Nicolet, 1849) – Chile
- D. afghanus Roewer, 1961 – Afghanistan
- D. albicans (Simon, 1878) – Mediterranean
- D. andamanensis Tikader, 1977 – India (Andaman Is.)
- D. andorranus Denis, 1938 – Andorra
- D. angulus Platnick & Shadab, 1976 – USA
- D. arapensis Strand, 1908 – Peru
- D. archibensis Ponomarev & Alieva, 2008 – Russia (Caucasus)
- D. assimilatus (Blackwall, 1865) – Canary Is., Cape Verde Is.
- D. astrologus (O. Pickard-Cambridge, 1874) – India
- D. auriculoides Barrows, 1919 – USA
- D. auritus Schenkel, 1963 – Russia (Europe), Kazakhstan, China
- D. bechuanicus Tucker, 1923 – South Africa
- D. bendamiranus Roewer, 1961 – Afghanistan
- D. bicurvatus Roewer, 1961 – Afghanistan
- D. bifidus Kovblyuk & Seyyar, 2009 – Turkey
- D. brachythelis (Thorell, 1890) – Indonesia (Sumatra)
- D. braendegaardi Caporiacco, 1949 – Kenya
- D. caffrerianus Purcell, 1907 – South Africa
- D. calceatus Purcell, 1907 – South Africa
- D. cambridgei Roewer, 1951 – India
- D. canaglensis Caporiacco, 1927 – Italy
- D. carinivulvus Caporiacco, 1934 – India
- D. caspius Ponomarev & Tsvetkov, 2006 – Turkey, Russia (Europe, Caucasus), Kazakhstan
- D. cerinus Simon, 1897 – India
- D. charcoviae (Thorell, 1875) – Ukraine
- D. charitonovi Tuneva, 2004 – Kazakhstan
- D. chybyndensis Esyunin & Tuneva, 2002 – Russia (Europe to Central Asia), Kazakhstan, Iran
- D. clavifemur (Reimoser, 1935) – India (Karakorum, Kashmir)
- D. crassipalpus (Roewer, 1961) – Afghanistan
- D. cupa Tuneva, 2004 – Kazakhstan
- D. cupreus (Blackwall, 1834) – Europe, Caucasus, Kazakhstan, Russia (Europe to Far East)
- D. dagestanus Ponomarev & Alieva, 2008 – Russia (Caucasus)
- D. daliensis Yang & Song, 2003 – China
- D. delicatus (Blackwall, 1867) – India
- D. deoprayagensis Tikader & Gajbe, 1975 – India
- D. depilosus Dönitz & Strand, 1906 – Japan
- D. deserticola Simon, 1893 – Algeria, Libya
- D. difficilis (Simon, 1878) – Spain, France, Italy, Turkey?
- D. dispulsoides Schenkel, 1963 – China
- D. distinctus (Lucas, 1846) – Algeria
- D. dregei Purcell, 1907 – South Africa
- D. drydeni Petrunkevitch, 1914 – Myanmar
- D. ellenae (Barrion & Litsinger, 1995) – Philippines
- D. ereptor Purcell, 1907 – South Africa
- D. falciger Jézéquel, 1965 – Ivory Coast
- D. fedtschenkoi (Kroneberg, 1875) – Uzbekistan
- D. fugax (Simon, 1878) – Portugal, Spain, France, Italy, Central Asia, China
- D. gangeticus Tikader & Gajbe, 1975 – India
- D. gia Melic & Barrientos, 2017 – Spain
- D. gilvus Tullgren, 1910 – Tanzania
- D. gooldi Purcell, 1907 – South Africa
- D. gosiutus Chamberlin, 1919 – USA, Canada
- D. gujaratensis Patel & Patel, 1975 – India
- D. hamiger (Thorell, 1877) – Indonesia (Sulawesi)
- D. hebei Song, Zhu & Zhang, 2004 – China
- D. helenae Purcell, 1907 – South Africa
- D. heterophthalmus Simon, 1905 – India
- D. himalayensis Tikader & Gajbe, 1975 – India
- D. ignobilis Petrunkevitch, 1914 – Myanmar
- D. imbecillus (L. Koch, 1875) – Ethiopia
- D. inermis (Simon, 1878) – Spain (Menorca), France
- D. infletus (O. Pickard-Cambridge, 1885) – China (Yarkand), Russia (South Siberia), Mongolia
- D. insidiator Thorell, 1897 – Myanmar
- D. insignis (Blackwall, 1862) – Brazil
- D. interemptor (O. Pickard-Cambridge, 1885) – China (Yarkand)
- D. interlisus (O. Pickard-Cambridge, 1885) – China (Yarkand)
- D. interpolator (O. Pickard-Cambridge, 1885) – Tajikistan, China (Yarkand)
- D. involutus (O. Pickard-Cambridge, 1885) – China (Yarkand)
- D. jakkabagensis Charitonov, 1946 – Uzbekistan, Turkmenistan
- D. jiufeng Tang, Song & Zhang, 2001 – China
- D. kaszabi Loksa, 1965 – Russia (South Siberia), Mongolia
- D. katunensis Marusik, Hippa & Koponen, 1996 – Russia (South Siberia)
- D. kibonotensis Tullgren, 1910 – Tanzania
- D. krausi (Roewer, 1961) – Afghanistan
- D. kwantungensis Saito, 1937 – China
- D. lacertosus (O. Pickard-Cambridge, 1872) – Greece, Turkey, Israel, Syria
- D. lapidosus (Walckenaer, 1802) (type) – Europe, Turkey, Israel, Caucasus, Russia (Europe to Far East), Central Asia, China, Korea, Japan
  - Drassodes l. bidens (Simon, 1878) – France
- D. lapsus (O. Pickard-Cambridge, 1885) – China (Yarkand)
- D. licenti Schenkel, 1953 – Mongolia
- D. lindbergi Roewer, 1961 – Afghanistan
- D. lividus Denis, 1958 – Afghanistan
- D. longispinus Marusik & Logunov, 1995 – Russia (South Siberia, Far East), China, Korea
- D. lophognathus Purcell, 1907 – South Africa
- D. luridus (O. Pickard-Cambridge, 1874) – India
- D. luteomicans (Simon, 1878) – Southern Europe
- D. lutescens (C. L. Koch, 1839) – Mediterranean, Ukraine, Caucasus, Russia (Europe) to Central Asia, Pakistan
- D. lyratus Purcell, 1907 – South Africa
- D. lyriger Simon, 1909 – Ethiopia
- D. macilentus (O. Pickard-Cambridge, 1874) – India
- D. malagassicus (Butler, 1880) – Madagascar
- D. mandibularis (L. Koch, 1866) – Russia (Europe)
- D. manducator (Thorell, 1897) – Myanmar
- D. masculus Tucker, 1923 – South Africa
- D. mauritanicus Denis, 1945 – North Africa
- D. meghalayaensis Tikader & Gajbe, 1977 – India
- D. mirus Platnick & Shadab, 1976 – Russia (Far East), North America
- D. montenegrinus (Kulczyński, 1897) – Croatia, Serbia
- D. monticola (Kroneberg, 1875) – Kazakhstan, Uzbekistan, Tajikistan
- D. nagqu Song, Zhu & Zhang, 2004 – China
- D. narayanpurensis Gajbe, 2005 – India
- D. natali Esyunin & Tuneva, 2002 – Russia (Europe), Kazakhstan
- D. neglectus (Keyserling, 1887) – Russia (Middle to East Siberia, Far East), North America
- D. nox Dönitz & Strand, 1906 – Japan
- D. nugatorius (Karsch, 1881) – Libya, Arabia
- D. obscurus (Lucas, 1846) – Algeria
- D. parauritus Song, Zhu & Zhang, 2004 – China
- D. paroculus Simon, 1893 – Spain
- D. parvidens Caporiacco, 1934 – India, Pakistan
- D. pashanensis Tikader & Gajbe, 1977 – India
- D. pectinifer Schenkel, 1936 – China
- D. phagduaensis Tikader, 1964 – Nepal
- D. placidulus Simon, 1914 – France
- D. platnicki Song, Zhu & Zhang, 2004 – Russia (Europe to South Siberia), Mongolia, China
- D. prosthesimiformis Strand, 1906 – Ethiopia
- D. pseudolesserti Loksa, 1965 – Kazakhstan, Mongolia, China
- D. pubescens (Thorell, 1856) – Europe, Turkey, Israel, Caucasus, Russia (Europe to Far East), Iran, Central Asia, China, Japan
- D. robatus Roewer, 1961 – Afghanistan
- D. rostratus Esyunin & Tuneva, 2002 – Russia (Europe), Kazakhstan
- D. rubicundulus Caporiacco, 1934 – India, Pakistan
- D. rubidus (Simon, 1878) – Portugal, Spain, France, Italy (Sardinia)
- D. rugichelis Denis, 1962 – Madeira
- D. russulus (Thorell, 1890) – Indonesia (Java)
- D. saccatus (Emerton, 1890) – North America
- D. saganus Strand, 1918 – Japan
- D. sagarensis Tikader, 1982 – India
- D. saitoi Schenkel, 1963 – China
- D. serratichelis (Roewer, 1928) – Spain (Majorca), Greece, Turkey, Ukraine, Israel. Introduced to USA
- D. serratidens Schenkel, 1963 – Russia (South Siberia to Far East), China, Korea, Japan
- D. sesquidentatus Purcell, 1908 – South Africa
- D. shawanensis Song, Zhu & Zhang, 2004 – China
- D. similis Nosek, 1905 – Turkey
- D. simplex Kulczyński, 1926 – Russia (Kamchatka)
- D. simplicivulvus Caporiacco, 1940 – Ethiopia
- D. singulariformis Roewer, 1951 – India
- D. sirmourensis (Tikader & Gajbe, 1977) – India, China
- D. sitae Tikader & Gajbe, 1975 – India
- D. sockniensis (Karsch, 1881) – Libya
- D. solitarius Purcell, 1907 – South Africa
- D. soussensis Denis, 1956 – Morocco
- D. splendens Tucker, 1923 – South Africa
- D. stationis Tucker, 1923 – South Africa
- D. sternatus Strand, 1906 – Ethiopia
- D. striatus (L. Koch, 1866) – Hungary, Balkans, Romania, Ukraine
- D. subviduatus Strand, 1906 – Ethiopia
- D. taehadongensis Paik, 1995 – Korea
- D. tarrhunensis (Karsch, 1881) – Libya
- D. termezius Roewer, 1961 – Afghanistan
- D. tesselatus Purcell, 1907 – South Africa
- D. thaleri Hervé, 2009 – France
- D. thimei (L. Koch, 1878) – Turkmenistan
- D. tikaderi (Gajbe, 1987) – India
- D. tiritschensis Miller & Buchar, 1972 – Afghanistan
- D. tortuosus Tucker, 1923 – South Africa
- D. unicolor (O. Pickard-Cambridge, 1872) – Greece (Crete), Libya, Egypt, Lebanon, Israel
- D. uritai Tang, Oldemtu, Zhao & Song, 1999 – China
- D. venustus (Nicolet, 1849) – Chile
- D. villosus (Thorell, 1856) – Europe, Turkey, Central Asia, Russia (Europe to Far East)
- D. viveki (Gajbe, 1992) – India
- D. vorax Strand, 1906 – Ethiopia
