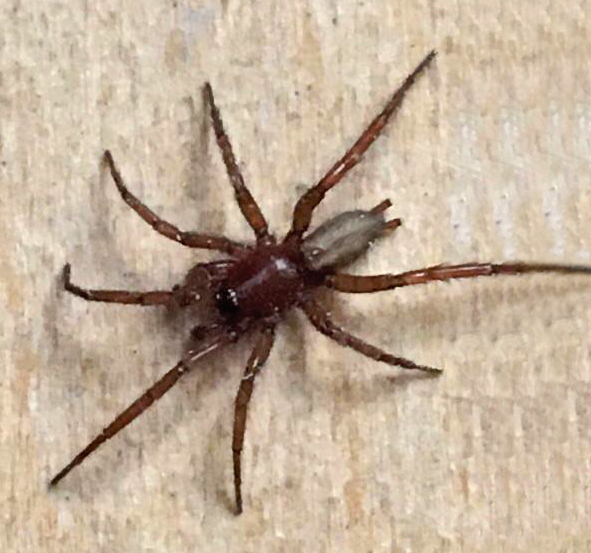

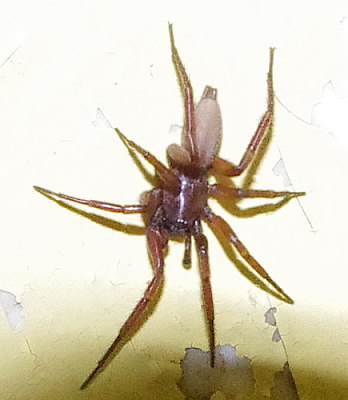

Scientific classification
- Kingdom: Animalia
- Phylum: Arthropoda
- Subphylum: Chelicerata
- Class: Arachnida
- Order: Araneae
- Infraorder: Araneomorphae
- Family: Gnaphosidae
- Genus: Urozelotes
- Species: U. rusticus

Binomial name
- Urozelotes rusticus (L. Koch, 1872)

Synonyms
- Urozelotes synonyms: Melanophora rustica Canestrini & Pavesi, 1870; Drassus razoumowskyi Pavesi, 1873; Drassus cerdo Thorell, 1875; Prosthesima larifuga Simon, 1878; Prosthesima pallida Keyserling, 1878; Drassus agelastus Keyserling, 1891; Prosthesima blanda Banks, 1892; Prosthesima minima Banks, 1892; Prosthesima completa Banks, 1898; Prosthesima lutea F. O. Pickard-Cambridge, 1899; Melanophora pacifica Simon, 1899; Zelotes femoralis Banks, 1904; Melanophora porteri Simon, 1904; Drassodes pater Bösenberg & Strand, 1906; Drassodes rotundifoveatus Bösenberg & Strand, 1906; Scotophaeus blepharotrichus Strand, 1915; Drassyllus blandus Chamberlin, 1922; Drassyllus femoralis Chamberlin, 1922; Drassyllus liopus Chamberlin, 1922; Camillina amnicola Tucker, 1923; Haplodrassus magister Chamberlin, 1933; Drassyllus abdalbus Chamberlin, 1936; Urozelotes cardiogynus Mello-Leitão, 1938; Zelotes scutatus Mello-Leitão, 1939; Drassodes malodes Tikader, 1962; Camillina gigas Schmidt, 1973

= Urozelotes rusticus =

Urozelotes Ground Spider

Species of spider

Urozelotes rusticus is a cosmopolitan spider species in the family Gnaphosidae. It is the type species of the genus Urozelotes.

== Distribution ==
Urozelotes rusticus is probably native to Europe and the Mediterranean region extending to temperate Asia, but has been introduced to both Americas, tropical Africa, Australia, and South Africa.

In South Africa, it occurs across seven provinces: Free State, Gauteng, Mpumalanga, Limpopo, North West, Northern Cape, and Western Cape, at altitudes ranging from 109 to 1,688 m above sea level.

== Habitat and ecology ==
Urozelotes rusticus is a free-living ground dweller. In South Africa, it is found in Fynbos, Grassland, and Savanna biomes. Due to its synanthropic habits, U. rusticus is most frequently found in buildings but also occurs in gardens, pastures, citrus orchards, oak forests, and caves. Its widespread occurrence in human-modified environments has contributed to its global distribution. The species' biology is otherwise largely unknown.

== Description ==
Adults of Urozelotes rusticus have a red-brown prosoma and opisthosoma, with the opisthosoma bearing a dark brown scuticula. The legs are lighter in colouration than the prosoma. The tibial apophysis is distally bent and has a robust tip. Males measure 7–8 mm in body length, while females are somewhat larger, ranging from 7.8 to 10.2 mm.

== Conservation ==
Urozelotes rusticus is listed as Least Concern by the South African National Biodiversity Institute due to its wide global range. The species is protected in four nature reserves in South Africa.

== Taxonomy ==
The species was originally described by L. Koch in 1872 as Prosthesima rustica. It was later transferred to Urozelotes by Platnick & Murphy in 1984, in their revision of the genera Trachyzelotes and Urozelotes, at which time they also synonymised numerous other species with it. The species has probably accumulated the longest list of synonyms of any gnaphosid species due to its widespread distribution and synanthropic habits. It is known from both sexes and has been revised by Platnick and Murphy.
