= Odontodrassus aphanes =

Scientific classification
- Kingdom: Animalia
- Phylum: Arthropoda
- Subphylum: Chelicerata
- Class: Arachnida
- Order: Araneae
- Infraorder: Araneomorphae
- Family: Gnaphosidae
- Genus: Odontodrassus
- Species: O. aphanes

Binomial name
- Odontodrassus aphanes (Thorell, 1897)

Synonyms
- Drassus aphanes Thorell, 1897; Scotophaeus javanus Kulczyński, 1911; Drassodes ciusi Berland, 1924; Odontodrassus javanus Platnick, 1981

Species of spider

Odontodrassus aphanes is a species of spider in the family Gnaphosidae with a wide global distribution.

== Distribution ==
Odontodrassus aphanes has a very wide global distribution from Myanmar to the Philippines, Japan, New Caledonia, and the Salomon Islands. The species has been introduced to Jamaica, South Africa, Seychelles, and various Pacific Islands.

In South Africa, it is recorded from Limpopo Province at locations including Tuinplaas and Blouberg Nature Reserve.

== Habitat and ecology ==
The species is a free-living ground dweller sampled from the Savanna biome. In South Africa, it has been collected at altitudes around sea level to moderate elevations.

== Conservation ==
Odontodrassus aphanes is listed as Least Concern by the South African National Biodiversity Institute due to its very wide global distribution. The species faces no known threats and is protected in the Blouberg Nature Reserve.

== Taxonomy ==
The species was originally described by Tamerlan Thorell in 1897 from Myanmar as Drassus aphanes. It has undergone several taxonomic changes and synonym consolidations. Deeleman-Reinhold (2001) transferred it from Drassodes to Odontodrassus and synonymized Odontodrassus javanus with this species.
