= Litopyllus =

Scientific classification
- Domain: Eukaryota
- Kingdom: Animalia
- Phylum: Arthropoda
- Subphylum: Chelicerata
- Class: Arachnida
- Order: Araneae
- Infraorder: Araneomorphae
- Family: Gnaphosidae
- Genus: Litopyllus; Chamberlin, 1922

Type species
- L. temporarius Chamberlin, 1922

Species
- L. cubanus (Bryant, 1940) – Southern Florida, Bahama Is., Cuba; L. realisticus (Chamberlin, 1924) – Mexico; L. temporarius Chamberlin, 1922 – Eastern USA

Synonyms
- Paramyrmecion Bryant, 1940

Genus of spiders

Litopyllus is a genus of ground spiders that was first described by R. V. Chamberlin in 1922. As of May 2019 it contains only three species: L. cubanus, L. realisticus, and L. temporarius.

== See also ==
- Drassodes
