= Litopyllus cubanus =

Scientific classification
- Kingdom: Animalia
- Phylum: Arthropoda
- Subphylum: Chelicerata
- Class: Arachnida
- Order: Araneae
- Infraorder: Araneomorphae
- Family: Gnaphosidae
- Genus: Litopyllus
- Species: L. cubanus

Binomial name
- Litopyllus cubanus (Bryant, 1940)

Species of spider

Litopyllus cubanus is a species of ground spider in the family Gnaphosidae. It is found in the United States, Bahama Islands, and Cuba.
