= Haplodrassus bechuanicus =

Conservation status
- Least Concern (SANBI Red List)

Scientific classification
- Kingdom: Animalia
- Phylum: Arthropoda
- Subphylum: Chelicerata
- Class: Arachnida
- Order: Araneae
- Infraorder: Araneomorphae
- Family: Gnaphosidae
- Genus: Haplodrassus
- Species: H. bechuanicus

Binomial name
- Haplodrassus bechuanicus (Tucker, 1923)

Synonyms
- Drassodes bechuanicus Tucker, 1923

Species of spider

Haplodrassus bechuanicus is a species of spider in the family Gnaphosidae. It is endemic to southern Africa.

== Etymology ==
The specific name bechuanicus refers to Bechuanaland, the former name of Botswana, where the species was first described.

== Distribution ==
Haplodrassus bechuanicus occurs in three African countries: Botswana, Namibia, and South Africa. Within South Africa, the species is found in four provinces: Free State, Gauteng, KwaZulu-Natal, and Limpopo.

== Habitat and ecology ==
The species is a free-living ground dweller that inhabits the Grassland and Savanna biomes at altitudes ranging from 271 to 1,500 m above sea level.

== Description ==
Haplodrassus bechuanicus is known only from females. From the specimens studied, it has yellowish-brown legs and a light yellowish-brown carapace which becomes darker and redder distally, and black-red chelicerae. Its abdomen bears faint dark spots. The specimen described by Tucker had a carapace of 4.8 mm and a total length of 10.6 mm.

== Conservation ==
Haplodrassus bechuanicus is listed as Least Concern by the South African National Biodiversity Institute due to its wide distribution. The species is protected in two protected areas: Ophathe Game Reserve and Polokwane Nature Reserve.

== Taxonomy ==
The species was originally described by Richard William Ethelbert Tucker in 1923 as Drassodes bechuanicus from Botswana. In 2025, Yuri M. Marusik and Charles R. Haddad transferred the species to the genus Haplodrassus based on morphological characteristics, particularly the flattened retrolateral tibial apophyses positioned dorsally on the male pedipalp.
