= Litopyllus temporarius =

Scientific classification
- Kingdom: Animalia
- Phylum: Arthropoda
- Subphylum: Chelicerata
- Class: Arachnida
- Order: Araneae
- Infraorder: Araneomorphae
- Family: Gnaphosidae
- Genus: Litopyllus
- Species: L. temporarius

Binomial name
- Litopyllus temporarius Chamberlin, 1922

Synonyms
- Litopyllus ambiguus Chamberlin, 1922; Litopyllus liber Fox, 1938; Litopyllus rupicolens Chamberlin & Gertsch, 1940

Species of spider

Litopyllus temporarius is a spider in the family Gnaphosidae ("ground spiders"), in the infraorder Araneomorphae ("true spiders"). It is found in the USA.
