= Drassodes gosiutus =

Scientific classification
- Kingdom: Animalia
- Phylum: Arthropoda
- Subphylum: Chelicerata
- Class: Arachnida
- Order: Araneae
- Infraorder: Araneomorphae
- Family: Gnaphosidae
- Genus: Drassodes
- Species: D. gosiutus

Binomial name
- Drassodes gosiutus Chamberlin, 1919

Synonyms
- Geodrassus phanus Chamberlin, 1925; Geodrassus yavapainus Chamberlin, 1922

Species of spider

Drassodes gosiutus is a species of ground spider in the family Gnaphosidae. It is found in the USA and Canada.
