= Odontodrassus =

Scientific classification
- Kingdom: Animalia
- Phylum: Arthropoda
- Subphylum: Chelicerata
- Class: Arachnida
- Order: Araneae
- Infraorder: Araneomorphae
- Family: Gnaphosidae
- Genus: Odontodrassus; Jézéquel, 1965

Type species
- O. nigritibialis Jézéquel, 1965

Species
- 8, see text

Genus of spiders

Odontodrassus is a genus of ground spiders that was first described by J.-F. Jézéquel in 1965.

== Species ==
As of September 2025, this genus includes nine species:

- Odontodrassus aphanes (Thorell, 1897) – Myanmar, Philippines, Japan, New Caledonia, Salomon Islands. Introduced to Jamaica, South Africa, Seychelles, Pacific Islands
- Odontodrassus aravaensis Levy, 1999 – Egypt, Israel, Iraq
- Odontodrassus bicolor Jézéquel, 1965 – Ivory Coast
- Odontodrassus ereptor (Purcell, 1907) – South Africa
- Odontodrassus hondoensis (Saito, 1939) – Russia (Far East), China, Korea, Japan
- Odontodrassus mundulus (O. Pickard-Cambridge, 1872) – North Africa, Israel, Jordan, Iraq, Iran
- Odontodrassus muralis Deeleman-Reinhold, 2001 – Thailand, China, Indonesia (Sulawesi, Lombok)
- Odontodrassus nigritibialis Jézéquel, 1965 – Ivory Coast (type species)
- Odontodrassus yunnanensis (Schenkel, 1963) – China
