= Haplodrassus helenae =

Helena's Drassodes Ground Spider

Conservation status
- Least Concern (SANBI Red List)

Scientific classification
- Kingdom: Animalia
- Phylum: Arthropoda
- Subphylum: Chelicerata
- Class: Arachnida
- Order: Araneae
- Infraorder: Araneomorphae
- Family: Gnaphosidae
- Genus: Haplodrassus
- Species: H. helenae

Binomial name
- Haplodrassus helenae (Purcell, 1907)

Synonyms
- Drassodes helenae Purcell, 1907

Species of spider

Haplodrassus helenae is a species of spider in the family Gnaphosidae. It is endemic to South Africa.

== Etymology ==
The specific name helenae likely refers to St Helena Bay in the Western Cape, where the species was first described.

== Distribution ==
Haplodrassus helenae is found across four provinces of South Africa: Gauteng, Limpopo, Western Cape, and Northern Cape.

== Habitat and ecology ==
The species is a free-living ground dweller that inhabits the Fynbos, Grassland, and Savanna biomes at altitudes ranging from 635 to 1,730 m above sea level. It was collected in high numbers from the Springbok Flats area.

== Description ==
Haplodrassus helenae is known only from males.

== Conservation ==
Haplodrassus helenae is listed as Least Concern by the South African National Biodiversity Institute due to its wide geographical range, despite being known from only one sex. The species is protected in Klipriviersberg Nature Reserve and Augrabies National Park.

== Taxonomy ==
The species was originally described by W. F. Purcell in 1907 as Drassodes helenae. In 2025, Yuri M. Marusik and Charles R. Haddad transferred the species to the genus Haplodrassus.
