= Haplodrassus solitarius =

Conservation status
- Least Concern (SANBI Red List)

Scientific classification
- Kingdom: Animalia
- Phylum: Arthropoda
- Subphylum: Chelicerata
- Class: Arachnida
- Order: Araneae
- Infraorder: Araneomorphae
- Family: Gnaphosidae
- Genus: Haplodrassus
- Species: H. solitarius

Binomial name
- Haplodrassus solitarius (Purcell, 1907)

Synonyms
- Drassodes solitarius Purcell, 1907

Species of spider

Haplodrassus solitarius is a species of spider in the family Gnaphosidae. It occurs in southern Africa. Haplodrassus solitarius is known only from females.

== Distribution ==
Haplodrassus solitarius is found in Zimbabwe and South Africa. Within South Africa, it is recorded from seven provinces, Gauteng, KwaZulu-Natal, Limpopo, Mpumalanga, North West, Northern Cape, and Western Cape.

== Habitat and ecology ==
The species is a free-living ground dweller that inhabits the Fynbos, Grassland, Nama Karoo, Savanna, and Succulent Karoo biomes at altitudes ranging from 78 to 2,985 m above sea level.

== Conservation ==
Haplodrassus solitarius is listed as Least Concern by the South African National Biodiversity Institute due to its wide geographical range, despite being known from only one sex. The species is protected in five protected areas including Nyala Game Reserve, Polokwane Nature Reserve, Rustenburg Nature Reserve, Benfontein Game Reserve, Cederberg Wilderness Area, and Namaqua National Park.

== Taxonomy ==
The species was originally described by W. F. Purcell in 1907 as Drassodes solitarius from Hanover in the Northern Cape. In 2025, Yuri M. Marusik and Charles R. Haddad transferred the species to the genus Haplodrassus.

== See also ==
- Glossary of spider terms
