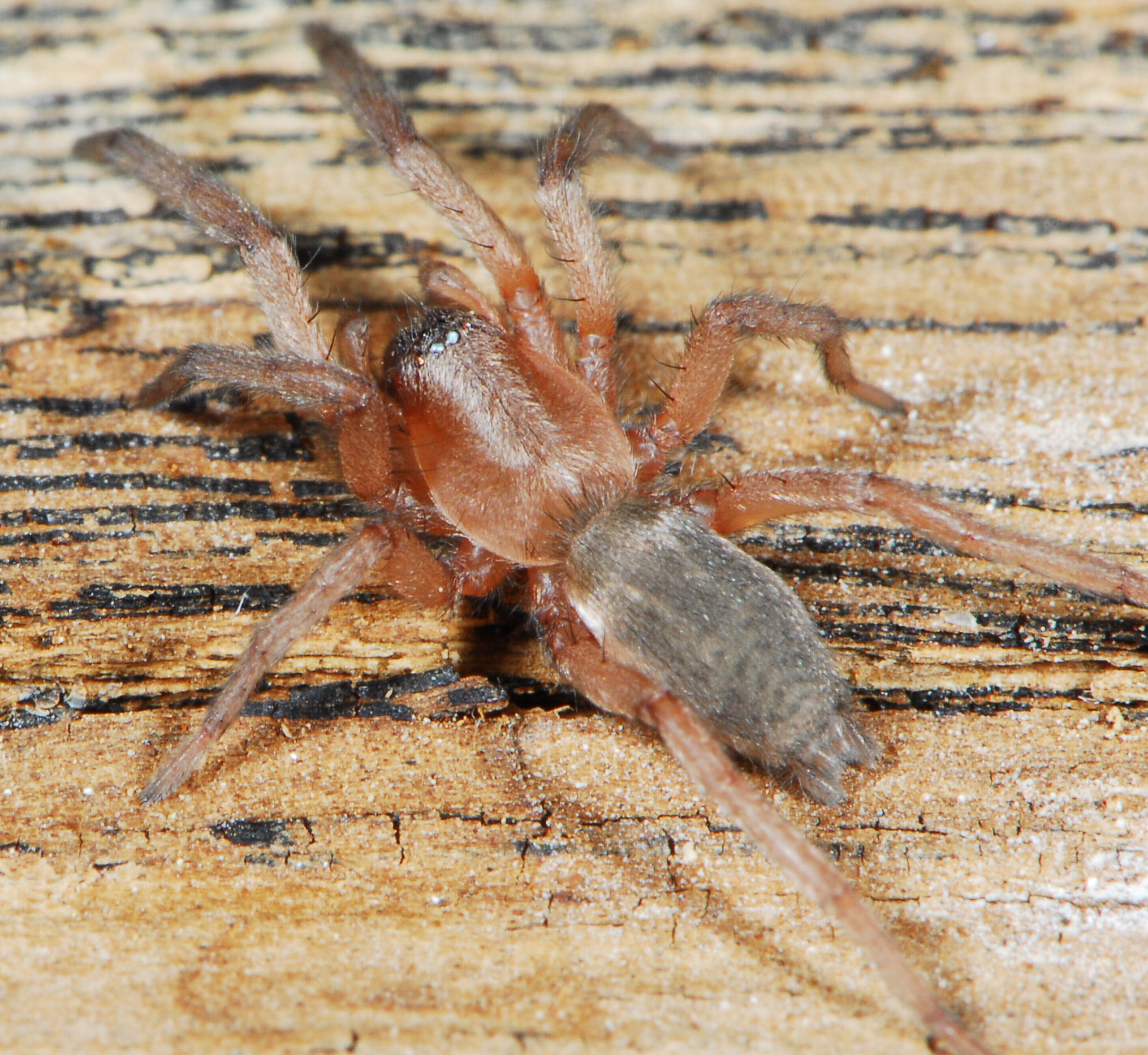
- Female
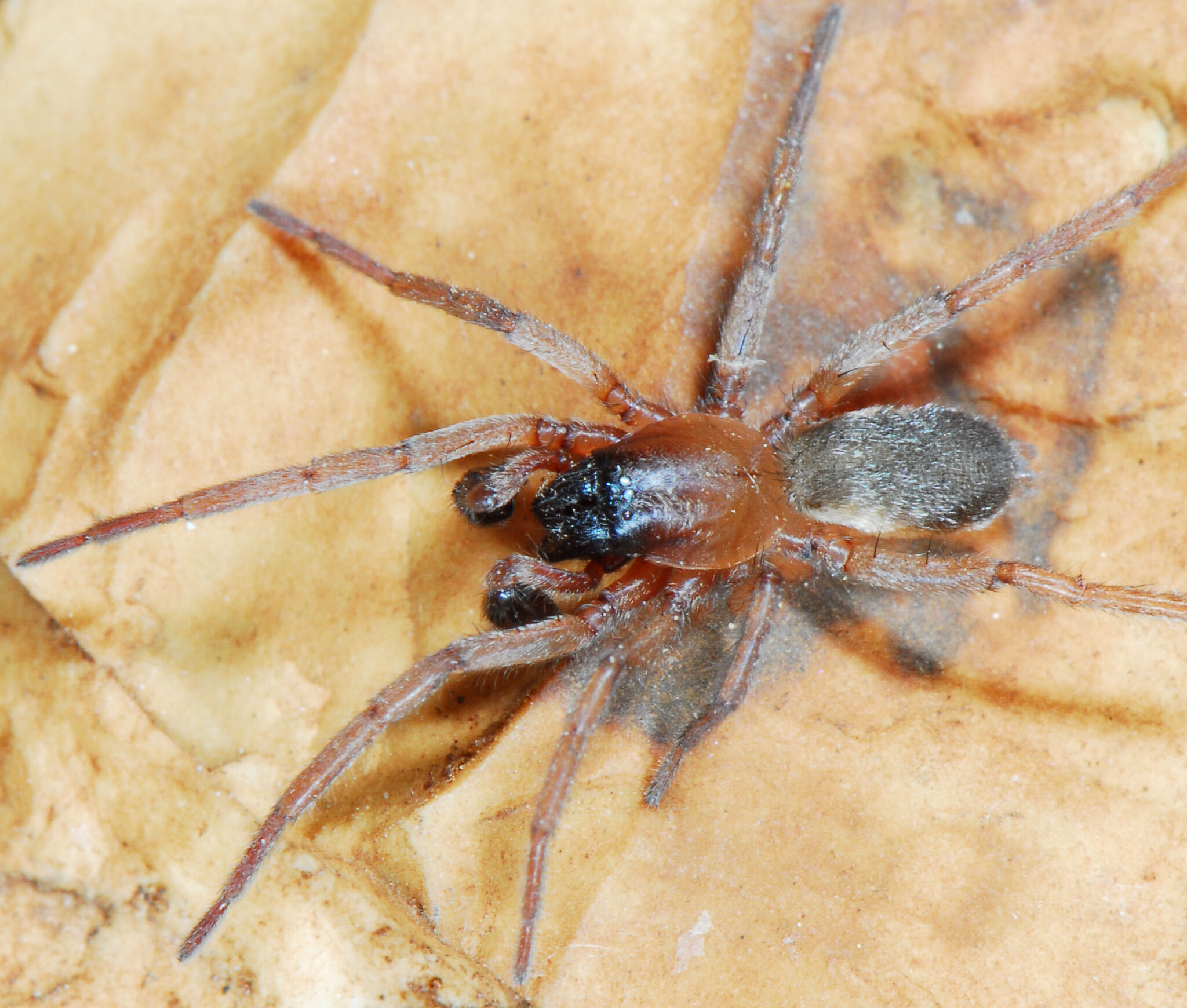
- Male

Scientific classification
- Kingdom: Animalia
- Phylum: Arthropoda
- Subphylum: Chelicerata
- Class: Arachnida
- Order: Araneae
- Infraorder: Araneomorphae
- Family: Gnaphosidae
- Genus: Haplodrassus
- Species: H. stationis

Binomial name
- Haplodrassus stationis (Tucker, 1923)

Synonyms
- Drassodes stationis Tucker, 1923

= Haplodrassus stationis =

Species of spider

Haplodrassus stationis is a species of spider in the family Gnaphosidae. It is endemic to South Africa.

== Distribution ==
Haplodrassus stationis is found across eight provinces of South Africa: Eastern Cape, Free State, Gauteng, KwaZulu-Natal, Limpopo, Mpumalanga, Northern Cape, and Western Cape.

== Habitat and ecology ==
The species is a free-living ground dweller that inhabits the Fynbos, Grassland, Nama Karoo, and Savanna biomes at altitudes ranging from 54 to 2,272 m above sea level. It has also been collected from cabbage fields.

== Description ==
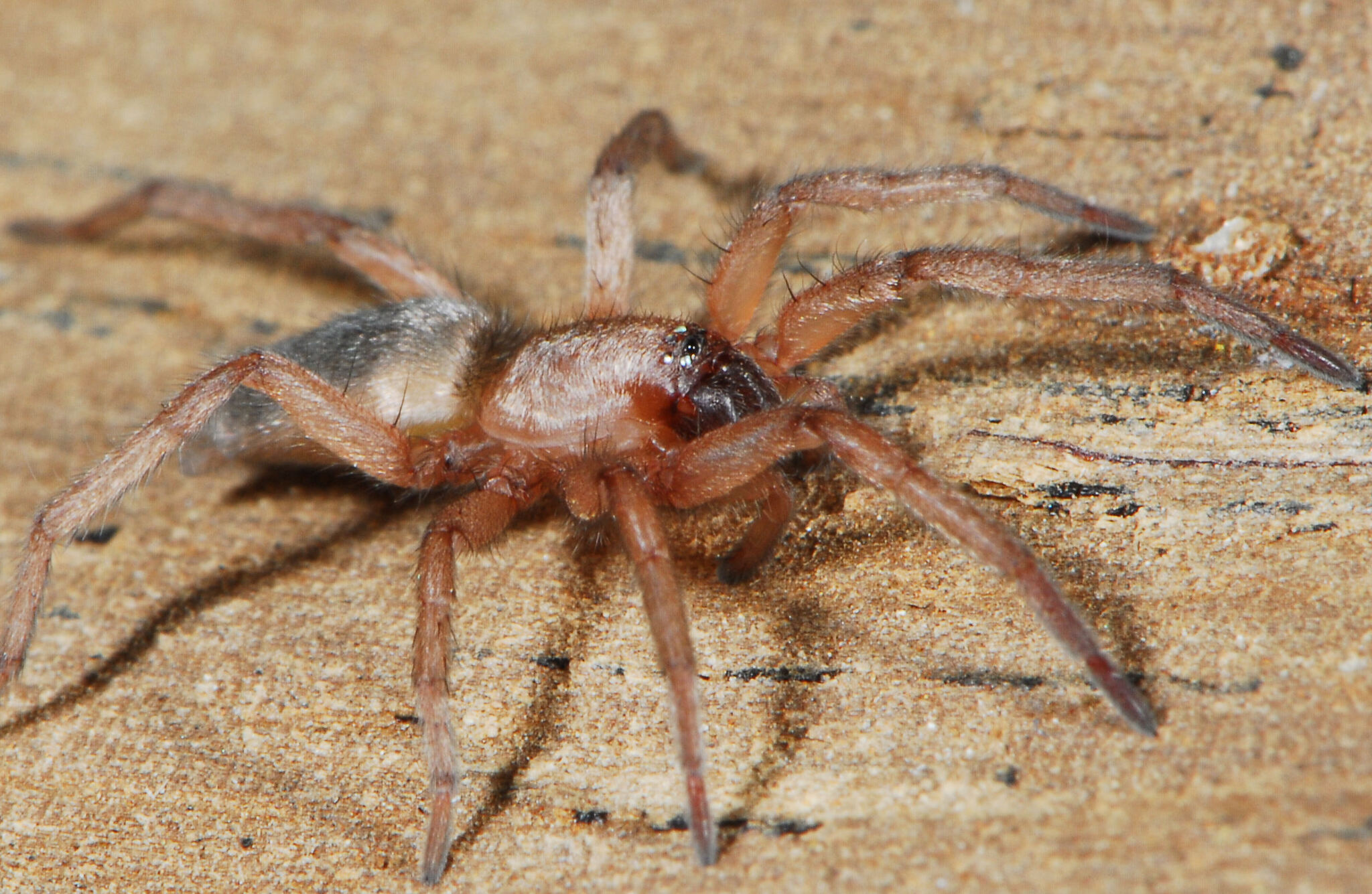
female

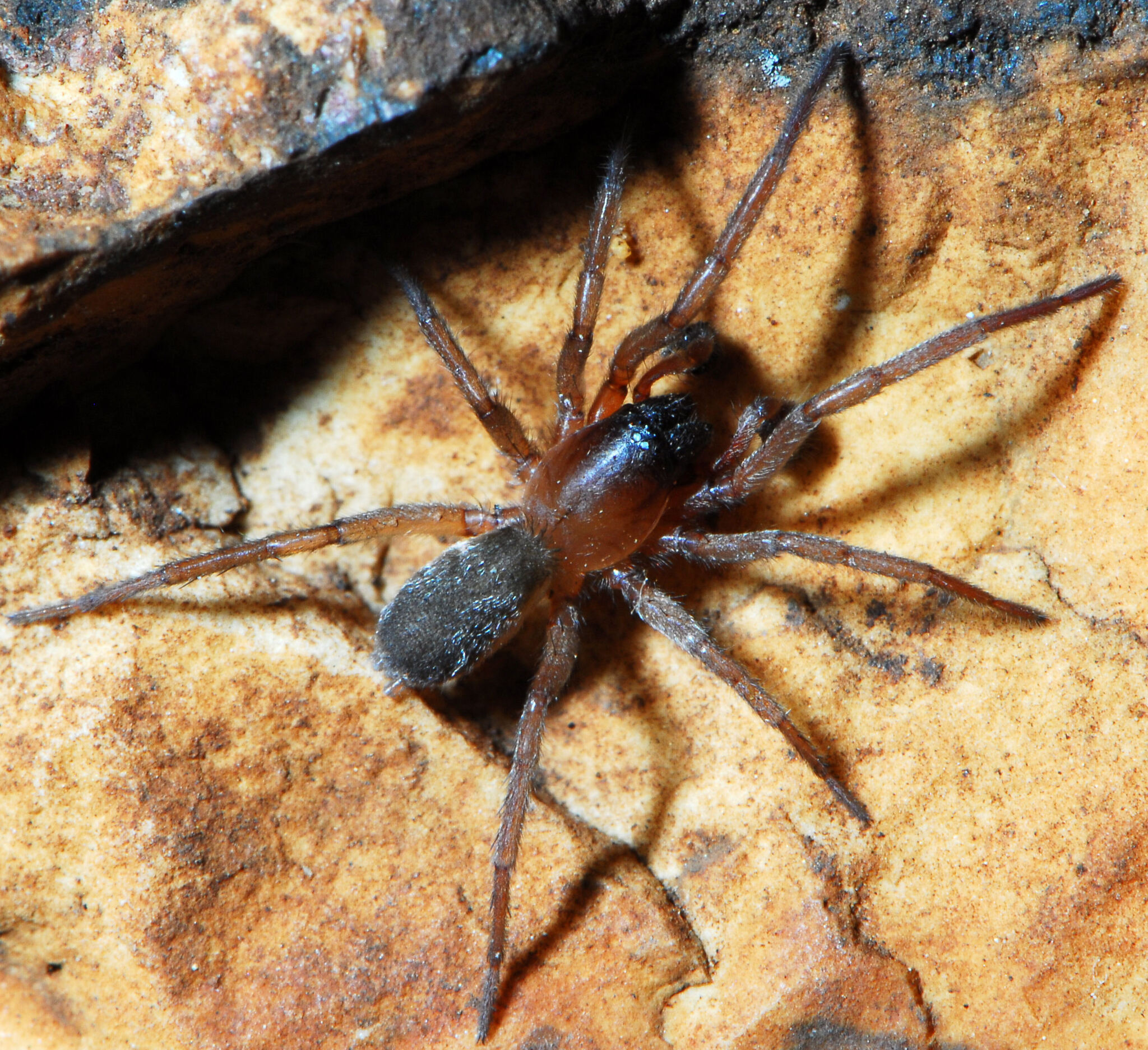
male

Haplodrassus stationis is known from both sexes, though the female is undescribed as of 2025.

== Conservation ==
Haplodrassus stationis is listed as Least Concern by the South African National Biodiversity Institute due to its wide geographical range, despite being known primarily from one sex. The species is protected in more than ten protected areas.

== Taxonomy ==
The species was originally described by R.W.E. Tucker in 1923 as Drassodes stationis from Hout Bay in the Western Cape. In 2025, Yuri M. Marusik and Charles R. Haddad transferred the species to the genus Haplodrassus.
