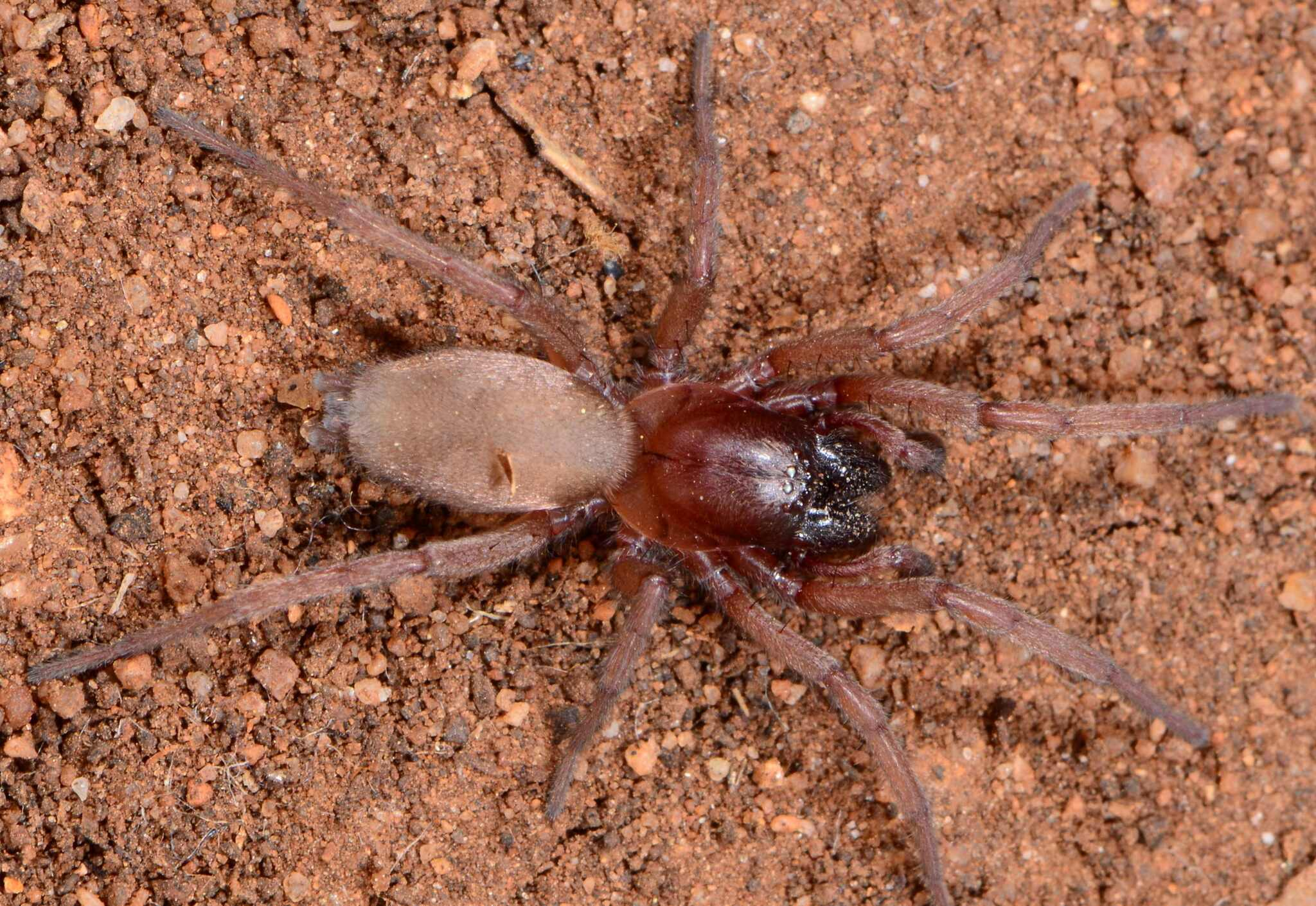
- male
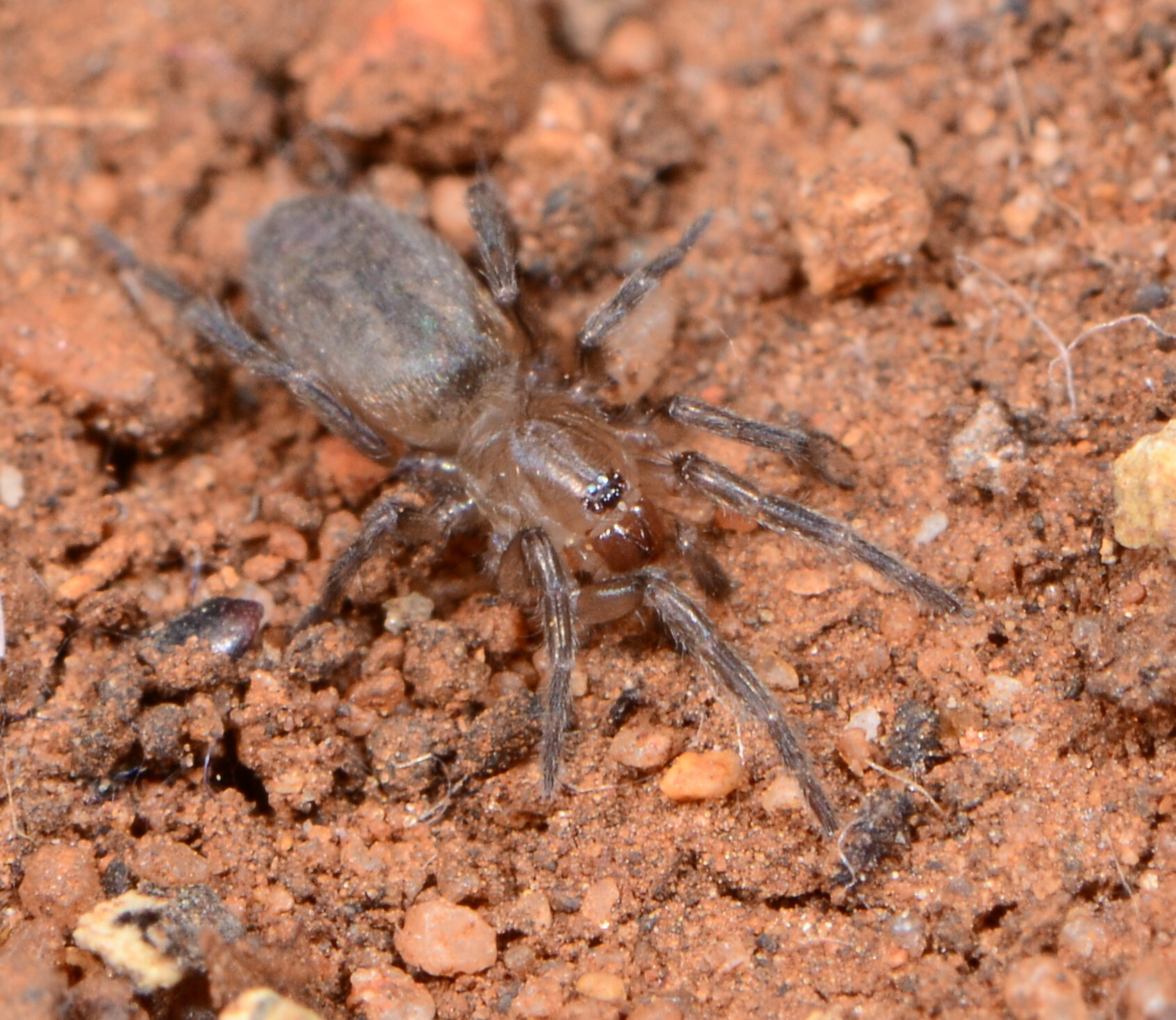
- juvenile female

Scientific classification
- Kingdom: Animalia
- Phylum: Arthropoda
- Subphylum: Chelicerata
- Class: Arachnida
- Order: Araneae
- Infraorder: Araneomorphae
- Family: Gnaphosidae
- Genus: Haplodrassus
- Species: H. lophognathus

Binomial name
- Haplodrassus lophognathus (Purcell, 1907)

Synonyms
- Drassodes lophognathus Purcell, 1907

= Haplodrassus lophognathus =

Species of spider

Haplodrassus lophognathus is a species of spider in the family Gnaphosidae. It is endemic to South Africa.

== Distribution ==
Haplodrassus lophognathus is widespread across seven provinces of South Africa: Eastern Cape, Free State, Gauteng, KwaZulu-Natal, Limpopo, Northern Cape, and Western Cape.

== Habitat and ecology ==
The species is a free-living ground dweller that inhabits all the floral biomes except the Desert, Indian Ocean Coast Belt, and Forest biomes, at altitudes ranging from 14 to 2,985 m above sea level. It has also been collected from macadamia, pear, and pistachio orchards.

== Description ==
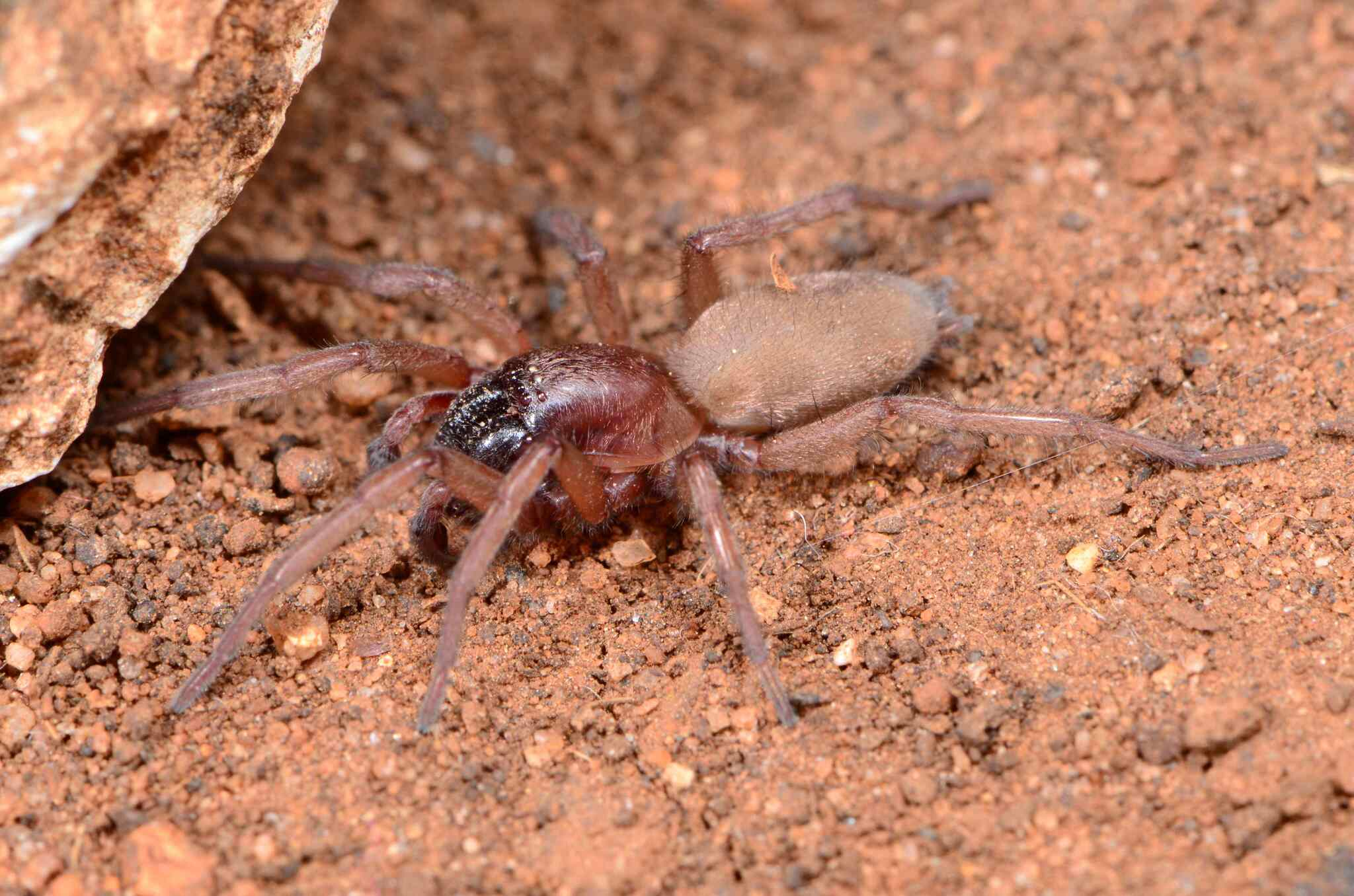
male

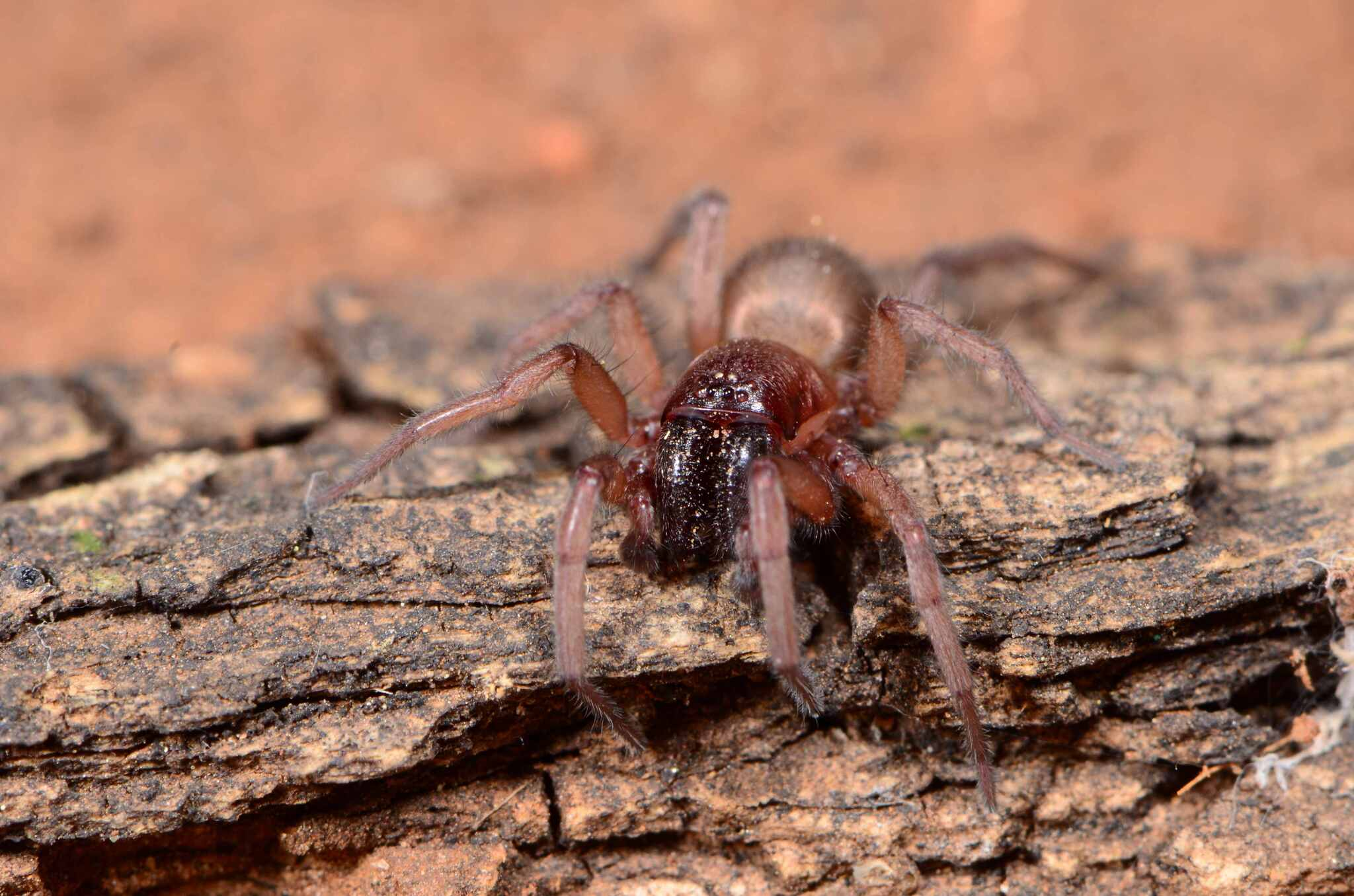
male

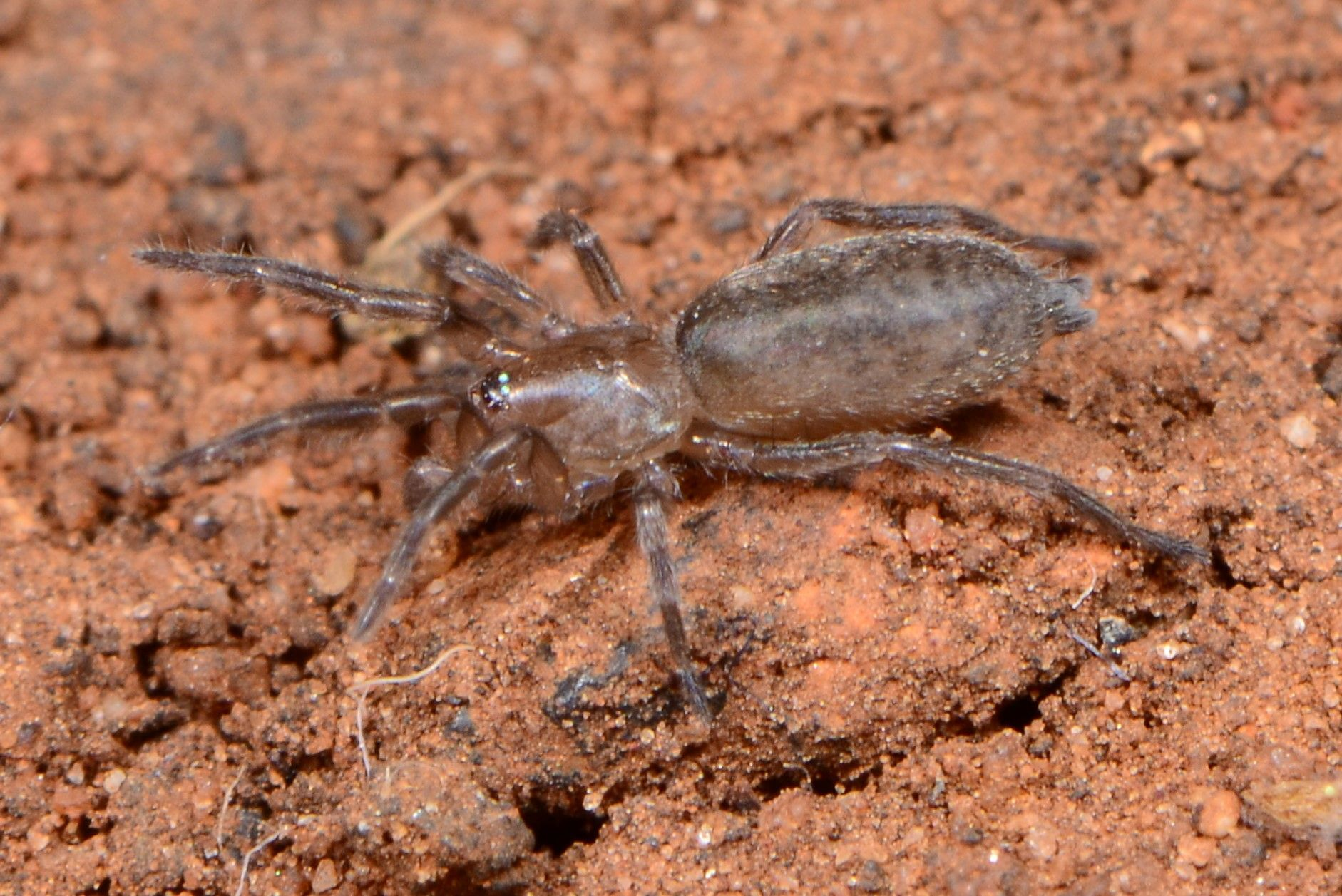
juvenile female

== Conservation ==
Haplodrassus lophognathus is listed as Least Concern by the South African National Biodiversity Institute due to its wide distribution. The species is protected in numerous areas including Klipriviersberg Nature Reserve, Table Mountain National Park, iSimangaliso Wetland Park, uMkhuze Game Reserve, Benfontein Game Reserve, Cederberg Wilderness Area, Karoo National Park, and Witteberg Nature Reserve.

== Taxonomy ==
The species was originally described by W. F. Purcell in 1907 as Drassodes lophognathus from Devils Peak, Table Mountain National Park. In 2025, Yuri M. Marusik and Charles R. Haddad transferred the species to the genus Haplodrassus.
