= Haplodrassus dregei =

Scientific classification
- Kingdom: Animalia
- Phylum: Arthropoda
- Subphylum: Chelicerata
- Class: Arachnida
- Order: Araneae
- Infraorder: Araneomorphae
- Family: Gnaphosidae
- Genus: Haplodrassus
- Species: H. dregei

Binomial name
- Haplodrassus dregei (Purcell, 1907)

Synonyms
- Drassodes dregei Purcell, 1907

Species of spider

Haplodrassus dregei is a species of spider in the family Gnaphosidae. It is endemic to South Africa.

== Distribution ==
Haplodrassus dregei is found only in the Eastern Cape province of South Africa, specifically at the type locality of Port Elizabeth.

== Habitat and ecology ==
The species is a free-living ground dweller that inhabits the Thicket biome at an altitude of 7 m above sea level.

== Description ==
Haplodrassus dregei is known only from females.

== Conservation ==
Haplodrassus dregei is listed as Data Deficient due to taxonomic reasons. More sampling is needed to collect male specimens and determine the species' full range.

== Taxonomy ==
The species was originally described by W. F. Purcell in 1907 as Drassodes dregei. In 2025, Yuri M. Marusik and Charles R. Haddad transferred the species to the genus Haplodrassus.
