= Drassodes saccatus =

Conservation status
- Secure (NatureServe)

Scientific classification
- Kingdom: Animalia
- Phylum: Arthropoda
- Subphylum: Chelicerata
- Class: Arachnida
- Order: Araneae
- Infraorder: Araneomorphae
- Family: Gnaphosidae
- Genus: Drassodes
- Species: D. saccatus

Binomial name
- Drassodes saccatus (Emerton, 1890)

Synonyms
- Drassodes celes Chamberlin, 1919; Drassodes centralis Chamberlin, 1919; Drassodes robinsoni F. O. P.-Cambridge, 1899

Species of spider

Drassodes saccatus is a species of ground spiders in the family Gnaphosidae. It is found in North America.
