= Haplodrassus tortuosus =

Scientific classification
- Kingdom: Animalia
- Phylum: Arthropoda
- Subphylum: Chelicerata
- Class: Arachnida
- Order: Araneae
- Infraorder: Araneomorphae
- Family: Gnaphosidae
- Genus: Haplodrassus
- Species: H. tortuosus

Binomial name
- Haplodrassus tortuosus (Tucker, 1923)

Synonyms
- Drassodes tortuosus Tucker, 1923

Species of spider

Haplodrassus tortuosus is a species of spider in the family Gnaphosidae. It is endemic to South Africa.

== Distribution ==
Haplodrassus tortuosus is found only in the KwaZulu-Natal province of South Africa, specifically at the type locality of Howick.

== Habitat and ecology ==
The species is a free-living ground dweller that inhabits the Grassland biome at an altitude of 1,127 m above sea level.

== Description ==
Haplodrassus tortuosus is known only from females.

== Conservation ==
Haplodrassus tortuosus is listed as Data Deficient due to taxonomic reasons. More sampling is needed to collect male specimens and determine the species' full range.

== Taxonomy ==
The species was originally described by R.W.E. Tucker in 1923 as Drassodes tortuosus. In 2025, Yuri M. Marusik and Charles R. Haddad transferred the species to the genus Haplodrassus.
