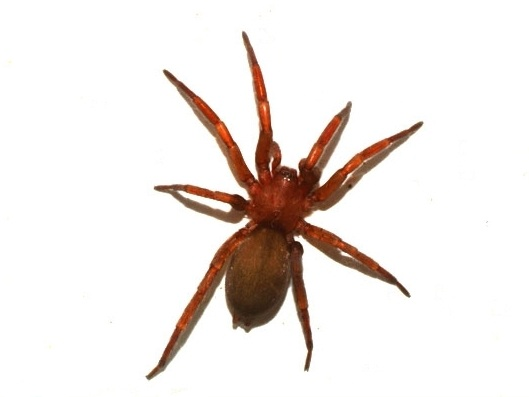

Scientific classification
- Domain: Eukaryota
- Kingdom: Animalia
- Phylum: Arthropoda
- Subphylum: Chelicerata
- Class: Arachnida
- Order: Araneae
- Infraorder: Araneomorphae
- Family: Gnaphosidae
- Genus: Haplodrassus
- Species: H. signifer

Binomial name
- Haplodrassus signifer (C. L. Koch, 1839)

Synonyms
- Drassus signifer C. L. Koch, 1839

= Haplodrassus signifer =

Species of spider

Haplodrassus signifer is a species of ground spider in the family Gnaphosidae. It is found in North America, Europe, Turkey, Israel, Caucasus, a range from Russia to Central Asia, China, and Korea.

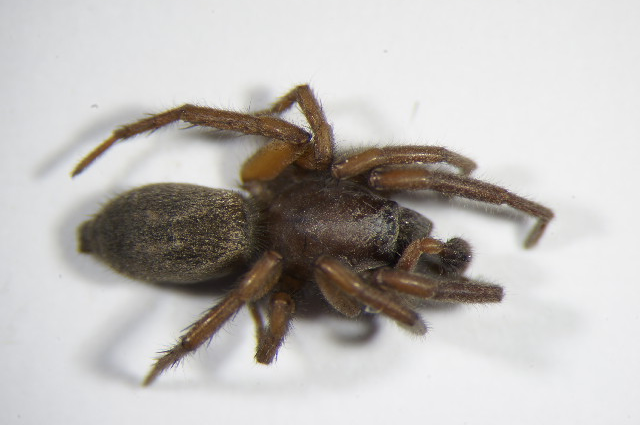
