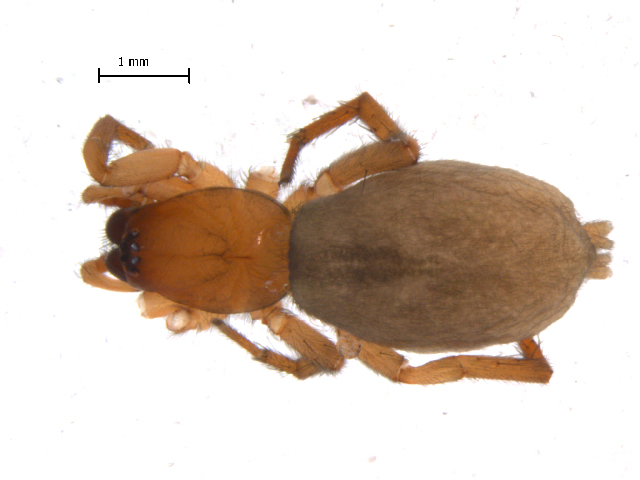

Scientific classification
- Domain: Eukaryota
- Kingdom: Animalia
- Phylum: Arthropoda
- Subphylum: Chelicerata
- Class: Arachnida
- Order: Araneae
- Infraorder: Araneomorphae
- Family: Gnaphosidae
- Genus: Haplodrassus
- Species: H. bicornis

Binomial name
- Haplodrassus bicornis (Emerton, 1909)

Synonyms
- Drassus bicornis Emerton, 1909; Haplodrassus admes Chamberlin, 1922; Haplodrassus uncifer Chamberlin, 1936

= Haplodrassus bicornis =

Species of spider

Haplodrassus bicornis is a species of ground spider in the family Gnaphosidae. It is found in the United States and Canada.
