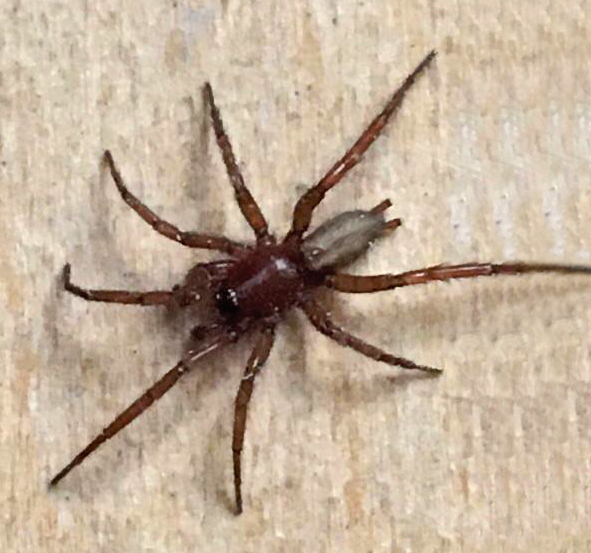
- U. rusticus
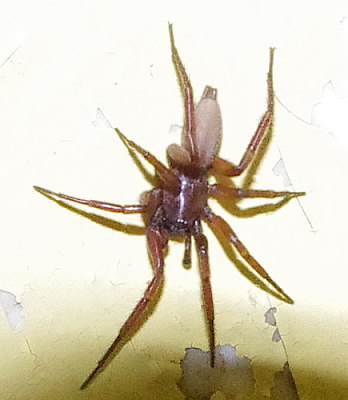
- U. rusticus

Scientific classification
- Kingdom: Animalia
- Phylum: Arthropoda
- Subphylum: Chelicerata
- Class: Arachnida
- Order: Araneae
- Infraorder: Araneomorphae
- Family: Gnaphosidae
- Genus: Urozelotes; Mello-Leitão, 1938

Type species
- U. rusticus (L. Koch, 1872)

Species
- 5, see text

= Urozelotes =

Genus of spiders

Urozelotes is a genus of ground spiders that was first described by Cândido Firmino de Mello-Leitão in 1938.

== Description ==
Total length is 5-8 mm. The carapace is oval in dorsal view, widest between coxae II and III, truncated anteriorly and posteriorly, and abruptly narrowed opposite the pedipalps. It is light orange, darkest anteriorly, with numerous long, thin, black setae along the midline and edge of the posterior declivity. The cephalic area is flattened with a long, longitudinal thoracic groove. The anterior eye row is very slightly recurved, while the posterior row is very slightly procurved. The legs are uniformly light orange, with all tarsi and anterior metatarsi lightly scopulate.

== Species ==
As of September 2025, this genus includes six species:

- Urozelotes clarus (Wunderlich, 2023) – Portugal
- Urozelotes kabenge FitzPatrick, 2005 – Zambia
- Urozelotes mysticus Platnick & Murphy, 1984 – Italy
- Urozelotes patulusus Sankaran & Sebastian, 2018 – India
- Urozelotes rusticus (L. Koch, 1872) – Probably native to Europe/Mediterranean, temperate Asia. Introduced to both Americas, tropical Africa, Australia (type species)
- Urozelotes trifidus Tuneva, 2003 – France, Russia (Europe)
