= Haplodrassus hiemalis =

Scientific classification
- Domain: Eukaryota
- Kingdom: Animalia
- Phylum: Arthropoda
- Subphylum: Chelicerata
- Class: Arachnida
- Order: Araneae
- Infraorder: Araneomorphae
- Family: Gnaphosidae
- Genus: Haplodrassus
- Species: H. hiemalis

Binomial name
- Haplodrassus hiemalis (Emerton, 1909)

Synonyms
- Drassus hiemalis Emerton, 1909

Species of spider

Haplodrassus hiemalis is a species of ground spider in the family Gnaphosidae. It is found in North America and a range from Russia (European to Far East).
