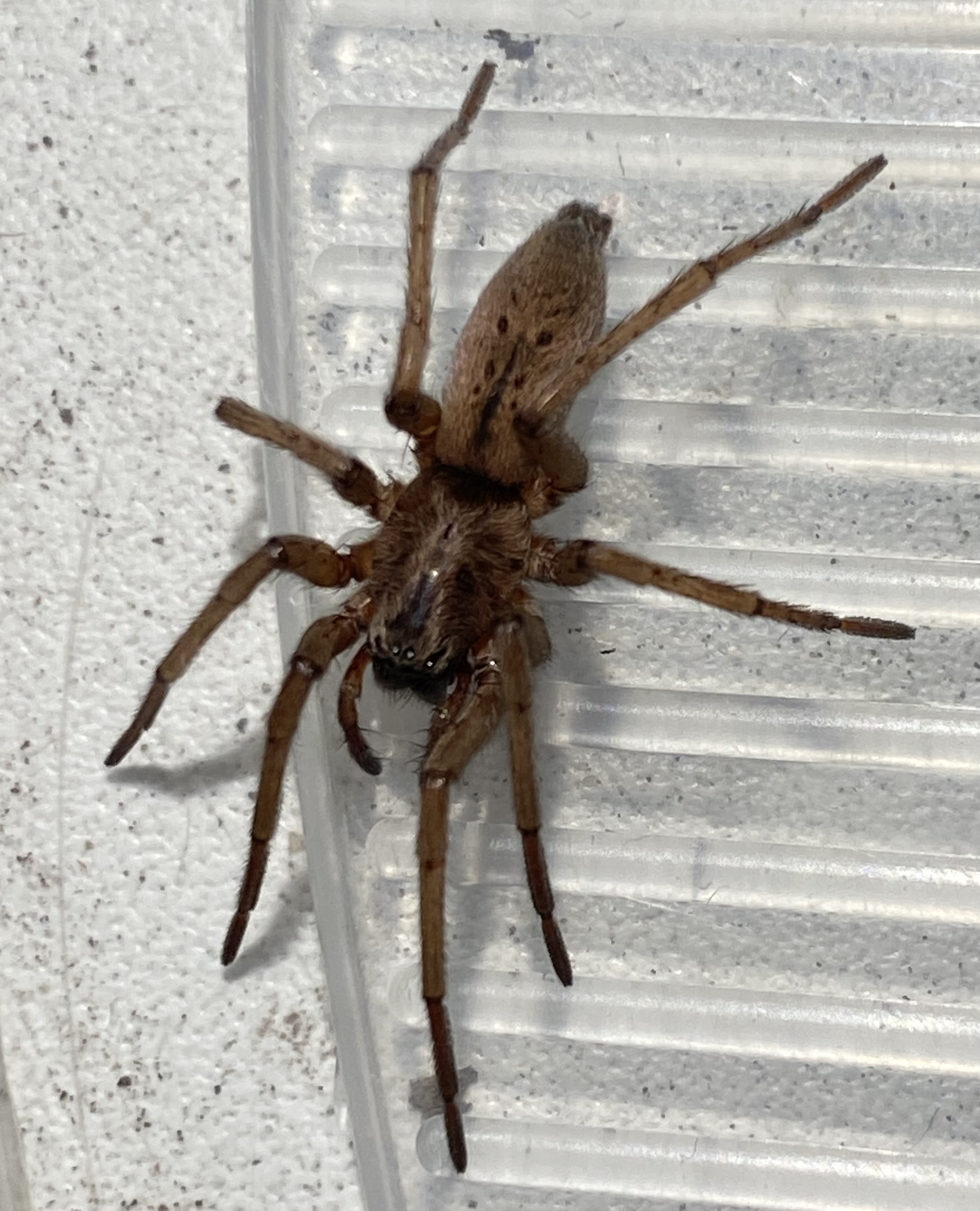

Conservation status
- Secure (NatureServe)

Scientific classification
- Kingdom: Animalia
- Phylum: Arthropoda
- Subphylum: Chelicerata
- Class: Arachnida
- Order: Araneae
- Infraorder: Araneomorphae
- Family: Gnaphosidae
- Genus: Drassodes
- Species: D. neglectus

Binomial name
- Drassodes neglectus (Keyserling, 1887)

Synonyms
- Drassus humilis Banks, 1892; Drassus inornatus Banks, 1895; Drassus neglectus Keyserling, 1887

= Drassodes neglectus =

Species of spider

Drassodes neglectus is a species of ground spider in the family Gnaphosidae. It is found in Russia (Far East) and North America.
