= Haplodrassus tesselatus =

Conservation status
- Least Concern (SANBI Red List)

Scientific classification
- Kingdom: Animalia
- Phylum: Arthropoda
- Subphylum: Chelicerata
- Class: Arachnida
- Order: Araneae
- Infraorder: Araneomorphae
- Family: Gnaphosidae
- Genus: Haplodrassus
- Species: H. tesselatus

Binomial name
- Haplodrassus tesselatus (Purcell, 1907)

Synonyms
- Drassodes tesselatus Purcell, 1907

Species of spider

Haplodrassus tesselatus (formerly Drassodes tesselatus) is a species of spider in the family Gnaphosidae. It is endemic to South Africa.

== Distribution ==
Haplodrassus tesselatus is found in three provinces of South Africa, Eastern Cape, Free State, and Northern Cape.

== Habitat and ecology ==
The species is a free-living ground dweller that inhabits the Grassland biome at altitudes ranging from 1,242 to 1,462 m above sea level.

== Description ==
Haplodrassus tesselatus is known from both sexes, and the shape of the epigyne and male palp are typical of Haplodrassus

== Conservation ==
Haplodrassus tesselatus is listed as Least Concern by the South African National Biodiversity Institute. Although requiring taxonomic revision, current records are from an area that is not heavily transformed and the species is likely under-sampled.

== Taxonomy ==
The species was originally described by W. F. Purcell in 1907 as Drassodes tesselatus from Hanover. In 2025, Yuri M. Marusik and Charles R. Haddad transferred the species to the genus Haplodrassus.
