= Odontodrassus ereptor =

Conservation status
- Least Concern (SANBI Red List)

Scientific classification
- Kingdom: Animalia
- Phylum: Arthropoda
- Subphylum: Chelicerata
- Class: Arachnida
- Order: Araneae
- Infraorder: Araneomorphae
- Family: Gnaphosidae
- Genus: Odontodrassus
- Species: O. ereptor

Binomial name
- Odontodrassus ereptor (Purcell, 1907)

Synonyms
- Drassodes ereptor Purcell, 1907

Species of spider

Odontodrassus ereptor is a species of spider in the family Gnaphosidae. It is endemic to South Africa.

== Distribution ==
Odontodrassus ereptor is found across six provinces of South Africa: Free State, Gauteng, KwaZulu-Natal, Northern Cape, North West, and Western Cape.

== Habitat and ecology ==
The species is a free-living ground dweller that inhabits the Fynbos, Grassland, Savanna, and Succulent Karoo biomes at altitudes ranging from 9 to 1,193 m above sea level. It has also been collected from pistachio orchards.

== Description ==
Odontodrassus ereptor is known from both sexes.

== Conservation ==
Odontodrassus ereptor is listed as Least Concern by the South African National Biodiversity Institute due to its wide distribution. The species is protected in ten protected areas including Ndumo Game Reserve, De Hoop Nature Reserve, Swartberg Nature Reserve, Anysberg Nature Reserve, Cederberg Wilderness Area, Table Mountain National Park, and Witteberg Nature Reserve.

== Taxonomy ==
The species was originally described by W. F. Purcell in 1907 as Drassodes ereptor. In 2025, Yuri M. Marusik and Charles R. Haddad transferred the species to the genus Odontodrassus.
