= Haplodrassus masculus =

Conservation status
- Least Concern (SANBI Red List)

Scientific classification
- Kingdom: Animalia
- Phylum: Arthropoda
- Subphylum: Chelicerata
- Class: Arachnida
- Order: Araneae
- Infraorder: Araneomorphae
- Family: Gnaphosidae
- Genus: Haplodrassus
- Species: H. masculus

Binomial name
- Haplodrassus masculus (Tucker, 1923)

Synonyms
- Drassodes masculus Tucker, 1923

Species of spider

Haplodrassus masculus is a species of spider in the family Gnaphosidae. It occurs in southern Africa.

== Distribution ==
Haplodrassus masculus is found in Zimbabwe and South Africa. Within South Africa, it is recorded from the Free State and Mpumalanga provinces.

== Habitat and ecology ==
The species is a free-living ground dweller that inhabits the grassland and savanna biomes at altitudes ranging from 285 to 1,385 m above sea level.

== Description ==
Haplodrassus masculus is known only from males.

== Conservation ==
Haplodrassus masculus is listed as Least Concern by the South African National Biodiversity Institute due to its wide distribution in southern Africa. The species is protected in Soetdoring Nature Reserve and Kruger National Park.

== Taxonomy ==
The species was originally described by R.W.E. Tucker in 1923 as Drassodes masculus from Zimbabwe. In 2025, Yuri M. Marusik and Charles R. Haddad transferred the species to the genus Haplodrassus.
