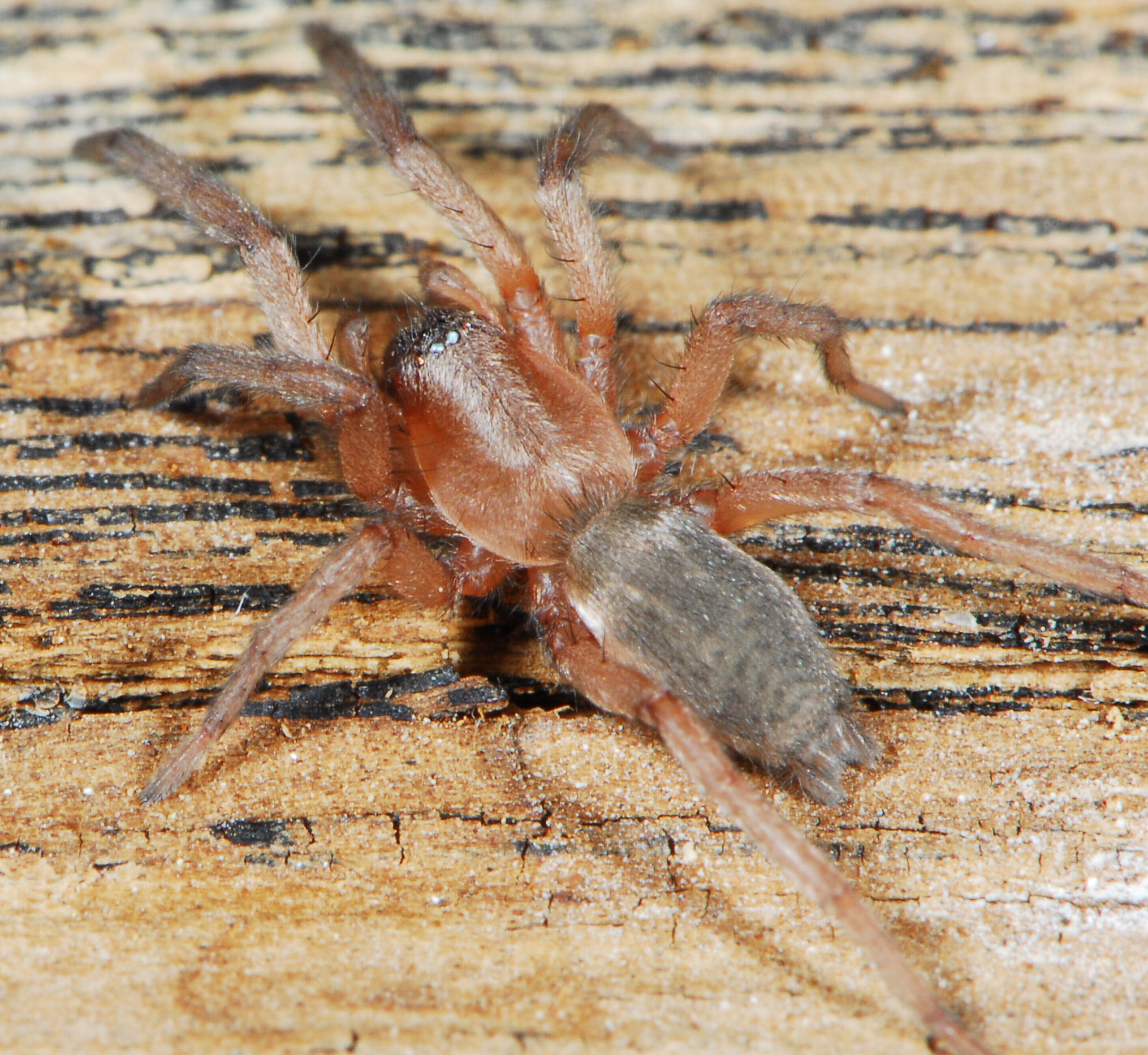
- Female H. stationis
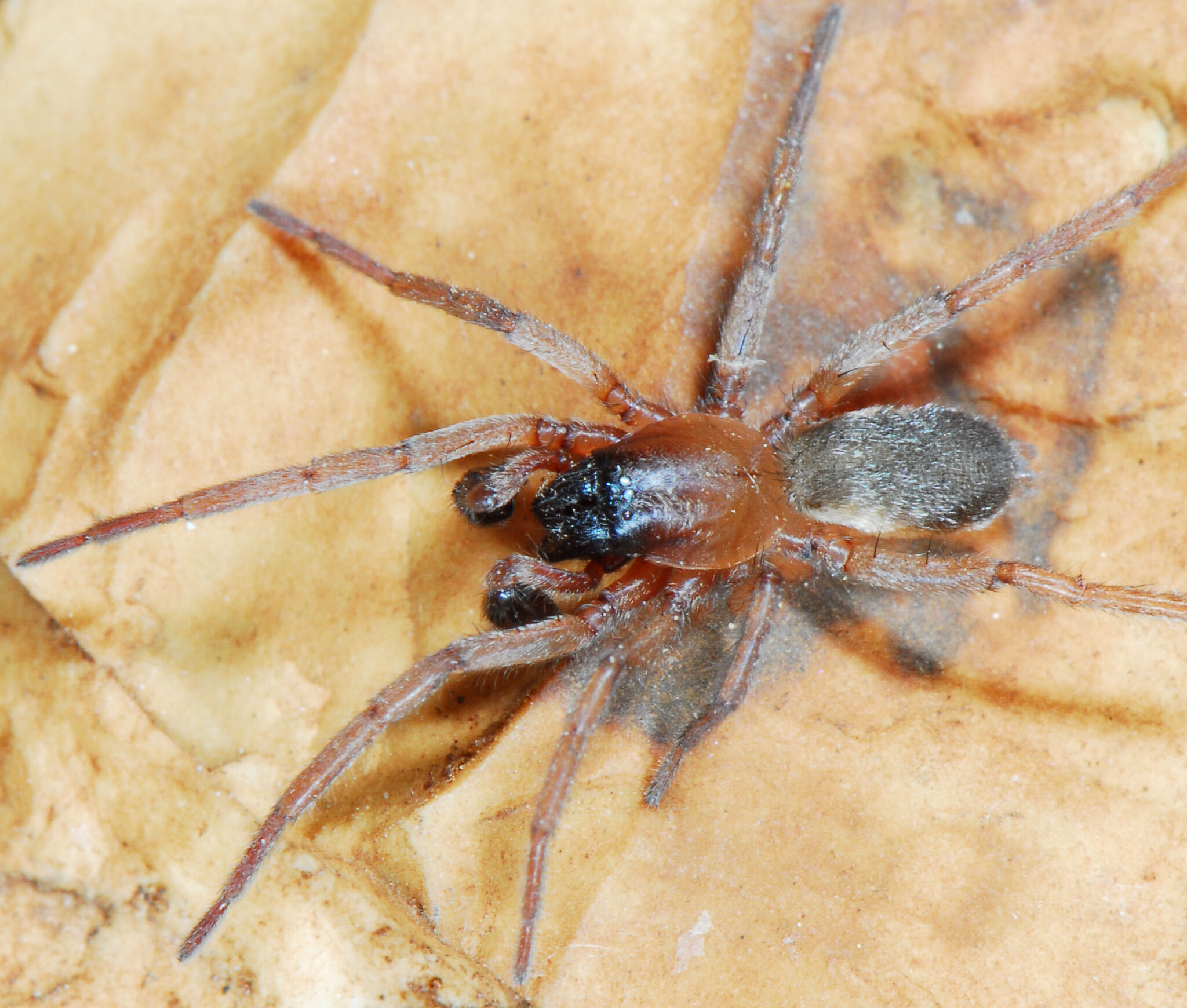
- Male H. stationis

Scientific classification
- Kingdom: Animalia
- Phylum: Arthropoda
- Subphylum: Chelicerata
- Class: Arachnida
- Order: Araneae
- Infraorder: Araneomorphae
- Family: Gnaphosidae
- Genus: Haplodrassus; Chamberlin, 1922

Type species
- H. hiemalis (Emerton, 1909)

Species
- 79, see text

Synonyms
- Tuvadrassus Marusik & Logunov, 1995

= Haplodrassus =

Genus of spiders

Haplodrassus is a genus of ground spiders that was first described by R. V. Chamberlin in 1922. They range from 3 to 10 millimetres (0.12 to 0.39 in). H. signifer is the most widespread species, found across North America except for Alaska and northern Canada.

== Species ==
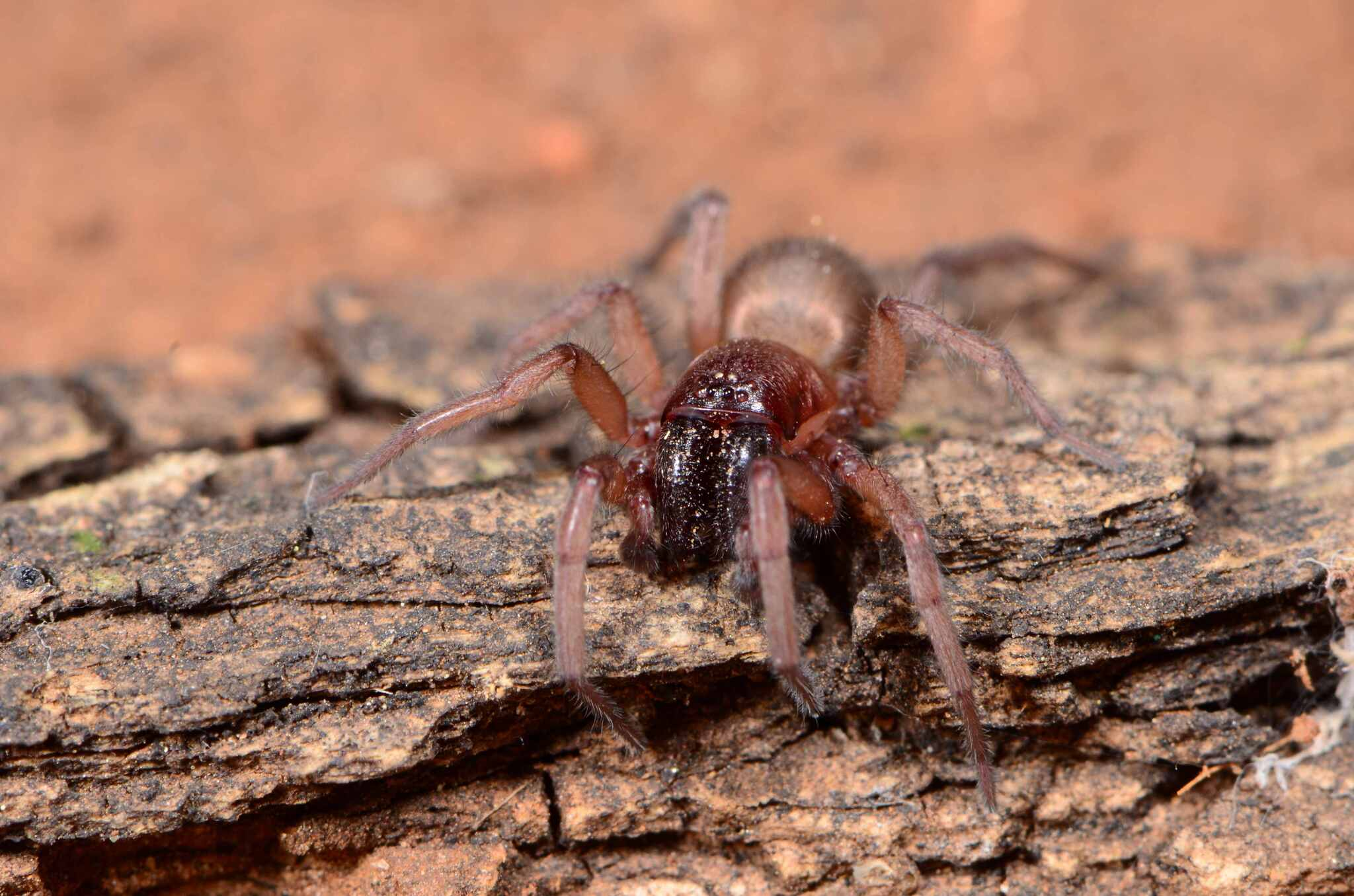
male H. lophognathus

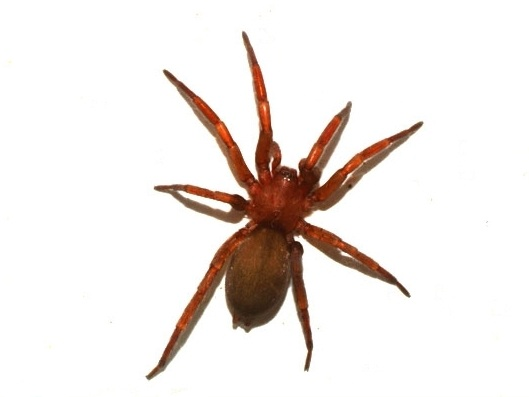
H. signifer

As of September 2025, this genus includes 101 species and one subspecies:

- Haplodrassus aenus Thaler, 1984 – Switzerland, Austria
- Haplodrassus alexeevi Ponomarev & Shmatko, 2017 – Russia (Europe)
- Haplodrassus ambalaensis Gajbe, 1992 – India
- Haplodrassus atarot Levy, 2004 – Israel
- Haplodrassus bechuanicus (Tucker, 1923) – Namibia, Botswana, South Africa
- Haplodrassus belgeri Ovtsharenko & Marusik, 1988 – Russia (South to north-east Siberia, Far East)
- Haplodrassus bengalensis Gajbe, 1992 – India
- Haplodrassus bicornis (Emerton, 1909) – Canada, United States
- Haplodrassus bohemicus Miller & Buchar, 1977 – Czech Republic, Slovakia, Austria, Hungary, Serbia, North Macedonia, Bulgaria, Greece, Ukraine, Russia (Europe, Caucasus)
- Haplodrassus caffrerianus (Purcell, 1907) – South Africa
- Haplodrassus calceatus (Purcell, 1907) – South Africa
- Haplodrassus canariensis Schmidt, 1977 – Canary Islands
- Haplodrassus caspius Ponomarev & Belosludtsev, 2008 – Greece, Russia (Europe, Caucasus), Azerbaijan, Iran, Kazakhstan
- Haplodrassus caucasius Ponomarev & Dvadnenko, 2013 – Caucasus (Russia, Georgia)
- Haplodrassus chamberlini Platnick & Shadab, 1975 – Canada, United States, Mexico
- Haplodrassus chotanagpurensis Gajbe, 1987 – India
- Haplodrassus cognatus (Westring, 1861) – Europe, Russia (Europe to Far East), Kazakhstan, Japan
- Haplodrassus concertor (Simon, 1878) – Spain, France, Italy
- Haplodrassus crassipes (Lucas, 1846) – Morocco, Algeria, Tunisia, Italy (Sicily)
- Haplodrassus creticus (Roewer, 1928) – Greece (Crete)
- Haplodrassus dalmatensis (L. Koch, 1866) – Europe, North Africa, Ethiopia, Turkey, Caucasus, Middle East, Russia, (Europe)
- Haplodrassus dentatus Xu & Song, 1987 – China
- Haplodrassus dentifer Bosmans & Abrous, 2018 – Morocco, Algeria, Tunisia, Spain
- Haplodrassus deserticola Schmidt & Krause, 1996 – Canary Islands
- Haplodrassus dixiensis Chamberlin & Woodbury, 1929 – United States
- Haplodrassus dregei (Purcell, 1907) – South Africa
- Haplodrassus dumdumensis Tikader, 1982 – India
- Haplodrassus eunis Chamberlin, 1922 – Alaska, Canada, United States
- Haplodrassus gilvus (Tullgren, 1910) – Tanzania
- Haplodrassus gooldi (Purcell, 1907) – South Africa
- Haplodrassus guiyangensis Yan & Yu, 2021 – China
- Haplodrassus hatsushibai Kamura, 2007 – Korea, Japan
- Haplodrassus helenae (Purcell, 1907) – South Africa
- Haplodrassus huarong Yin & Bao, 2012 – China
- Haplodrassus hunanensis Yin & Bao, 2012 – China
- Haplodrassus ibericus Melic, Silva & Barrientos, 2016 – Portugal, Spain
- Haplodrassus invalidus (O. Pickard-Cambridge, 1872) – Greece, Cyprus, Turkey, Israel, Egypt, Azerbaijan
- Haplodrassus ivlievi Ponomarev, 2015 – Russia (Europe)
- Haplodrassus jacobi Gajbe, 1992 – India
- Haplodrassus kanenoi Kamura, 1995 – Japan
- Haplodrassus kibonotensis (Tullgren, 1910) – Tanzania
- Haplodrassus kulczynskii Lohmander, 1942 – Europe, Turkey, Russia (Europe to Far East), Caucasus, Kazakhstan, China, Korea
- Haplodrassus lilliputanus Levy, 2004 – Israel
- Haplodrassus longivulva Bosmans & Hervé, 2018 – Morocco, Algeria
- Haplodrassus lophognathus (Purcell, 1907) – South Africa
- Haplodrassus lyndae Abrous & Bosmans, 2018 – Morocco, Algeria, Spain
- Haplodrassus lyratus (Purcell, 1907) – South Africa
- Haplodrassus lyriger (Simon, 1909) – Ethiopia
- Haplodrassus macellinus (Thorell, 1871) – France, Italy, Portugal?, Spain?
- Haplodrassus maculatus (Banks, 1904) – United States, Mexico
- Haplodrassus masculus (Tucker, 1923) – Zimbabwe, South Africa
- Haplodrassus mayumiae Kamura, 2007 – Korea, Japan
- Haplodrassus medes Zamani, Chatzaki, Esyunin & Marusik, 2021 – Iran
- Haplodrassus mediterraneus Levy, 2004 – Turkey, Syria, Lebanon, Israel, Jordan
- Haplodrassus mimus Chamberlin, 1922 – United States
- Haplodrassus minor (O. Pickard-Cambridge, 1879) – Europe, Turkey, Russia (Europe to West Siberia)
- Haplodrassus miryangensis Seo, 2017 – Korea
- Haplodrassus moderatus (Kulczyński, 1897) – Europe, Russia (Europe to Far East), China
- Haplodrassus montanus Paik & Sohn, 1984 – Russia (Far East), Korea
- Haplodrassus morosus (O. Pickard-Cambridge, 1872) – Greece, Turkey, Israel
- Haplodrassus nabozhenkoi Ponomarev, 2023 – Russia (Caucasus)
- Haplodrassus nagri Sajid, Zahid, Butt & Shah, 2024 – Pakistan
- Haplodrassus nigroscriptus (Simon, 1909) – Morocco
- Haplodrassus nojimai Kamura, 2007 – Korea, Japan
- Haplodrassus omissus (O. Pickard-Cambridge, 1872) – Canary Islands, Morocco, Mediterranean
- Haplodrassus orientalis (L. Koch, 1866) – Bulgaria, Greece, Turkey, Ukraine, Russia (Europe), Georgia, Kazakhstan
- Haplodrassus ovatus Bosmans & Hervé, 2018 – Algeria, Tunisia
- Haplodrassus ovtchinnikovi Ponomarev, 2008 – Turkey, Russia (Europe), Iran, Kazakhstan
- Haplodrassus paramecus Zhang, Song & Zhu, 2001 – China
- Haplodrassus pargongsanensis Paik, 1992 – Korea
- Haplodrassus ponomarevi Kovblyuk & Seyyar, 2009 – Greece, Turkey
- Haplodrassus pseudosignifer Marusik, Hippa & Koponen, 1996 – Ukraine, Russia (Europe to Central Asia), Iran
- Haplodrassus pugnans (Simon, 1880) – Egypt, Israel, Russia (Europe to Far East), Iran, China, Korea, Japan
- Haplodrassus qashqai Zamani, Chatzaki, Esyunin & Marusik, 2021 – Iraq, Iran
- Haplodrassus reginae Schmidt & Krause, 1998 – Cape Verde Islands
- Haplodrassus rhodanicus (Simon, 1914) – Portugal, Spain, France, Italy (Sardinia), Algeria, Tunisia, Iran
- Haplodrassus rufipes (Lucas, 1846) – Morocco, Algeria, Tunisia, Libya, Portugal, Spain, France, Italy
- Haplodrassus rufus (Savelyeva, 1972) – Kazakhstan
- Haplodrassus rugosus Tuneva, 2004 – Kazakhstan
- Haplodrassus sataraensis Tikader & Gajbe, 1977 – India
- Haplodrassus securifer Bosmans & Abrous, 2018 – Morocco, Algeria, Tunisia, Portugal, Spain, France, Italy, Belgium
- Haplodrassus sesquidentatus (Purcell, 1908) – South Africa
- Haplodrassus signifer (C. L. Koch, 1839) – North America, Europe, North Africa, Turkey, Caucasus, Russia (Europe to Far East), Israel, Iraq, Iran, Kazakhstan, Central Asia, China, Korea
- Haplodrassus silvestris (Blackwall, 1833) – Europe, Turkey, Caucasus
- Haplodrassus smythiesi (Simon, 1897) – India
- Haplodrassus soerenseni (Strand, 1900) – Europe, Russia (Europe to Far East), Kazakhstan, China, Turkey?
- Haplodrassus solitarius (Purcell, 1907) – Zimbabwe, South Africa
- Haplodrassus splendens (Tucker, 1923) – Namibia, Botswana, Zimbabwe, South Africa, Lesotho
- Haplodrassus stationis (Tucker, 1923) – South Africa
- Haplodrassus stuxbergi (L. Koch, 1879) – North America, Russia (Europe to Far East)
- Haplodrassus taepaikensis Paik, 1992 – Russia (South Siberia, Far East), Korea
- Haplodrassus taibo (Chamberlin, 1919) – United States
- Haplodrassus tegulatus (Schenkel, 1963) – Turkey, Russia (South Siberia), China
- Haplodrassus tehriensis Tikader & Gajbe, 1977 – India
- Haplodrassus tesselatus (Purcell, 1907) – South Africa
- Haplodrassus tortuosus (Tucker, 1923) – South Africa
- Haplodrassus triangularis Bosmans, 2018 – Morocco, Tunisia
- Haplodrassus typhon (Simon, 1878) – Algeria, Tunisia, Portugal, Spain, France, Italy (Sardinia)
- Haplodrassus umbratilis (L. Koch, 1866) – Europe, Kazakhstan
  - Haplodrassus umbratilis gothicus Lohmander, 1942 – Sweden
- Haplodrassus vastus (Hu, 1989) – China
- Haplodrassus yinae Liu, 2022 – China
