= Haplodrassus sesquidentatus =

Conservation status
- Least Concern (SANBI Red List)

Scientific classification
- Kingdom: Animalia
- Phylum: Arthropoda
- Subphylum: Chelicerata
- Class: Arachnida
- Order: Araneae
- Infraorder: Araneomorphae
- Family: Gnaphosidae
- Genus: Haplodrassus
- Species: H. sesquidentatus

Binomial name
- Haplodrassus sesquidentatus (Purcell, 1908)

Synonyms
- Drassodes sesquidentatus Purcell, 1908

Species of spider

Haplodrassus sesquidentatus is a species of spider in the family Gnaphosidae. It is endemic to South Africa.

== Distribution ==
Haplodrassus sesquidentatus is found in the Northern Cape province of South Africa.

== Habitat and ecology ==
The species is a free-living ground dweller that inhabits the Nama Karoo, Savanna, and Succulent Karoo biomes at altitudes ranging from 209 to 870 m above sea level. It has also been collected from pistachio orchards.

== Description ==
Haplodrassus sesquidentatus is known from both sexes.

== Conservation ==
Haplodrassus sesquidentatus is listed as Least Concern by the South African National Biodiversity Institute due to its wide distribution.

== Taxonomy ==
The species was originally described by W. F. Purcell in 1908 as Drassodes sesquidentatus from Kamaggas. In 2025, Yuri M. Marusik and Charles R. Haddad transferred the species to the genus Haplodrassus.
