= Haplodrassus caffrerianus =

Scientific classification
- Kingdom: Animalia
- Phylum: Arthropoda
- Subphylum: Chelicerata
- Class: Arachnida
- Order: Araneae
- Infraorder: Araneomorphae
- Family: Gnaphosidae
- Genus: Haplodrassus
- Species: H. caffrerianus

Binomial name
- Haplodrassus caffrerianus (Purcell, 1907)

Synonyms
- Drassodes caffrerianus Purcell, 1907

Species of spider

Haplodrassus caffrerianus is a species of spider in the family Gnaphosidae. It is endemic to South Africa.

== Distribution ==
Haplodrassus caffrerianus is found only in the Eastern Cape province of South Africa, specifically near Maclear at the type locality of Keneha Bridge.

== Habitat and ecology ==
The species is a free-living ground dweller that inhabits the Grassland biome at an altitude of 1,253 m above sea level.

== Description ==
Haplodrassus caffrerianus is known only from males.

== Conservation ==
Haplodrassus caffrerianus is listed as Data Deficient due to taxonomic reasons. More sampling is needed to collect female specimens and determine the species' full range.

== Taxonomy ==
The species was originally described by W. F. Purcell in 1907 as Drassodes caffrerianus. In 2025, Yuri M. Marusik and species:Charles R. Haddad transferred the species to the genus Haplodrassus.
