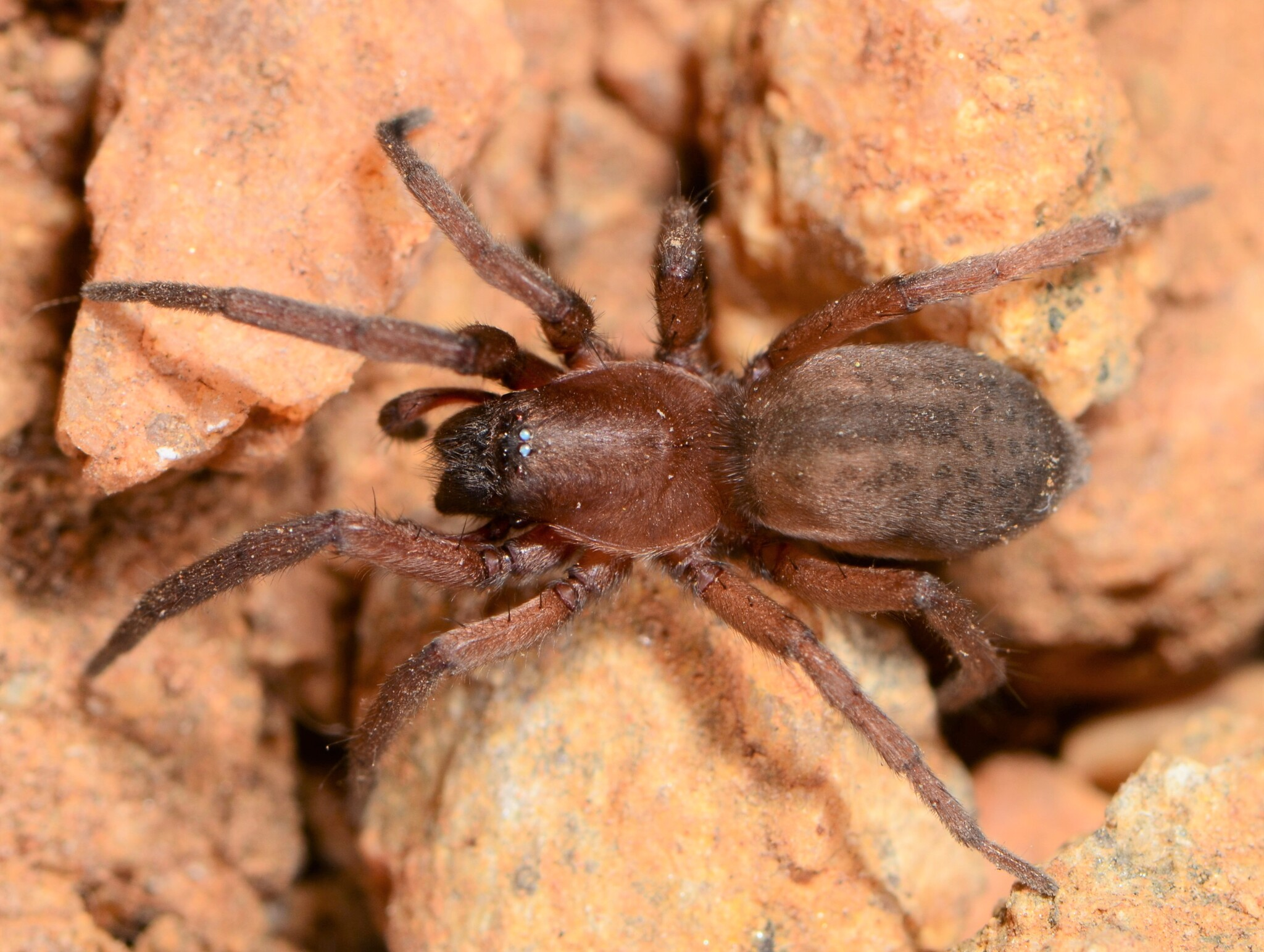
- female

Scientific classification
- Kingdom: Animalia
- Phylum: Arthropoda
- Subphylum: Chelicerata
- Class: Arachnida
- Order: Araneae
- Infraorder: Araneomorphae
- Family: Gnaphosidae
- Genus: Haplodrassus
- Species: H. splendens

Binomial name
- Haplodrassus splendens (Tucker, 1923)

Synonyms
- Drassodes splendens Tucker, 1923

= Haplodrassus splendens =

Species of spider

Haplodrassus splendens is a species of spider in the family Gnaphosidae. It occurs in southern Africa.

== Distribution ==
Haplodrassus splendens is found in Namibia, Botswana, Zimbabwe, Lesotho, and South Africa. Within South Africa, it is recorded from all nine provinces.

== Habitat and ecology ==
The species is a free-living ground dweller that inhabits the Fynbos, Grassland, Nama Karoo, Savanna, and Succulent Karoo biomes at altitudes ranging from 33 to 1,850 m above sea level.

== Description ==
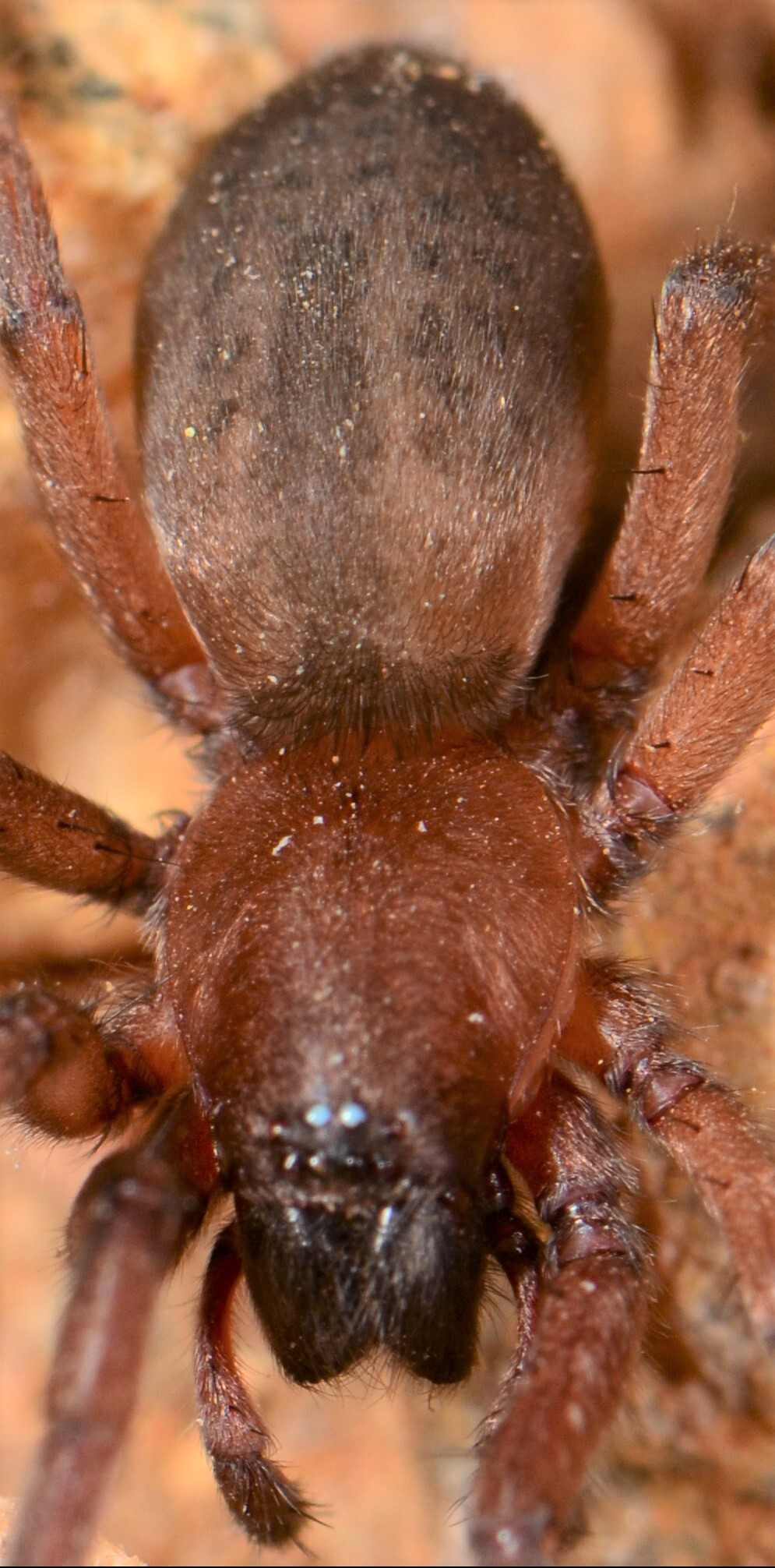
female

== Conservation ==
Haplodrassus splendens is listed as Least Concern by the South African National Biodiversity Institute due to its wide geographic range. The species is protected in more than ten protected areas.

== Taxonomy ==
The species was originally described by R.W.E. Tucker in 1923 as Drassodes splendens from Zimbabwe. In 2025, Yuri M. Marusik and Charles R. Haddad transferred the species to the genus Haplodrassus.
