= List of Ammoxenidae species =

This page lists all described species of the spider family Ammoxenidae accepted by the World Spider Catalog as of December 2020:

== Ammoxenus ==
Ammoxenus Simon, 1893

- A. amphalodes Dippenaar & Meyer, 1980 — South Africa
- A. coccineus Simon, 1893 (type) — Zambia, Namibia, Botswana, South Africa
- A. daedalus Dippenaar & Meyer, 1980 — South Africa
- A. kalaharicus Benoit, 1972 — Botswana, South Africa
- A. pentheri Simon, 1896 — Botswana, South Africa
- A. psammodromus Simon, 1910 — Namibia, Botswana, South Africa

== Austrammo ==
Austrammo Platnick, 2002

- A. harveyi Platnick, 2002 — Australia (Western Australia, South Australia)
- A. hirsti Platnick, 2002 — Australia (South Australia, Tasmania)
- A. monteithi Platnick, 2002 (type) — Eastern Australia
- A. rossi Platnick, 2002 — Australia (Western Australia, Northern Territory)

== Barrowammo ==
Barrowammo Platnick, 2002

- B. waldockae Platnick, 2002 (type) — Australia (Western Australia)

== Rastellus ==
Rastellus Platnick & Griffin, 1990

- R. africanus Platnick & Griffin, 1990 (type) — Namibia, Botswana
- R. deserticola Haddad, 2003 — Namibia, South Africa
- R. florisbad Platnick & Griffin, 1990 — South Africa
- R. kariba Platnick & Griffin, 1990 — Botswana, Zimbabwe, South Africa
- R. narubis Platnick & Griffin, 1990 — Namibia
- R. sabulosus Platnick & Griffin, 1990 — Namibia
- R. struthio Platnick & Griffin, 1990 — Namibia, Botswana
