= Ammoxenus pentheri =

Penther's termite feeding spider

Conservation status
- Least Concern (SANBI Red List)

Scientific classification
- Kingdom: Animalia
- Phylum: Arthropoda
- Subphylum: Chelicerata
- Class: Arachnida
- Order: Araneae
- Infraorder: Araneomorphae
- Family: Gnaphosidae
- Genus: Ammoxenus
- Species: A. pentheri

Binomial name
- Ammoxenus pentheri Simon, 1897

Species of spider

Ammoxenus pentheri is a species of spider in the family Gnaphosidae. It is found in southern Africa and is known as Penther's termite feeding spider.

== Etymology ==
The species is named after Arnold Penther, an Austrian naturalist and collector who gathered specimens in southern Africa.

== Distribution ==
A. pentheri is found in Botswana and South Africa. In South Africa, it is recorded from four provinces: Eastern Cape, KwaZulu-Natal, Northern Cape, and Western Cape. The species occurs at elevations from 63 to 1,799 meters above sea level.

== Habitat and ecology ==
This free-running ground spider lives in sand mounds left by termites and is very fast-moving. When disturbed, individuals dive head-first into sand. They are specialist predators of harvester termites and are found in areas where these termites are active. The species has been recorded from Fynbos, Grassland, Savanna, Succulent Karoo, and Thicket biomes.

== Description ==
A. pentheri exhibits the characteristic morphology of Ammoxenus species. Both males and females are known for this species.

== Conservation status ==
The species is listed as Least Concern due to its wide geographical range and absence of known threats. It is protected in six protected areas, including three national parks: Mountain Zebra National Park, Addo Elephant National Park, and Karoo National Park, as well as the Swartberg Nature Reserve.
