= Barrowammo =

Scientific classification
- Kingdom: Animalia
- Phylum: Arthropoda
- Subphylum: Chelicerata
- Class: Arachnida
- Order: Araneae
- Infraorder: Araneomorphae
- Family: Gnaphosidae
- Genus: Barrowammo
- Species: B. waldockae

Binomial name
- Barrowammo waldockae Platnick, 2002

Genus of spiders

Barrowammo is a genus of North and West Australian termite hunters containing the single species, Barrowammo waldockae. It was first described by Norman I. Platnick in 2002, and has only been found in Australia. The name is a portmanteau of Barrow Island and Ammoxenidae.

Members of this genus are most similar to Austrammo, but there are several distinct differences. Notably, they lack setae on the back of the last segment of the pedipalp, which is a defining characteristic of Austrammo. In males, there are tubercles on the bulb of the pedipalp and a scutum on the back of the abdomen that doesn't occur in members of Austrammo. In females, the abdomen is rectangular, while those of Austrammo are triangular. These differences were considered enough to create a new genus.
