= Arnold Penther =

Austrian naturalist

Arnold Penther (15 October 1865, Rome – 6 April 1931, Vienna) was an Austrian naturalist.

From 1887 to 1891 he studied natural sciences in Vienna, receiving his PhD in 1892. Beginning in 1898 he worked as a volunteer at the Naturhistorisches Museum in Vienna, later attaining the role of curator. At the museum, he specialized in the field of arachnology.

In 1894–96 he conducted zoological and botanical investigations in South Africa and Rhodesia. Ornithological specimens collected on the expedition were donated to the natural history museum in Vienna, and many of the plants he collected on the trip became part of the Vienna herbarium. Later on in his career, he embarked on scientific expeditions to Asia Minor, Mesopotamia and the Balkans.

The genus Pentheriella (family Asteraceae, synonym Heteromma) was named in his honor by Karl August Otto Hoffmann and Reinhold Conrad Muschler, and taxa with the specific epithet of pentheri are named after him, an example being Rhus pentheri.

== Selected writings ==
- Catalog Der Bisher Bekannt Gewordenen Südafrikanischen Land- und Süsswasser-Mollusken, (with Rudolf Sturany), 1899 – Catalog of known South African land and freshwater mollusks.
- Ergebnisse einer naturwissenschaftlichen Reise zum Erdschias-Dagh. (Kleinasien), (with Emerich Zederbauer), 1905 – Results of a scientific journey to Erdschias-Dagh (Asia Minor).
- Bericht über die 1914 ausgeführte zoologische Forschungsreise im nordalbanisch-montenegrinischen Grenzgebiet, 1914 – Report on the 1914 zoological research trip in the North Albanian-Montenegro border region.
- Bericht über die 1916 im Auftrage und auf Kosten der Kaiserl. Akademie der Wissenschaften in Wien ausgeführte zoologische Forschungsreise in Serbien und Neumontenegro, 1916 – Report on the 1916 zoological expedition to Serbia and Neumontenegro.
