= Ammoxenus daedalus =

Dendron termite feeding spider

Scientific classification
- Kingdom: Animalia
- Phylum: Arthropoda
- Subphylum: Chelicerata
- Class: Arachnida
- Order: Araneae
- Infraorder: Araneomorphae
- Family: Gnaphosidae
- Genus: Ammoxenus
- Species: A. daedalus

Binomial name
- Ammoxenus daedalus Dippenaar & Meyer, 1980

Species of spider

Ammoxenus daedalus is a species of spider in the family Gnaphosidae. It is endemic to Limpopo province, South Africa, where it is known as the Dendron termite feeding spider.

== Etymology ==
The species name daedalus likely refers to Daedalus from Greek mythology.

== Distribution ==
A. daedalus is presently known only from two localities in Limpopo province, South Africa: near Dendron and at Louis Trichardt. The species has a very restricted range and is found at elevations between 969 and 1,025 meters above sea level.

== Habitat and ecology ==
This free-running ground spider lives in sand mounds left by termites and is a specialist predator of harvester termites, particularly Hodotermes species. When disturbed, individuals dive head-first into sand. The species was sampled in high numbers (over 400 specimens) from pitfall traps on a farm near Dendron in the Savanna biome.

== Description ==
A. daedalus exhibits the characteristic Ammoxenus morphology.

== Conservation status ==
The species is currently listed as Data Deficient due to its extremely limited known range and uncertainty about its taxonomic status. Bird (2003) suggested that A. daedalus may be a junior synonym of Ammoxenus psammodromus, but this revision remains unpublished. The species is not currently recorded from any protected areas, and more sampling is needed to determine its conservation status.
