= Heteromma =

Scientific classification
- Kingdom: Plantae
- Clade: Embryophytes
- Clade: Tracheophytes
- Clade: Angiosperms
- Clade: Eudicots
- Clade: Asterids
- Order: Asterales
- Family: Asteraceae
- Subfamily: Asteroideae
- Tribe: Astereae
- Subtribe: Homochrominae
- Genus: Heteromma; Benth.

Type species
- Heteromma decurrens (DC.) O.Hoffm.

Synonyms
- Pentheriella O. Hoffm. & Muschl.

Genus of flowering plants

Heteromma is a genus of South African flowering plants in the family Asteraceae.

Species

- Heteromma decurrens (DC.) O.Hoffm.
- Heteromma krookii (O.Hoffm. & Muschl.) Hilliard & B.L.Burtt
- Heteromma simplicifolium J.M.Wood & M.S.Evans
