= Rastellus =

Scientific classification
- Kingdom: Animalia
- Phylum: Arthropoda
- Subphylum: Chelicerata
- Class: Arachnida
- Order: Araneae
- Infraorder: Araneomorphae
- Family: Gnaphosidae
- Genus: Rastellus; Platnick & Griffin, 1990

Type species
- Rastellus africanus Platnick & Griffin, 1990

Genus of spiders

Rastellus is a genus of small spiders in the family Gnaphosidae. The genus contains seven species endemic to southern Africa, with the northernmost record from Botswana. Originally placed in the family Ammoxenidae, the genus was transferred to Gnaphosidae in 2022.

== Etymology ==
The genus name Rastellus is derived from Latin rastellum, meaning "small rake", referring to the rastelliform (rake-like) digging scoop on the chelicerae.

== Taxonomy ==
The genus was described by Norman I. Platnick and E. Griffin in 1990, with Rastellus africanus as the type species. An additional species was described by Haddad (2003).

== Distribution and habitat ==
Rastellus species are found throughout southern Africa, occurring in Botswana, Namibia, South Africa, and Zimbabwe. They inhabit sandy environments and are adapted to life in sandy habitats, often found near termite colonies.

== Description ==
Rastellus species are very small spiders, measuring only 2–3 mm in body length. They are characterized by their pale yellow coloration without distinct markings, except for the darker tips of the chelicerae and eye region. The carapace is convex in the cephalic region and oval in dorsal view, widest between legs II and III. The eyes are arranged in a circular pattern with large posterior median eyes.

The most distinctive feature is the modified chelicerae, which bear a distal, rastelliform (rake-like) digging scoop used for excavating sand. The opisthosoma and legs are similar in color to the carapace, and the legs are of medium length.

== Ecology and behavior ==
Rastellus species are ground-living spiders adapted to sandy habitats. They use their rastelliform digging scoops to excavate burrows 4–6 cm deep, which they line with silk. The digging process involves initially diving into sand to a shallow depth, gathering sand with the scoops, then turning around and laying silk strands before pushing sand to the surface.

Most specimens are collected in pitfall traps, indicating they wander actively, though extensive hand searching has been unsuccessful in locating additional specimens. The spiders likely spend most of their time buried beneath the sand surface. Their excavations have been found near Psammotermes termite nests.

== Species ==
As of September 2025, the genus contains seven recognized species:

- Rastellus africanus Platnick & Griffin, 1990 – Namibia, Botswana (type species)
- Rastellus deserticola Haddad, 2003 – Namibia, South Africa
- Rastellus florisbad Platnick & Griffin, 1990 – South Africa
- Rastellus kariba Platnick & Griffin, 1990 – Botswana, Zimbabwe, South Africa
- Rastellus narubis Platnick & Griffin, 1990 – Namibia
- Rastellus sabulosus Platnick & Griffin, 1990 – Namibia
- Rastellus struthio Platnick & Griffin, 1990 – Namibia, Botswana
