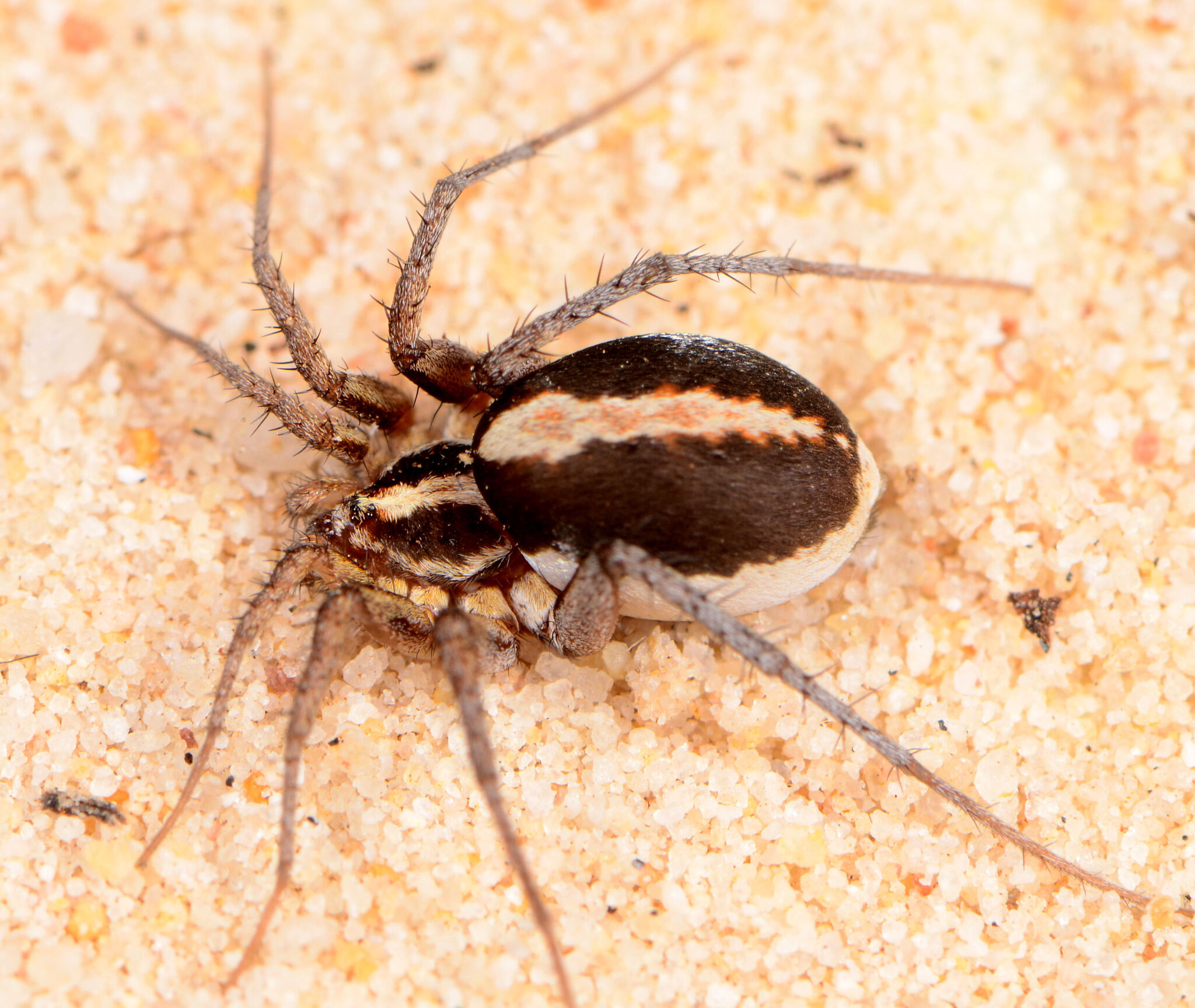
- Female
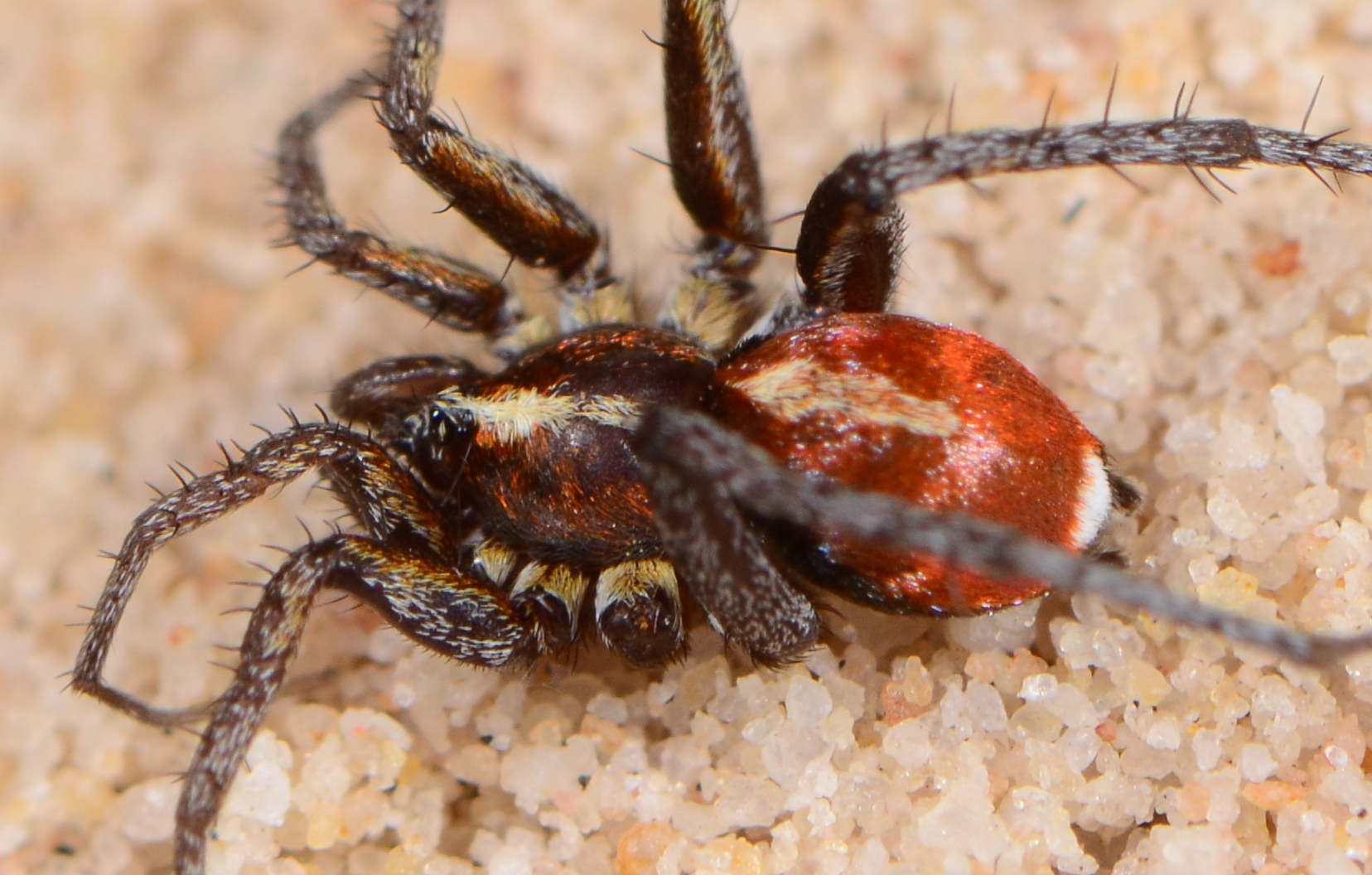
- Male

Scientific classification
- Kingdom: Animalia
- Phylum: Arthropoda
- Subphylum: Chelicerata
- Class: Arachnida
- Order: Araneae
- Infraorder: Araneomorphae
- Family: Gnaphosidae
- Genus: Ammoxenus
- Species: A. amphalodes

Binomial name
- Ammoxenus amphalodes Dippenaar & Meyer, 1980

= Ammoxenus amphalodes =

Common termite feeding spider

Species of spider

Ammoxenus amphalodes is a species of spider in the family Gnaphosidae. It is endemic to South Africa, where it is commonly known as the common termite feeding spider.

== Distribution ==
A. amphalodes is widespread in South Africa, occurring in six of the nine provinces: Free State, Gauteng, Limpopo, North West, KwaZulu-Natal, and Mpumalanga. The species is found at elevations ranging from 54 to 2,302 meters above sea level.

== Habitat and ecology ==
This species is a free-running ground dweller that lives in sand mounds left by Hodotermes mossambicus termites. The spiders are very agile and when disturbed will dive head-first into sand. They are specialist predators of harvester termites, particularly H. mossambicus and Psammotermes species, with their activity density closely coupled to termite activity.

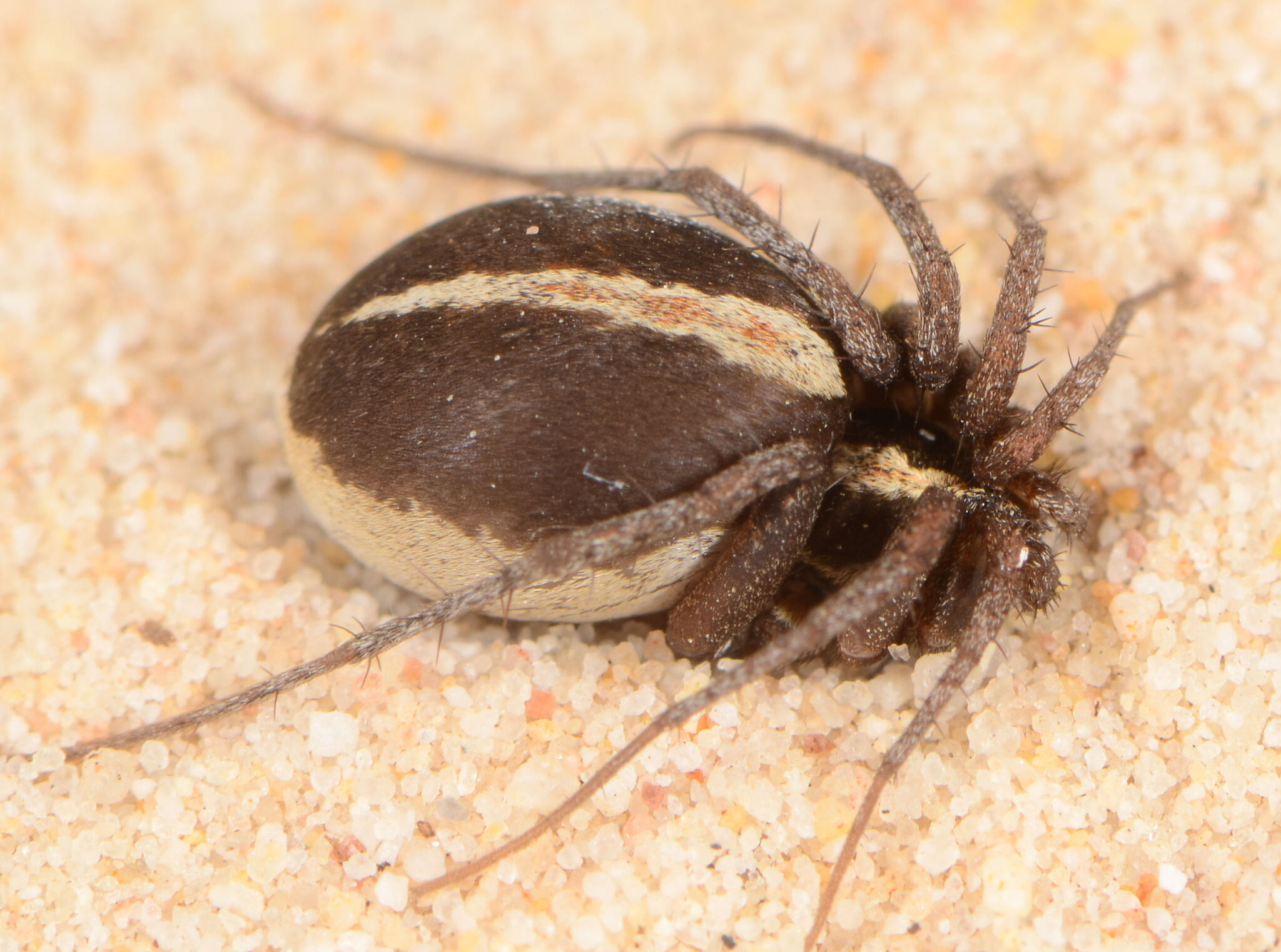
female

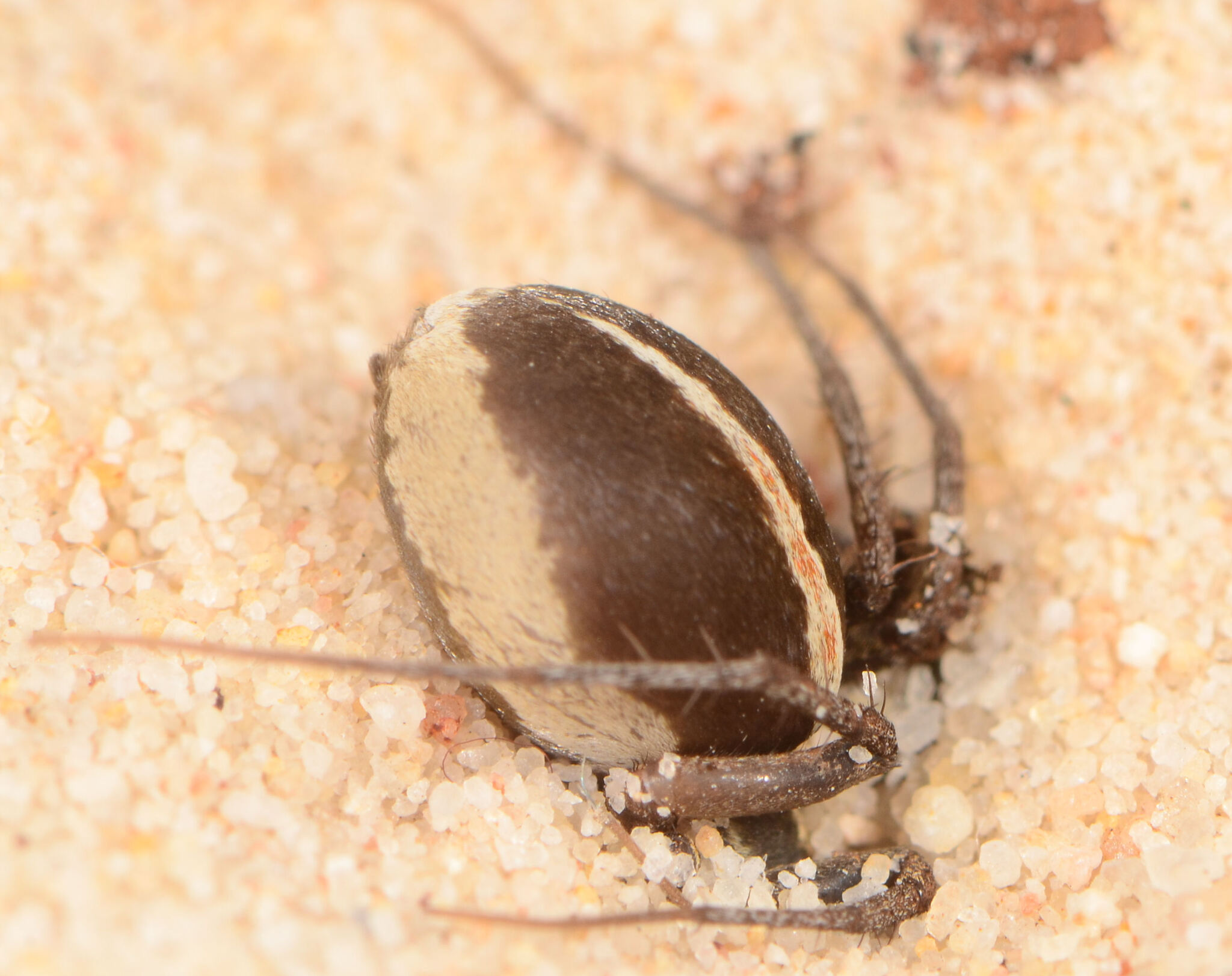

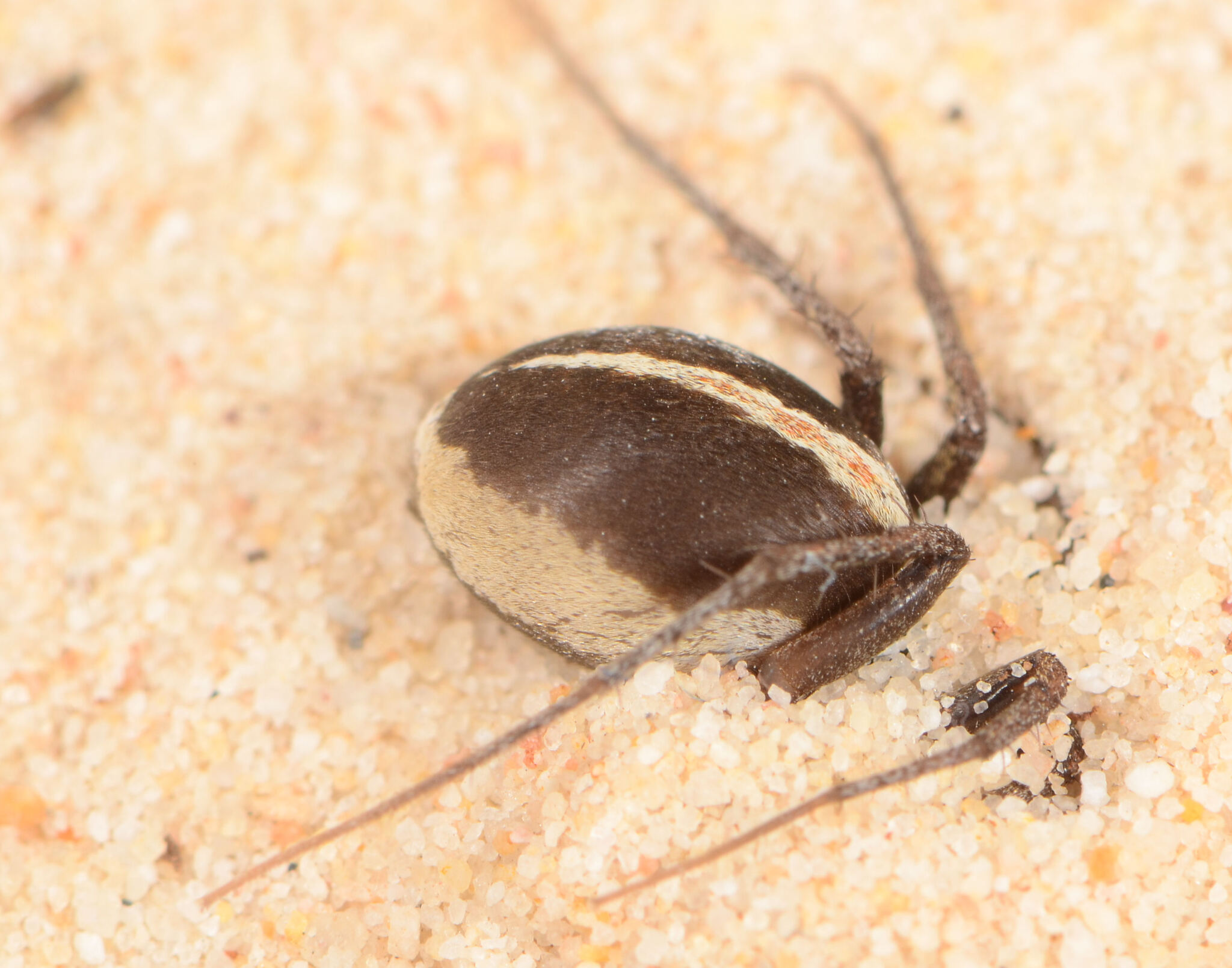

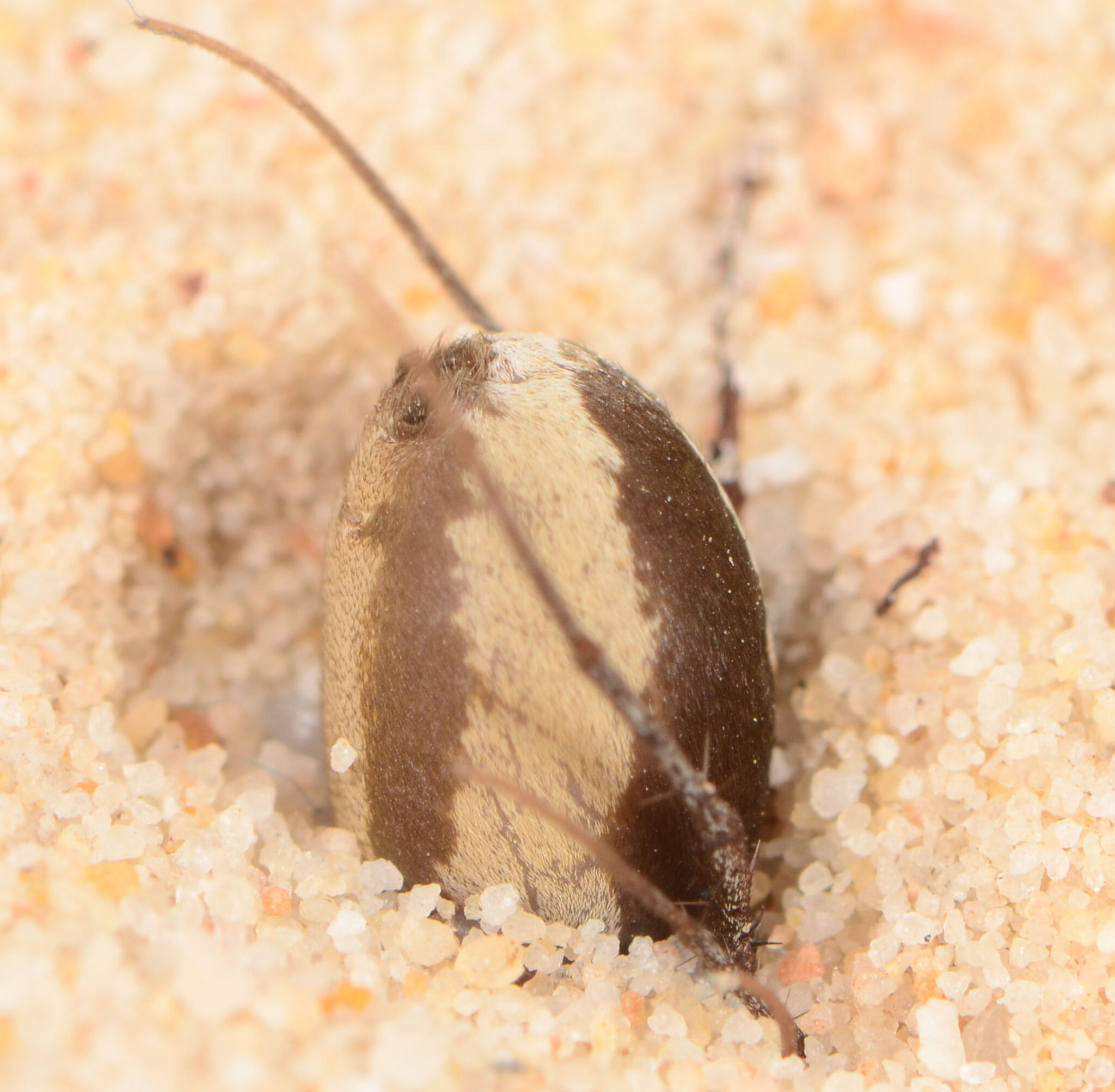

A. amphalodes is a univoltine species with a wide reproductive period corresponding to the seasonal occurrence of termites. The species occurs in Grassland, Savanna, Nama Karoo, and Succulent Karoo biomes. They can be easily sampled with pitfall traps and occasionally occur in agricultural areas, having been recorded from cotton fields.

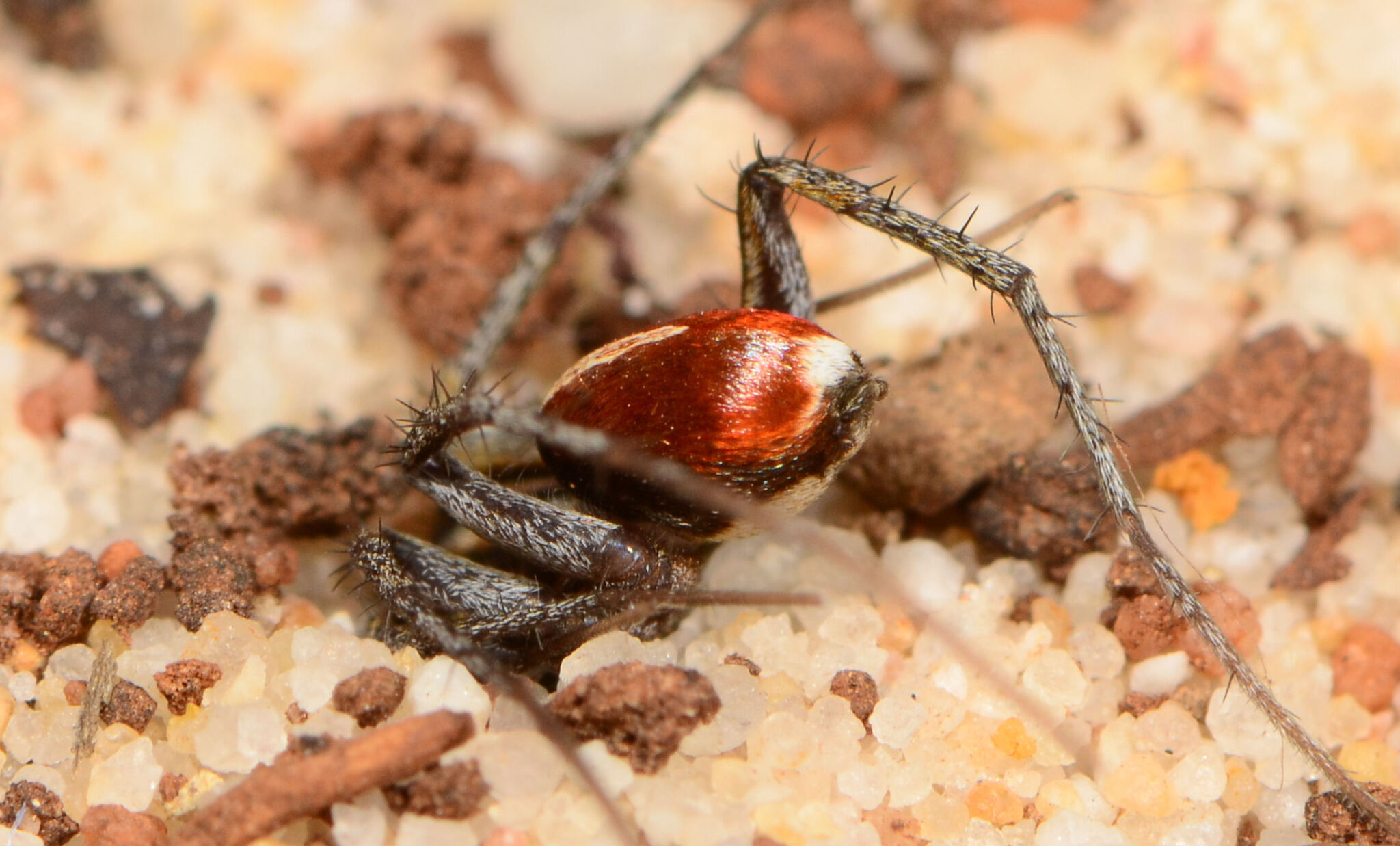
male

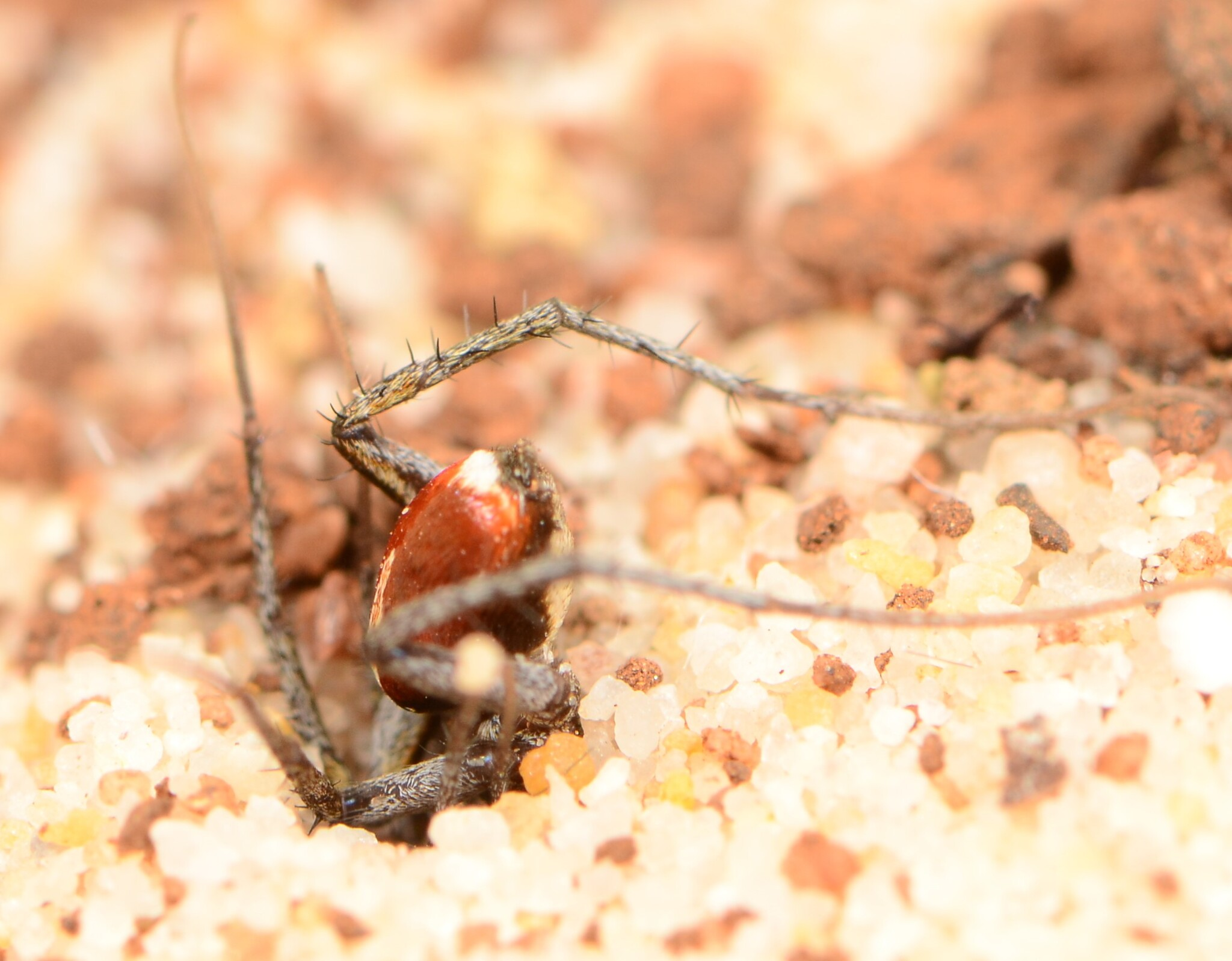

== Description ==
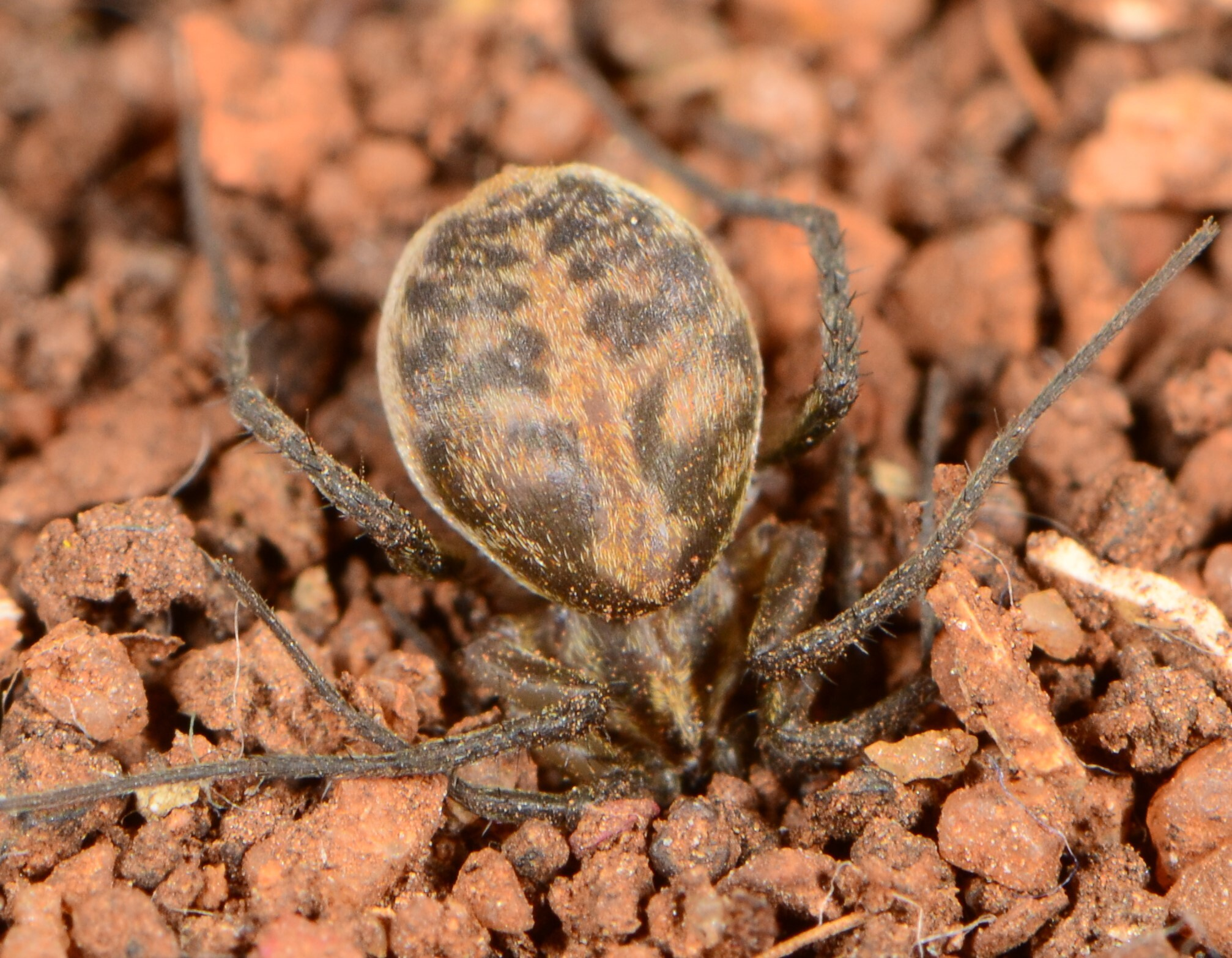
female

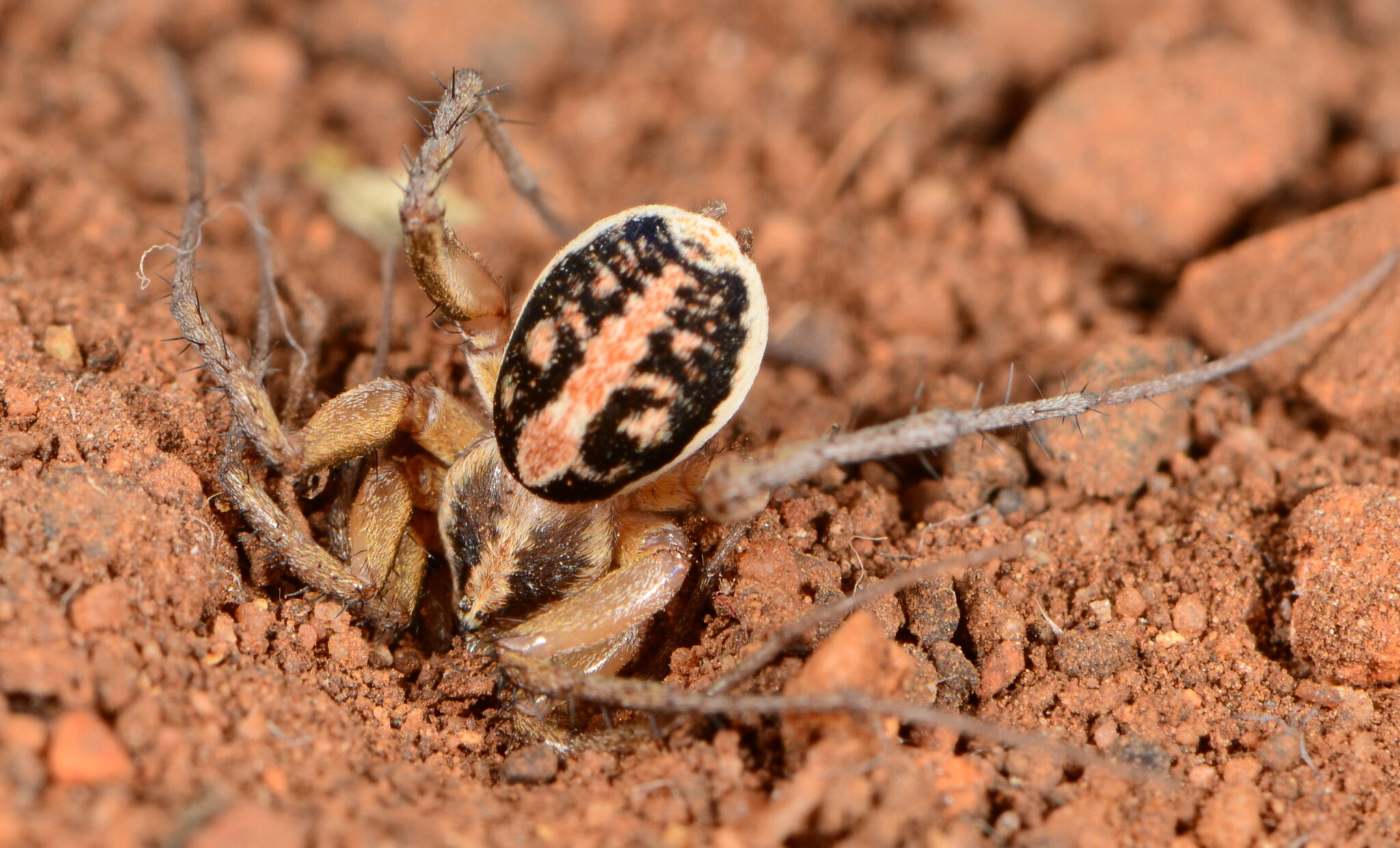
female

Like other Ammoxenus species, A. amphalodes has modified chelicerae with horn-like setae that curve downward and are covered with obtuse spines used for sand-diving.

== Conservation status ==
The species is listed as Least Concern due to its wide geographical range and absence of known threats. It is protected in several nature reserves including Nylsvlei Nature Reserve, Polokwane Nature Reserve, and Roodeplaatdam Nature Reserve.
