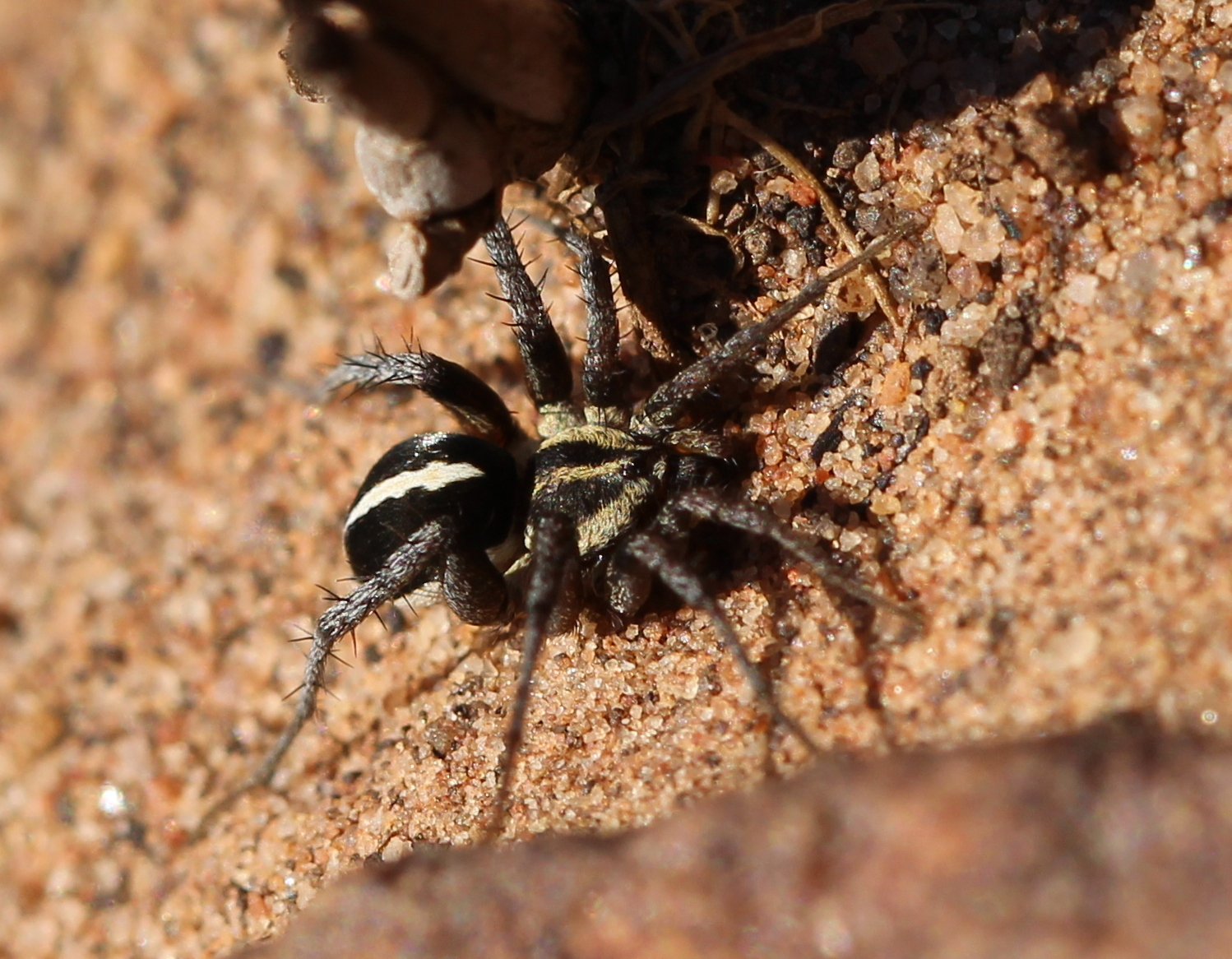

Scientific classification
- Kingdom: Animalia
- Phylum: Arthropoda
- Subphylum: Chelicerata
- Class: Arachnida
- Order: Araneae
- Infraorder: Araneomorphae
- Family: Gnaphosidae
- Genus: Ammoxenus
- Species: A. kalaharicus

Binomial name
- Ammoxenus kalaharicus Benoit, 1972

= Ammoxenus kalaharicus =

Kalahari termite feeding spider

Species of spider

Ammoxenus kalaharicus is a species of spider in the family Gnaphosidae. It is found in southern Africa and is known as the Kalahari termite feeding spider.

== Etymology ==
The species name kalaharicus refers to the Kalahari Desert region where the species was first discovered.

== Distribution ==
A. kalaharicus is found in Botswana and South Africa. The species was originally described from Botswana by Pierre Benoit in 1972. In South Africa, it is recorded from two provinces at elevations ranging from 77 to 1,850 meters above sea level.

== Habitat and ecology ==
The species is particularly abundant in the Cederberg Wilderness Area where specimens have been collected from various altitudes using pitfall traps. A. kalaharicus occurs in Fynbos and Succulent Karoo biomes. Like other Ammoxenus species, it is a specialist predator associated with termite colonies.

== Description ==
A. kalaharicus is currently known only from female specimens. As with other members of the genus, it is likely small to medium-sized, with modified chelicerae bearing horn-like setae that curve downward from an extension of the clypeus and are covered with numerous obtuse spines used for digging.

== Conservation status ==
The species is listed as Least Concern due to its wide geographical range and absence of identified threats. It receives protection in the Cederberg Wilderness Area where it has been sampled from several locations.
