= Rastellus deserticola =

Desert lesser termite-feeding spider

Conservation status
- Least Concern (SANBI Red List)

Scientific classification
- Kingdom: Animalia
- Phylum: Arthropoda
- Subphylum: Chelicerata
- Class: Arachnida
- Order: Araneae
- Infraorder: Araneomorphae
- Family: Gnaphosidae
- Genus: Rastellus
- Species: R. deserticola

Binomial name
- Rastellus deserticola Haddad, 2003

Species of spider

Rastellus deserticola is a species of spider in the family Gnaphosidae. It is found in southern Africa and is known as the desert lesser termite-feeding spider.

== Etymology ==
The species name deserticola is derived from Latin, meaning "desert-dweller", referring to the spider's adaptation to arid sandy environments.

== Distribution ==
R. deserticola is found in Namibia and South Africa. The species was described by Charles R. Haddad in 2003 from the Green Valley Nuts farm near Prieska in the Northern Cape, South Africa. In South Africa, it is known from two provinces at elevations from 243 to 1,850 meters above sea level.

== Habitat and ecology ==
This free-living ground dweller is adapted to life in sandy habitats. The spiders excavate burrows 4–6 cm deep, lining them with silk. Their excavations have been found near termite nests, and they have been collected with termites in dead wood on the ground. Adults are active primarily in spring and early summer, and specimens are sometimes captured in pitfall traps, indicating they wander actively across the sand surface.

The species occurs in Nama Karoo grassland and is particularly abundant in the Cederberg Wilderness Area.

== Conservation status ==
The species is listed as Least Concern due to its relatively wide geographical range. It receives protection in the Benfontein Nature Reserve and is abundant in the Cederberg Wilderness Area.
