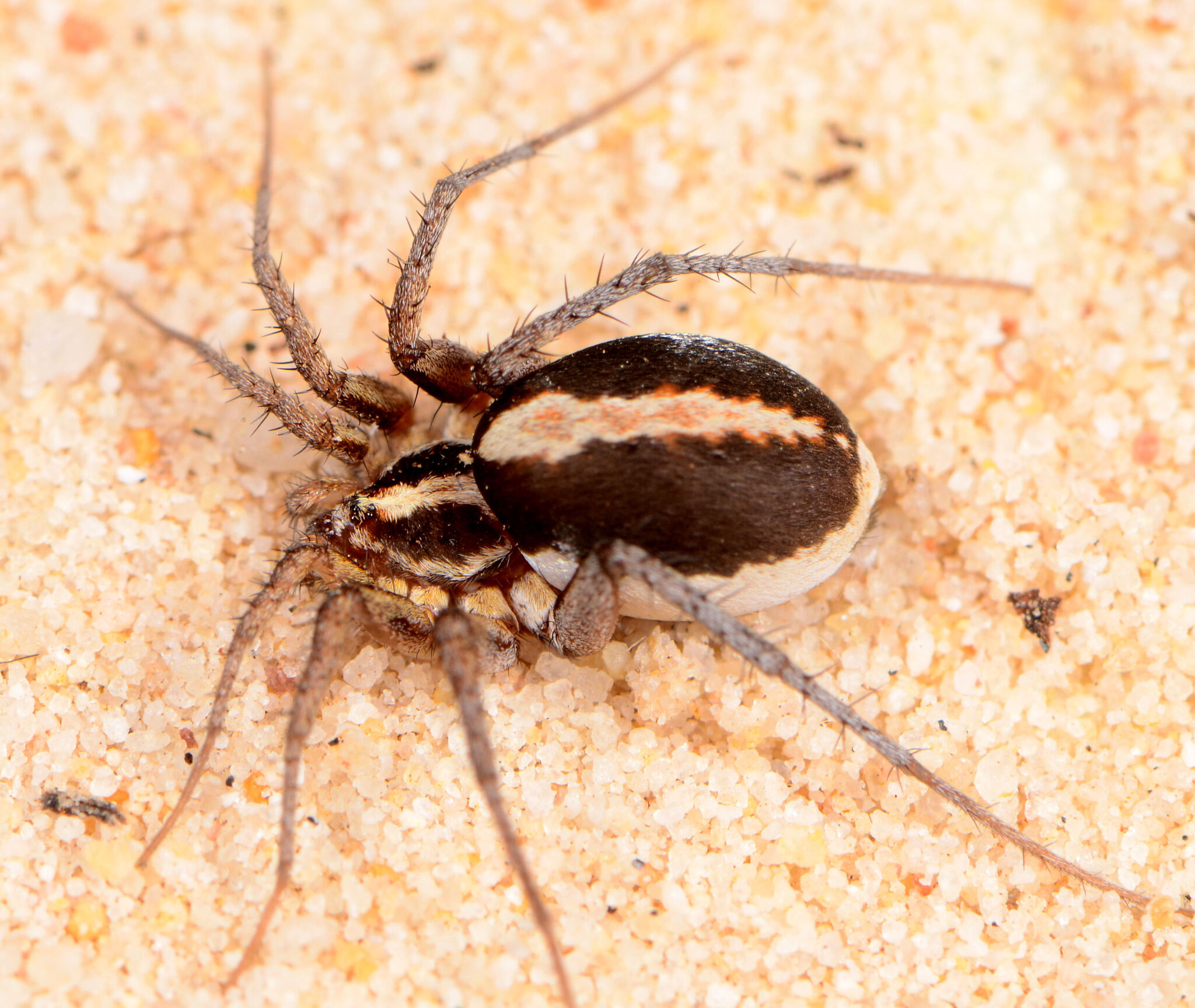
- Female A. amphalodes
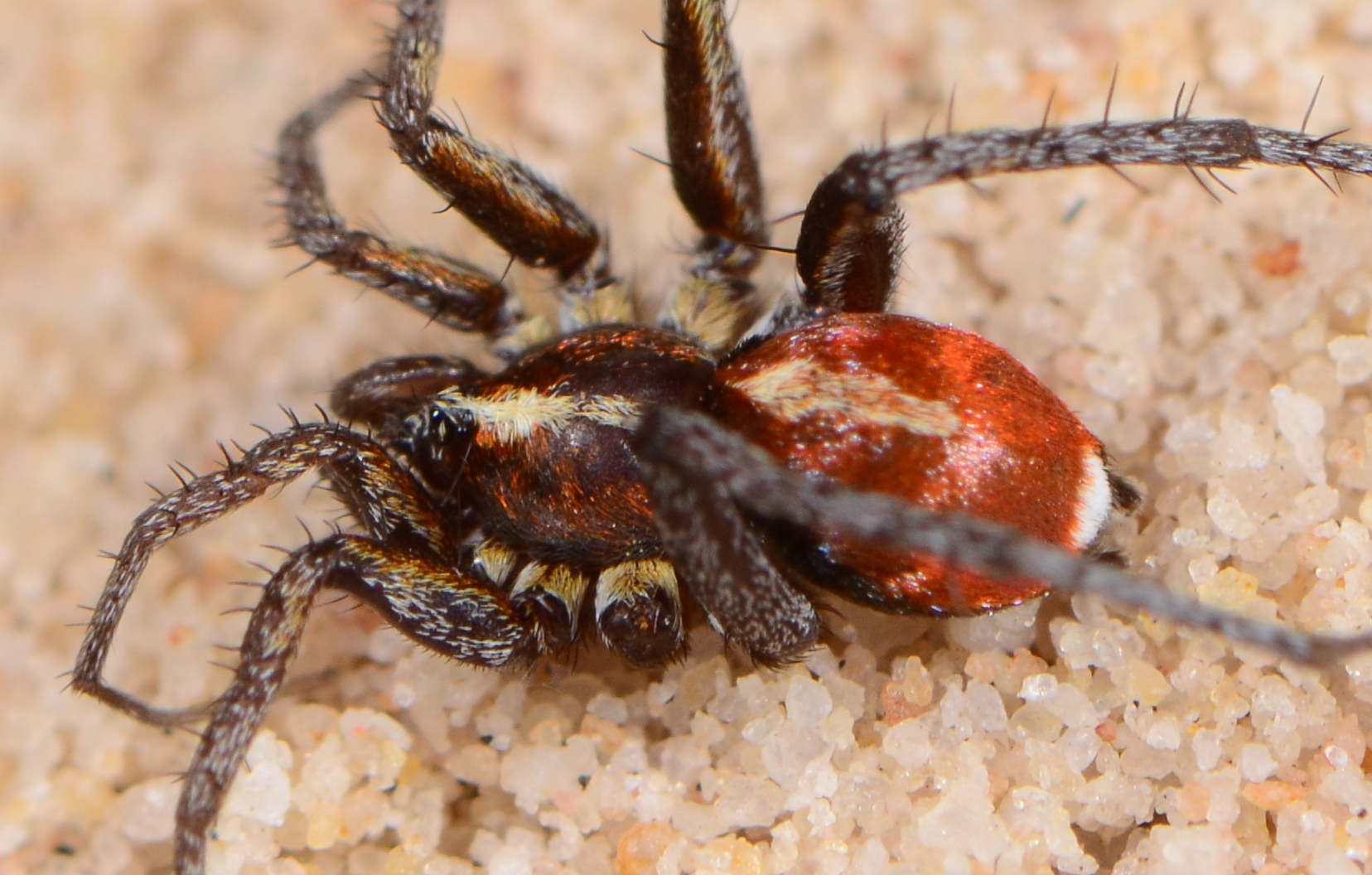
- Male A. amphalodes

Scientific classification
- Kingdom: Animalia
- Phylum: Arthropoda
- Subphylum: Chelicerata
- Class: Arachnida
- Order: Araneae
- Infraorder: Araneomorphae
- Family: Gnaphosidae
- Genus: Ammoxenus; Simon, 1893

Type species
- Ammoxenus coccineus Simon, 1893

= Ammoxenus =

Genus of spiders

Ammoxenus is a genus of spiders in the family Gnaphosidae. The genus contains six species endemic to southern Africa, with the northernmost record from Zambia. Originally placed in the family Ammoxenidae, the genus was transferred to Gnaphosidae in 2022.

== Taxonomy ==
The genus was first described by Eugène Simon in 1893, with Ammoxenus coccineus as the type species. Pierre Benoit revised the genus in 1972, and Dippenaar & Meyer added two new species in 1980. Bird (2003) undertook a comprehensive revision as part of an MSc thesis, recognizing eleven new species, but these results remain unpublished.

== Distribution and habitat ==
Ammoxenus species are found throughout southern Africa, occurring in Botswana, Namibia, South Africa, and Zambia. They inhabit sandy areas where harvester termites are active, particularly in association with termite genera Hodotermes, Microhodotermes, and Psammotermes.

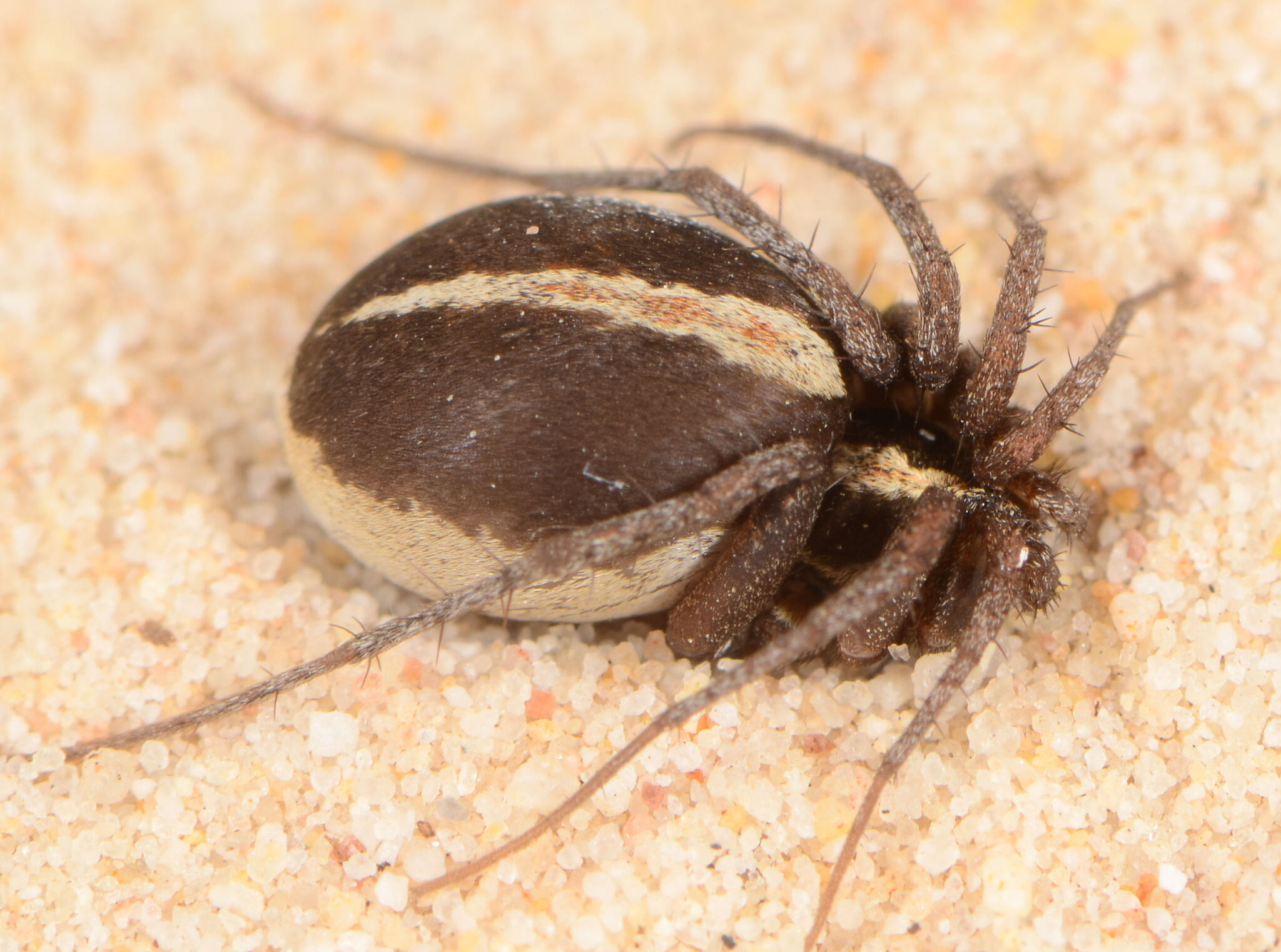
female A. amphalodes

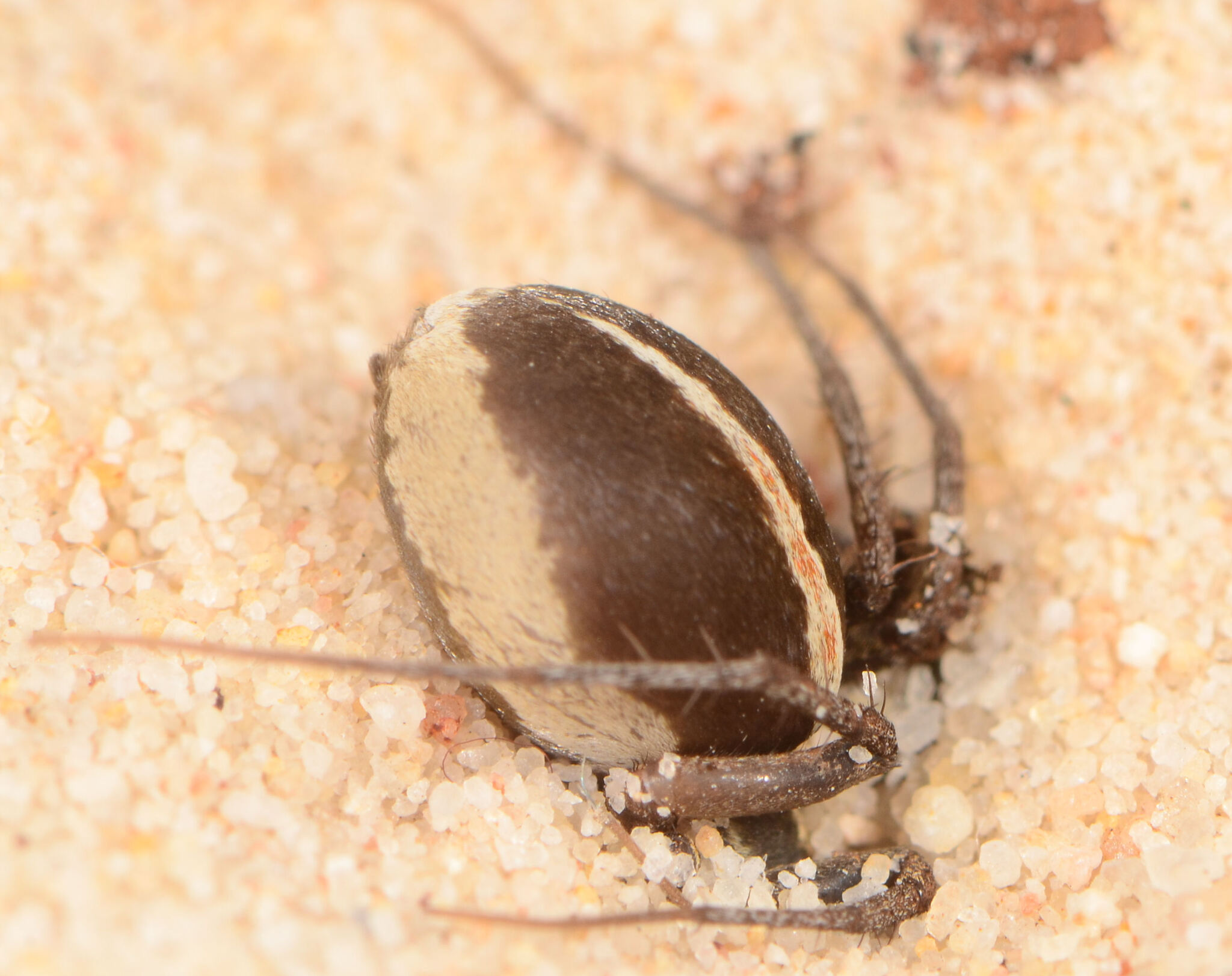

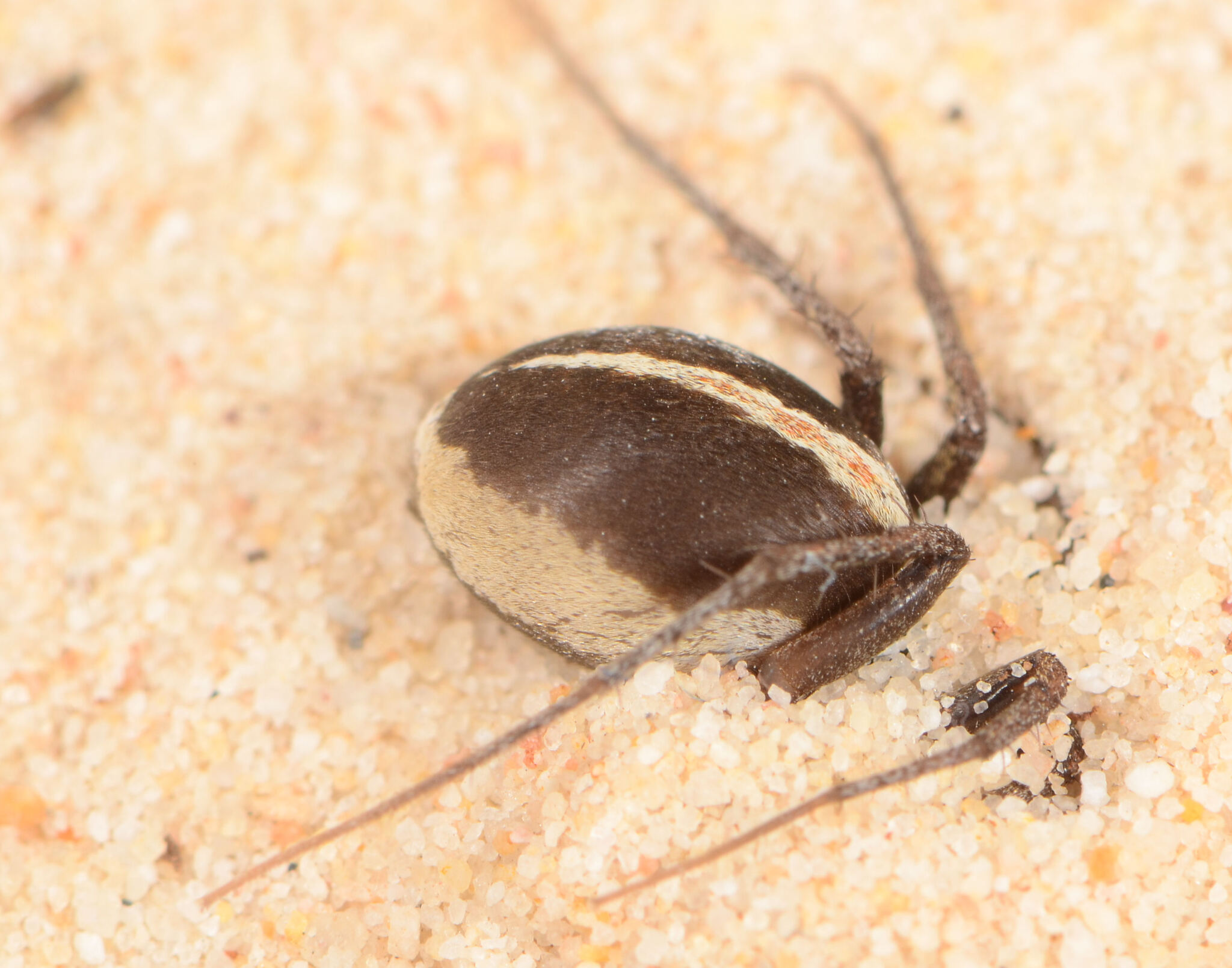

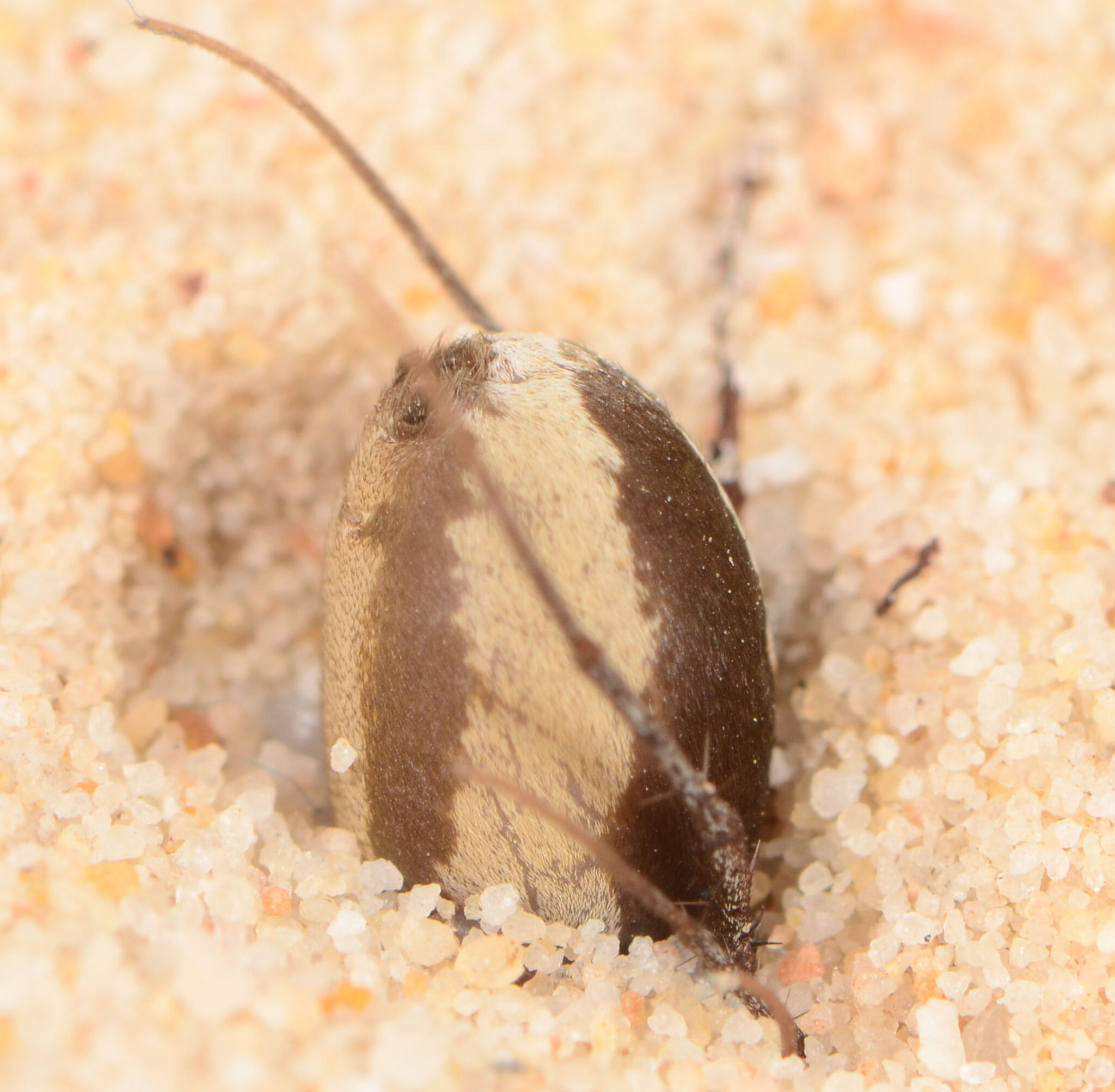

== Description ==
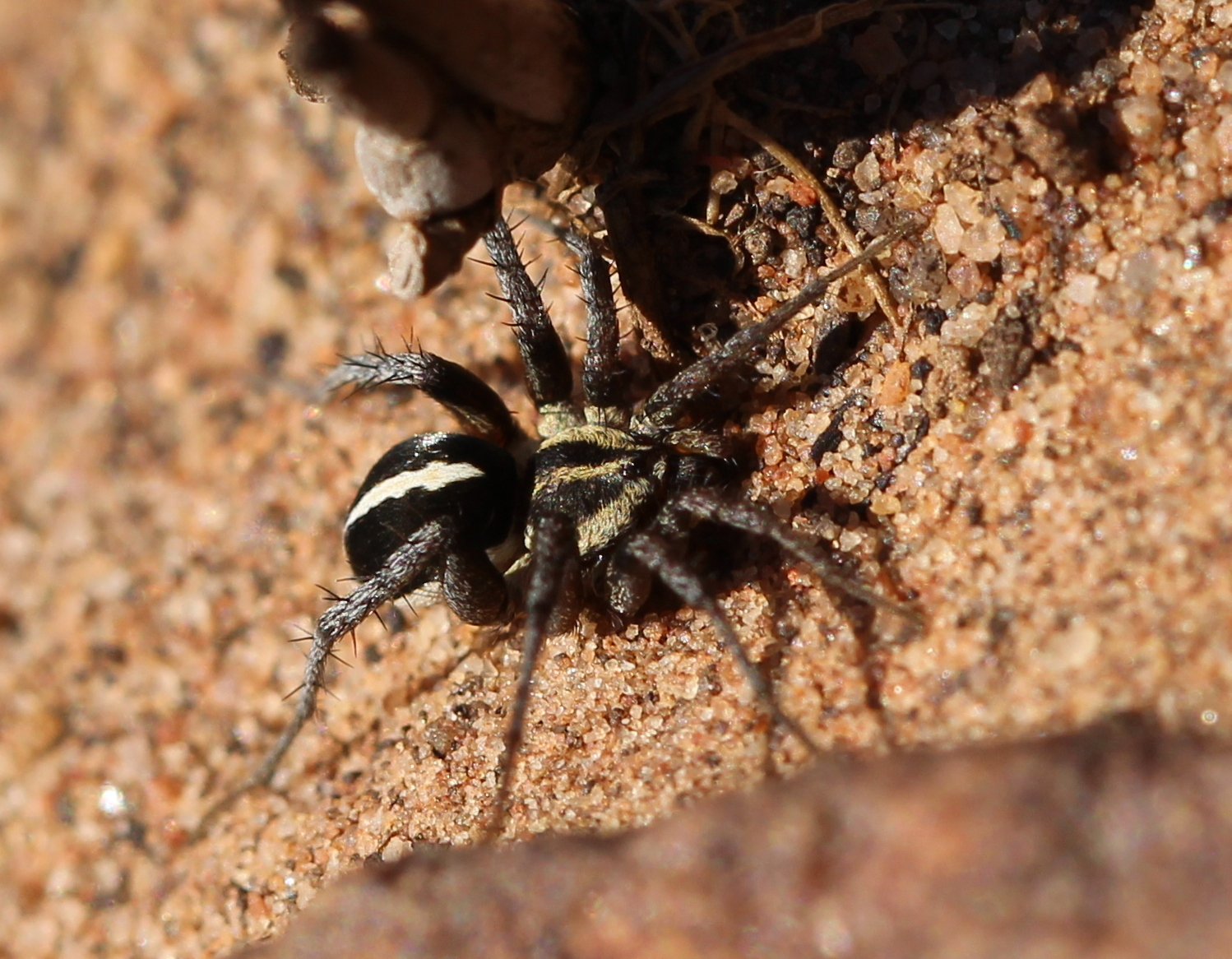
A. kalaharicus

Members of Ammoxenus are small to medium-sized spiders, measuring 3–10 mm in body length. They are characterized by modified chelicerae that bear horn-like setae and curve downward from an extension of the clypeus, covered with numerous obtuse spines used for digging. The legs curl up in preserved specimens. The carapace is narrowed anteriorly and often decorated with two bands, while the opisthosoma may be dark with a median band or pale with chevrons.

== Ecology and behavior ==
Ammoxenus species are specialist predators of harvester termites and are commonly known as sand-divers or termite-feeders. They are free-living soil dwellers typically found in soft soil dumps left by termites near nest entrances. These extremely fast-moving spiders travel rapidly over soil surfaces, moving between foraging termites and even entering termite tunnels. When disturbed, they can dive head-first into sand. They actively hunt selectively-chosen termites, kill them, and drag them into loose sand where they submerge themselves before feeding.

During inactive periods, Ammoxenus spiders retreat to sac-like shelters made in soil heaps. Females produce small, drum-like egg sacs that are concealed with the spider in these soil retreats.

== Species ==
As of September 2025, the genus contains six recognized species:

- Ammoxenus amphalodes Dippenaar & Meyer, 1980 – South Africa
- Ammoxenus coccineus Simon, 1893 – Zambia, Namibia, Botswana, South Africa (type species)
- Ammoxenus daedalus Dippenaar & Meyer, 1980 – South Africa
- Ammoxenus kalaharicus Benoit, 1972 – Botswana, South Africa
- Ammoxenus pentheri Simon, 1897 – Botswana, South Africa
- Ammoxenus psammodromus Simon, 1910 – Namibia, Botswana, South Africa
