= Ammoxenus coccineus =

Desert termite feeding spider

Conservation status
- Least Concern (SANBI Red List)

Scientific classification
- Kingdom: Animalia
- Phylum: Arthropoda
- Subphylum: Chelicerata
- Class: Arachnida
- Order: Araneae
- Infraorder: Araneomorphae
- Family: Gnaphosidae
- Genus: Ammoxenus
- Species: A. coccineus

Binomial name
- Ammoxenus coccineus Simon, 1893

Synonyms
- Ammoxenus fallopius Lawrence, 1927

Species of spider

Ammoxenus coccineus is a species of spider in the family Gnaphosidae and the type species of the genus Ammoxenus. It is found in southern Africa and is commonly known as the desert termite feeding spider.

== Etymology ==
The species name coccineus is derived from Latin, meaning "scarlet" or "deep red", likely referring to aspects of the spider's coloration.

== Distribution ==
A. coccineus has the widest distribution of any Ammoxenus species, occurring in four southern African countries: Zambia, Namibia, Botswana, and South Africa. In South Africa, it is recorded from four provinces with an extent of occurrence of 504,419 km^{2} and is found at elevations from 376 to 1,400 meters above sea level.

== Habitat and ecology ==
This free-running ground spider lives in sand mounds left by termites and is a specialist predator of harvester termites. When disturbed, individuals dive head-first into sand. The species is found in areas where harvester termites are active and occurs in Forest, Grassland, Nama Karoo, and Savanna biomes. It has been recorded from agricultural areas including cabbage fields and pistachio orchards.

== Description ==
A. coccineus shares the typical Ammoxenus morphology.

== Taxonomy ==
The species was first described by Eugène Simon in 1893 and designated as the type species of Ammoxenus. Ammoxenus fallopius Lawrence, 1927 was later synonymized with A. coccineus by Dippenaar & Meyer in 1980.

== Conservation status ==
A. coccineus is listed as Least Concern due to its wide geographical range and absence of identified threats. It receives protection in Nelshoogte Forest Reserve, Benfontein Nature Reserve, and Tswalu Kalahari Reserve.
