= Rastellus kariba =

Kariba lesser termite feeding spider

Conservation status
- Least Concern (SANBI Red List)

Scientific classification
- Kingdom: Animalia
- Phylum: Arthropoda
- Subphylum: Chelicerata
- Class: Arachnida
- Order: Araneae
- Infraorder: Araneomorphae
- Family: Gnaphosidae
- Genus: Rastellus
- Species: R. kariba

Binomial name
- Rastellus kariba Platnick & Griffin, 1990

Species of spider

Rastellus kariba is a species of spider in the family Gnaphosidae. It is found in southern Africa and is known as the Kariba lesser termite feeding spider.

== Etymology ==
The species is named after Lake Kariba, near where the type specimens were collected.

== Distribution ==
R. kariba is found in Botswana, Zimbabwe, and South Africa. The species was originally described from Zimbabwe by Norman I. Platnick and E. Griffin in 1990. In South Africa, it has been sampled from several localities in Limpopo province, at elevations from 238 to 1,528 meters above sea level.

== Habitat and ecology ==
This very small free-living ground spider is adapted to life in sandy habitats. Like other Rastellus species, it uses its rastelliform digging apparatus to excavate burrows. Specimens are frequently captured in pitfall traps, indicating active movement across the sand surface. The species likely spends much of its time buried beneath the sand.

== Description ==
Currently, only female specimens have been described.

== Conservation status ==
The species is listed as Least Concern due to its wide geographical distribution across three countries. In South Africa, it is protected in two nature reserves: Blouberg Nature Reserve and Makalali Nature Reserve, as well as in Kruger National Park.
