= Rastellus florisbad =

Florisbad lesser termite feeding spider

Scientific classification
- Kingdom: Animalia
- Phylum: Arthropoda
- Subphylum: Chelicerata
- Class: Arachnida
- Order: Araneae
- Infraorder: Araneomorphae
- Family: Gnaphosidae
- Genus: Rastellus
- Species: R. florisbad

Binomial name
- Rastellus florisbad Platnick & Griffin, 1990

Species of spider

Rastellus florisbad is a species of spider in the family Gnaphosidae. It is endemic to South Africa, where it is known as the Florisbad lesser termite feeding spider.

== Etymology ==
The species is named after Florisbad, the type locality in the Free State province where it was first collected.

== Distribution ==
R. florisbad is known from two localities in South Africa: the Florisbad Research Station in the Free State and Ndumo Game Reserve in KwaZulu-Natal. The species has a very limited known range at elevations from 140 to 1,283 meters above sea level.

== Habitat and ecology ==
This very small free-living ground dweller is adapted to life in sandy habitats. Like other Rastellus species, it uses its rastelliform digging scoop to excavate silk-lined burrows. The species has been sampled with pitfall traps from Grassland and Savanna biomes.

== Conservation status ==
The species is currently listed as Data Deficient due to its very limited known range and the need for additional sampling to determine its true distribution. It receives some protection in both known locations: the Florisbad Research Station and Ndumo Game Reserve.
