= Ammoxenus psammodromus =

Sand-loving termite feeding spider

Conservation status
- Least Concern (SANBI Red List)

Scientific classification
- Kingdom: Animalia
- Phylum: Arthropoda
- Subphylum: Chelicerata
- Class: Arachnida
- Order: Araneae
- Infraorder: Araneomorphae
- Family: Gnaphosidae
- Genus: Ammoxenus
- Species: A. psammodromus

Binomial name
- Ammoxenus psammodromus Simon, 1910

Synonyms
- Ammoxenus multosignatus Simon, 1910

Species of spider

Ammoxenus psammodromus is a species of spider in the family Gnaphosidae. It is found in southern Africa and is known as the sand-loving termite feeding spider.

== Etymology ==
The species name psammodromus is derived from Ancient Greek, meaning "sand-runner", referring to the spider's ability to move rapidly across sandy surfaces and dive into sand.

== Distribution ==
A. psammodromus is found in Botswana, Namibia, and South Africa. The species was originally described from Botswana by Eugène Simon in 1910. In South Africa, it is recorded from four provinces at elevations from 605 to 1,345 meters above sea level.

== Habitat and ecology ==
This free-running ground spider lives in sand mounds left by termites and is very fast-moving. When disturbed, individuals dive head-first into sand. They are specialist predators of harvester termites and are abundant in areas where these termites are active. The species has been recorded from Grassland, Nama Karoo, and Savanna biomes.

== Description ==
A. psammodromus possesses the typical Ammoxenus morphology. Both males and females are known for this species.

== Taxonomy ==
Ammoxenus multosignatus Simon, 1910 was synonymized with A. psammodromus by Pierre Benoit in 1972.

== Conservation status ==
The species is listed as Least Concern due to its wide geographical range and absence of known threats. It is protected in two reserves: Blouberg Nature Reserve and Malebogo Nature Reserve.
