= Austrammo =

Scientific classification
- Kingdom: Animalia
- Phylum: Arthropoda
- Subphylum: Chelicerata
- Class: Arachnida
- Order: Araneae
- Infraorder: Araneomorphae
- Family: Gnaphosidae
- Genus: Austrammo; Platnick, 2002

Type species
- A. monteithi Platnick, 2002

Species
- 4, see text

Genus of spiders

Austrammo is a genus of Australian ground spiders first described by Norman I. Platnick in 2002.

== Species ==
As of April 2019 it contains four species:

- Austrammo harveyi Platnick, 2002 – Australia (Western Australia, South Australia)
- Austrammo hirsti Platnick, 2002 – Australia (South Australia, Tasmania)
- Austrammo monteithi Platnick, 2002 – Eastern Australia
- Austrammo rossi Platnick, 2002 – Australia (Western Australia, Northern Territory)
