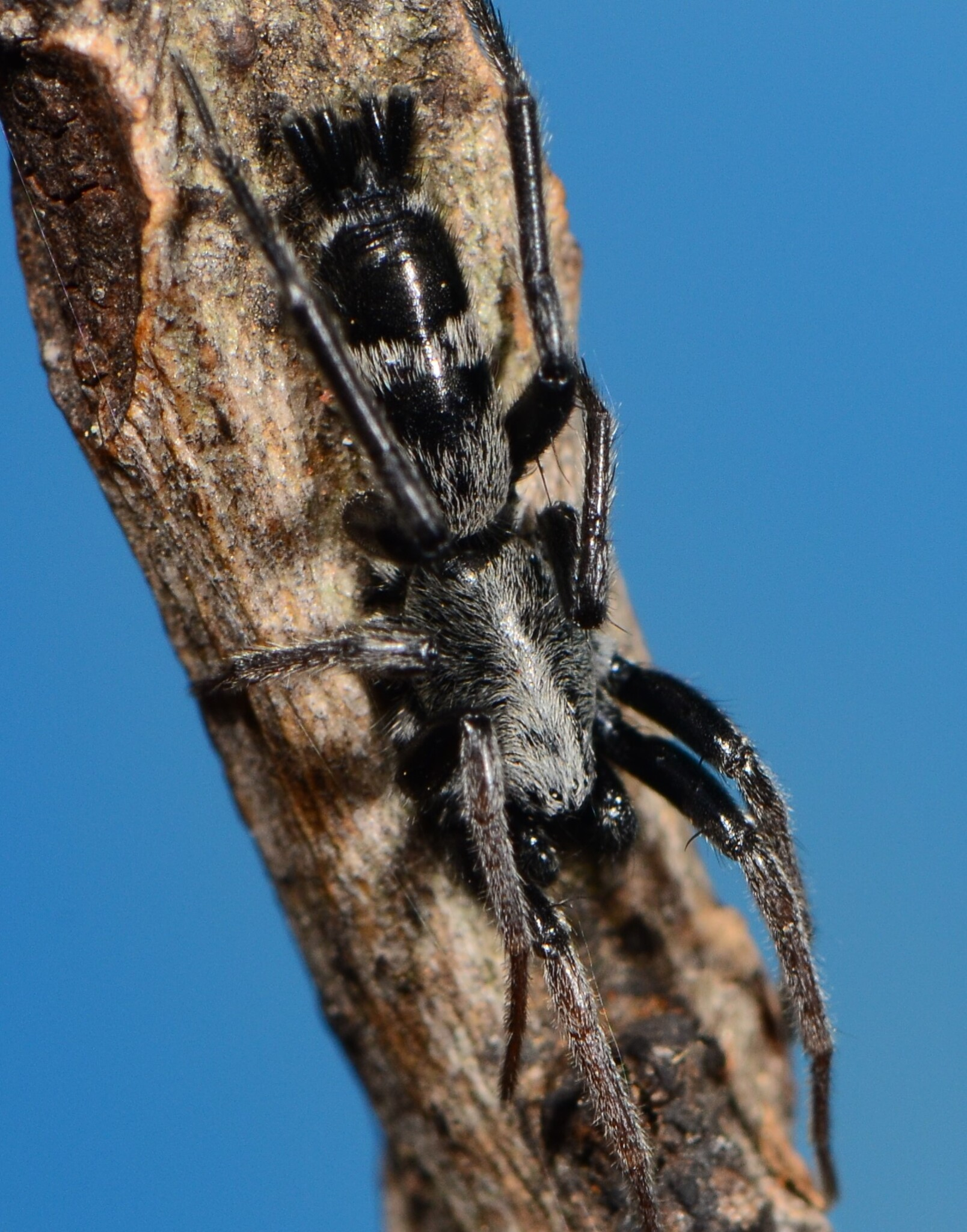
- female
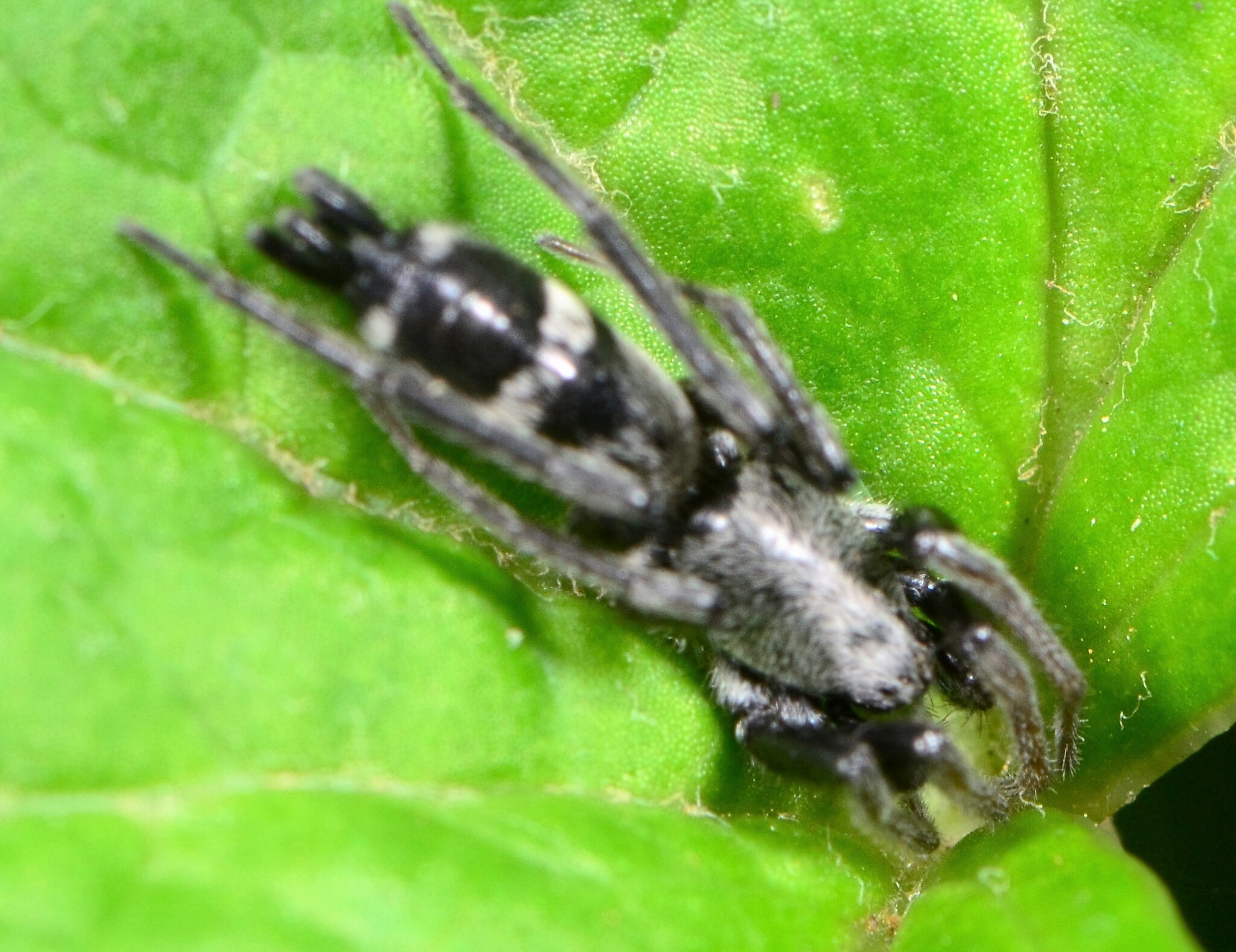
- female

Scientific classification
- Kingdom: Animalia
- Phylum: Arthropoda
- Subphylum: Chelicerata
- Class: Arachnida
- Order: Araneae
- Infraorder: Araneomorphae
- Family: Gnaphosidae
- Genus: Aphantaulax
- Species: A. inornata

Binomial name
- Aphantaulax inornata Tucker, 1923

= Aphantaulax inornata =

Common Aphantaulax Ground Spider

Species of spider

Aphantaulax inornata is a species of spider in the family Gnaphosidae. It occurs across southern Africa and is commonly known as the common Aphantaulax ground spider.

== Distribution ==
Aphantaulax inornata is distributed across Botswana, Namibia, Zimbabwe, Eswatini, and South Africa. In South Africa, the species has been recorded from six provinces, Gauteng, KwaZulu-Natal, Limpopo, Mpumalanga, Northern Cape, and Western Cape.

== Habitat and ecology ==
The species is a free-living plant dweller sampled from Fynbos, Grassland, Nama Karoo, and Savanna biomes at altitudes ranging from 119 to 1,466 m above sea level. They make their retreats in folded leaves, with the egg sac deposited in the retreat.

== Description ==
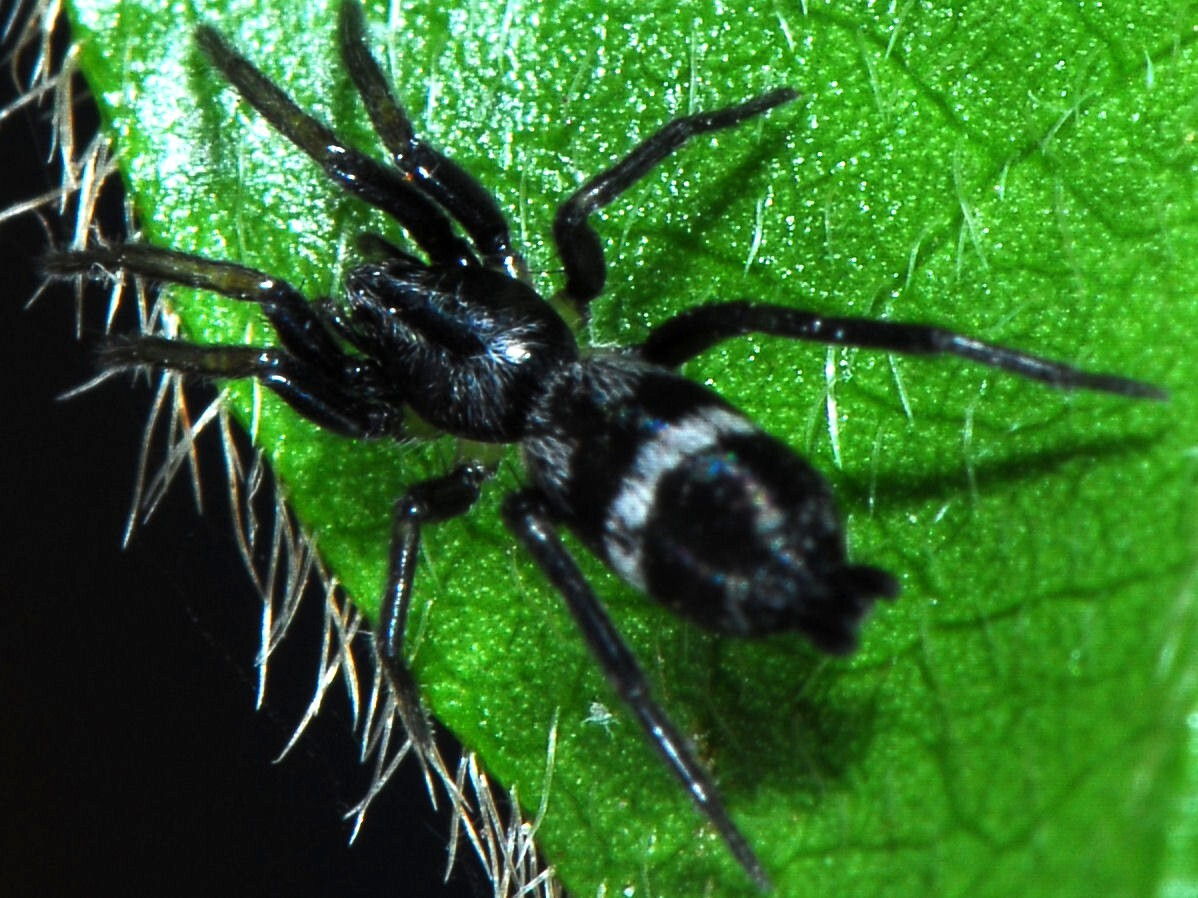
female

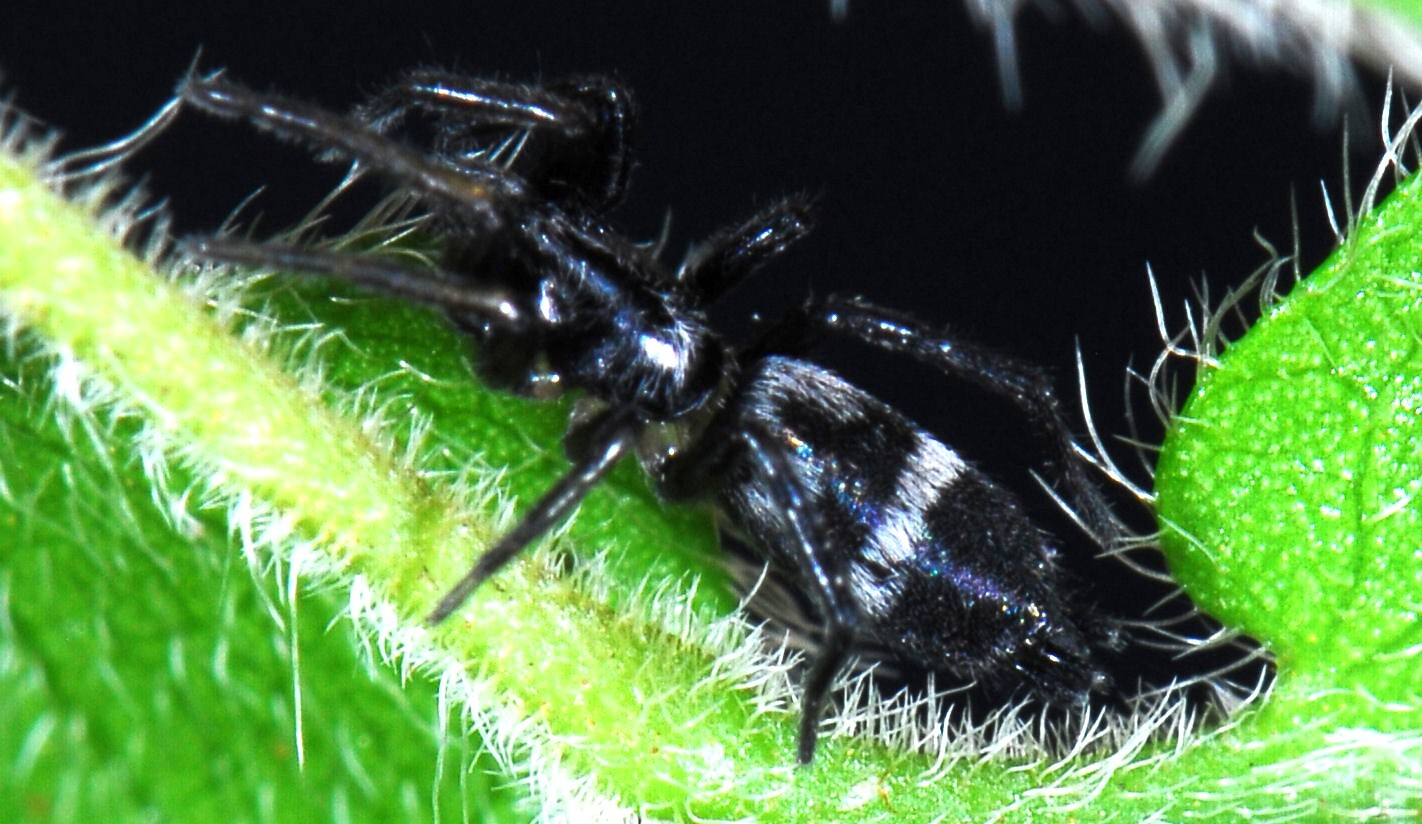
female

The carapace is dark brown, almost completely mottled black. The abdomen is black, with slight anterior lateral patches and more conspicuous median light patches covered with white hair, or obscured by brownish-black dorsal scutum. The distal portion of legs, especially tarsi, are paler. The tarsi and metatarsi of anterior pair of legs are well scopulate and tibia of pedipalp has small outer apical projection. Total length is 4 mm.

== Conservation ==
Aphantaulax inornata is listed as Least Concern by the South African National Biodiversity Institute. Although the species is presently known only from males, it has a wide geographical range. The species is protected in eight protected areas.

== Taxonomy ==
The species was originally described by R.W.E. Tucker in 1923 from Zimbabwe. It has not been revised and is known only from males.
