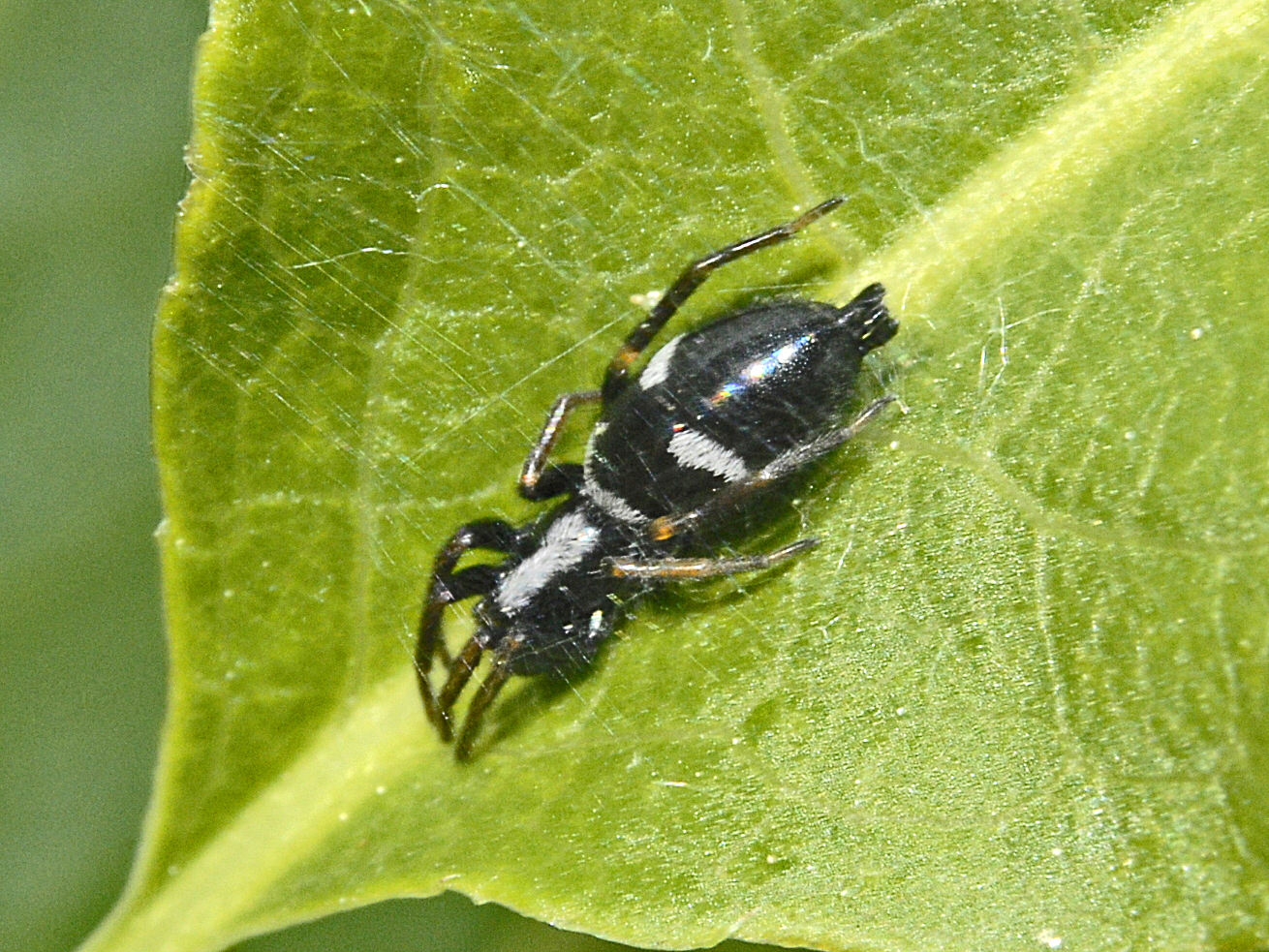

Scientific classification
- Kingdom: Animalia
- Phylum: Arthropoda
- Subphylum: Chelicerata
- Class: Arachnida
- Order: Araneae
- Infraorder: Araneomorphae
- Family: Gnaphosidae
- Genus: Aphantaulax
- Species: A. trifasciata

Binomial name
- Aphantaulax trifasciata (O. Pickard-Cambridge, 1872)

Synonyms
- Aphantaulax seminigra (Simon, 1878); Micaria trifasciata (O. Pickard-Cambridge, 1872)

= Aphantaulax trifasciata =

Species of spider

Aphantaulax trifasciata is a species of ground spider in the genus Aphantaulax, family Gnaphosidae.

== Subspecies ==
- Aphantaulax trifasciata trifasciata (O. P.-Cambridge, 1872) (Palearctic)
- Aphantaulax trifasciata trimaculata Simon, 1878 (France)

== Description ==
Aphantaulax trifasciata can reach a length of 6–10 millimetres (0.24–0.39 in) in females, of 4–7 millimetres (0.16–0.28 in) in males. The body is oblong-oval shaped, narrow and pointed at the back. The body color is black, with a broad transverse band of white hairs on the fore margin of abdomen, a second interrupted transverse band in the middle of the abdomen and a longitudinal white stripe on the cephalothorax. On the extremity of the abdomen sometimes there are two white spots. Legs are yellow-brown.

== Distribution ==
This species is present in the Palearctic realm. It is absent from Central Europe, Britain and Scandinavia.

== Habitat ==
These spiders can be found under rocks and leaves, mainly on sea coasts or riverbanks. They usually hunt at night.

== Bibliography ==
- Hu, J. L. & Wu, W. G. (1989). Spiders from agricultural regions of Xinjiang Uygur Autonomous Region, China. Shandong University Publishing House, Jinan, 435 pp.
- Kamura, T. (2009). Trochanteriidae, Gnaphosidae, Prodidomidae, Corinnidae. In: Ono, H. (ed.) The Spiders of Japan with keys to the families and genera and illustrations of the species. Tokai University Press, Kanagawa, pp. 482–500, 551-557
- Levy, G. (2002). Spiders of the genera Micaria and Aphantaulax (Araneae, Gnaphosidae) from Israel. Israel Journal of Zoology 48: 111-134.
- Murphy, J. (2007). Gnaphosid genera of the world. British Arachnological Society, St Neots, Cambs 1, i-xii, 1-92; 2:i-11, 93-605
- Roberts, M. J. (1995). Collins Field Guide: Spiders of Britain & Northern Europe. HarperCollins, London, 383 pp.
