= Aphantaulax ensifera =

Scientific classification
- Domain: Eukaryota
- Kingdom: Animalia
- Phylum: Arthropoda
- Subphylum: Chelicerata
- Class: Arachnida
- Order: Araneae
- Infraorder: Araneomorphae
- Family: Gnaphosidae
- Genus: Aphantaulax
- Species: A. ensifera

Binomial name
- Aphantaulax ensifera Simon, 1907

Species of spider

Aphantaulax ensifera is a species of ground spiders native to São Tomé and Príncipe. The species was named by Eugène Simon in 1907.

The male holotype measures up to 4 mm.
