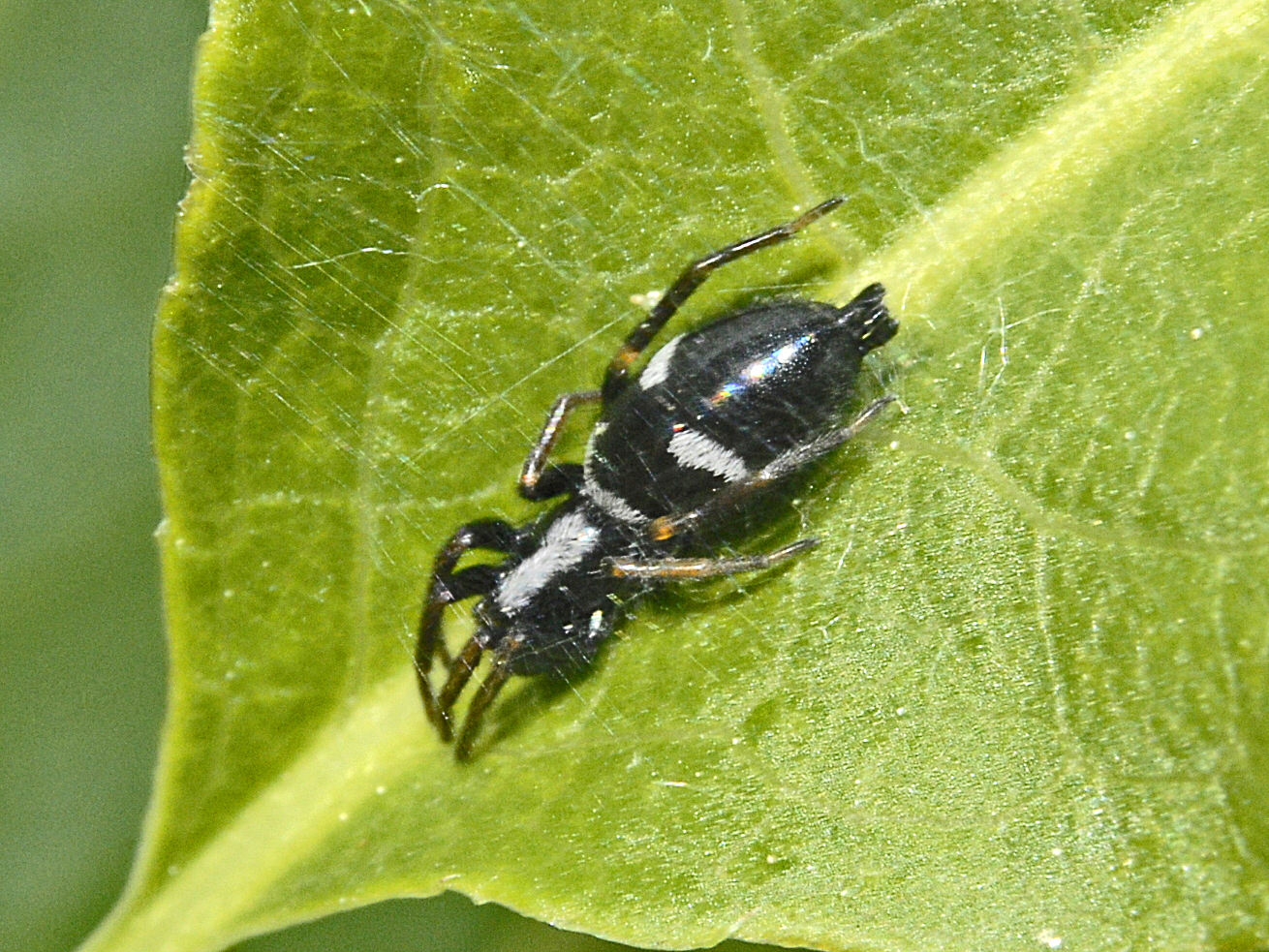
- Aphantaulax trifasciata
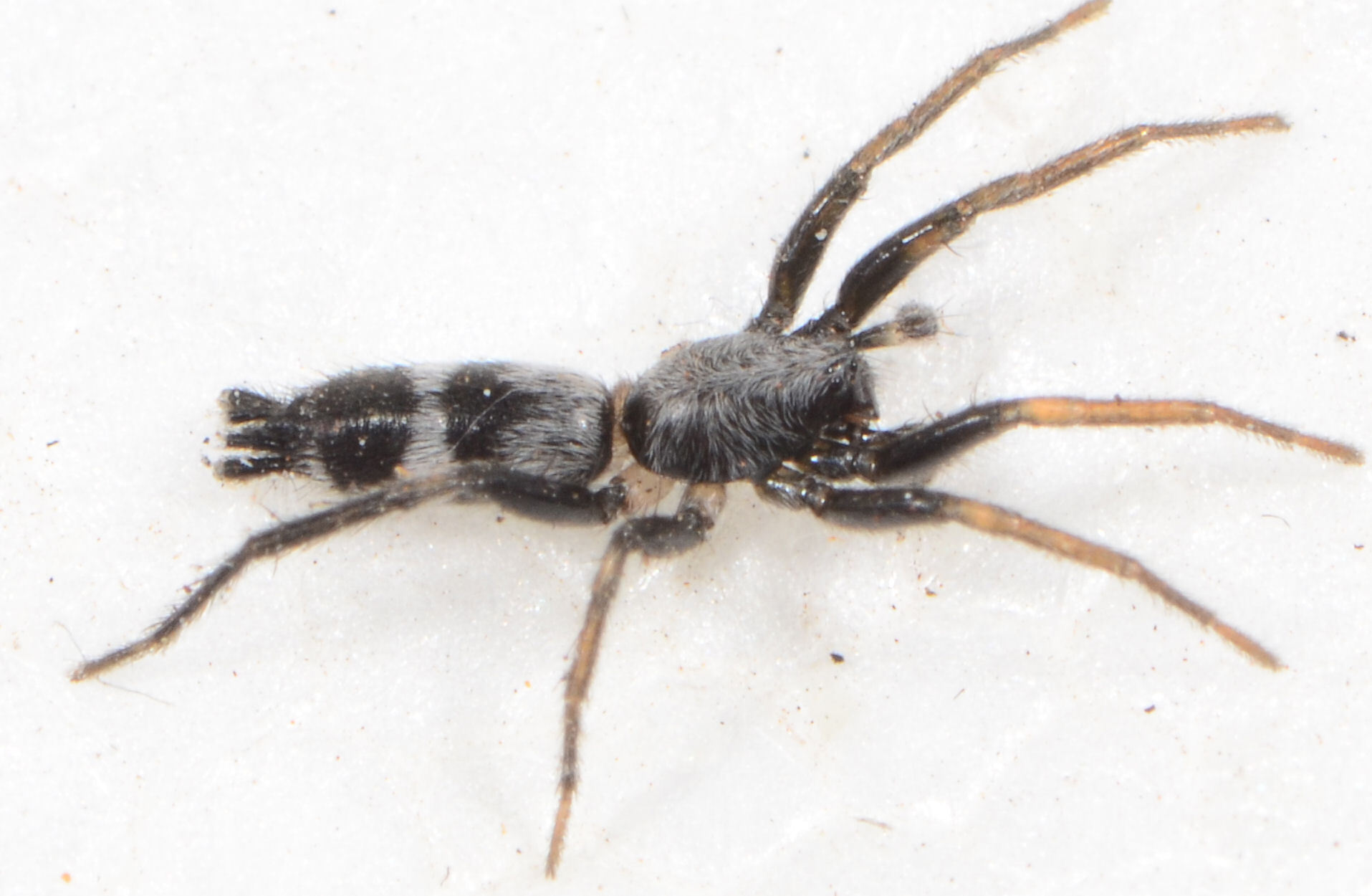
- male A. signicollis

Scientific classification
- Kingdom: Animalia
- Phylum: Arthropoda
- Subphylum: Chelicerata
- Class: Arachnida
- Order: Araneae
- Infraorder: Araneomorphae
- Family: Gnaphosidae
- Genus: Aphantaulax; Simon, 1878

Type species
- A. albini (Audouin, 1826)

Species
- 17, see text

= Aphantaulax =

Genus of spiders

Aphantaulax is a genus of ground spiders that was first described by Eugène Simon in 1878.

== Distribution ==
Spiders in this genus are mostly found in Africa and Asia, with three species found from France to Israel. One species is endemic to Australia.

== Description ==
The genus Aphantaulax consists of spiders with a total length of 5-6 mm. They are blackish coloured with a slightly attenuated carapace and dorsal light banded abdomen. The carapace is ovate, longer than wide, and blackish, furnished above with a broad median band of long whitish hairs.

The eyes are arranged in two rows with the posterior row nearly straight in dorsal view. The eyes are small, with the median eyes wide apart. The clypeus is wider than the anterior eyes. The sternum is dark and spindle shaped.

The abdomen is oblong with white bands and spots. The spinnerets are long, and males have an abdominal scutum. The body shape and colour pattern are among the diagnostic characters of the genus.

== Species ==
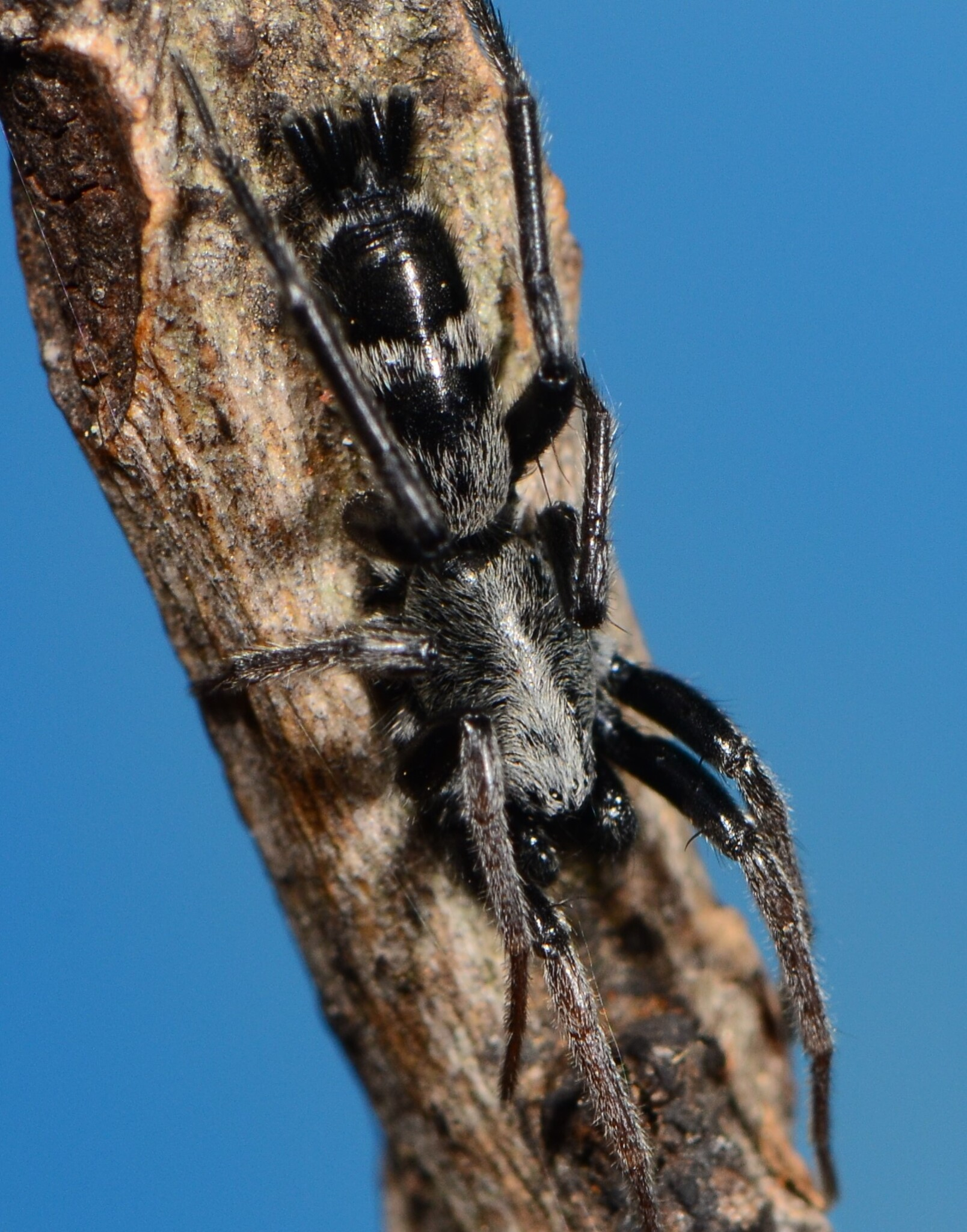
female A. inornata

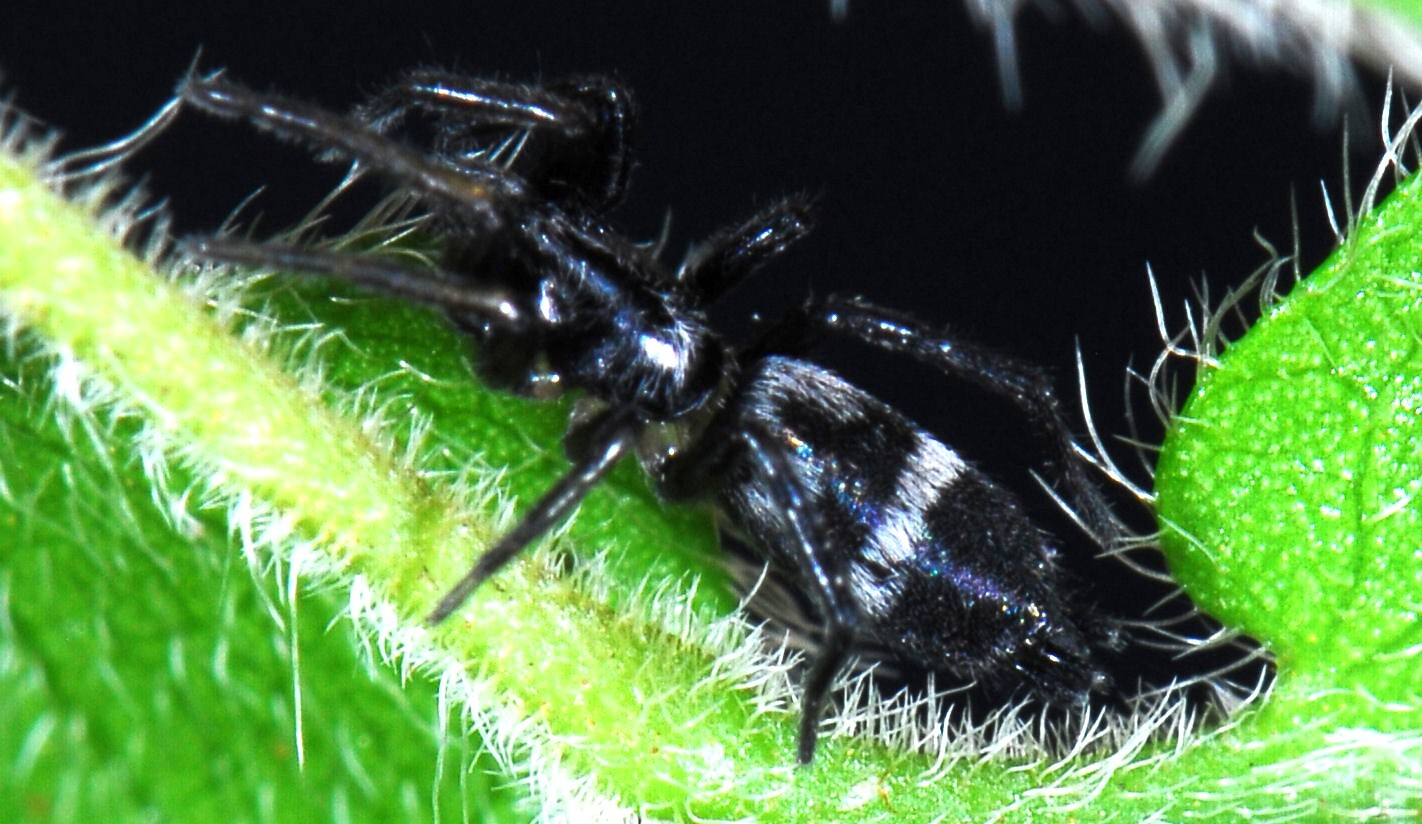
female A. inornata

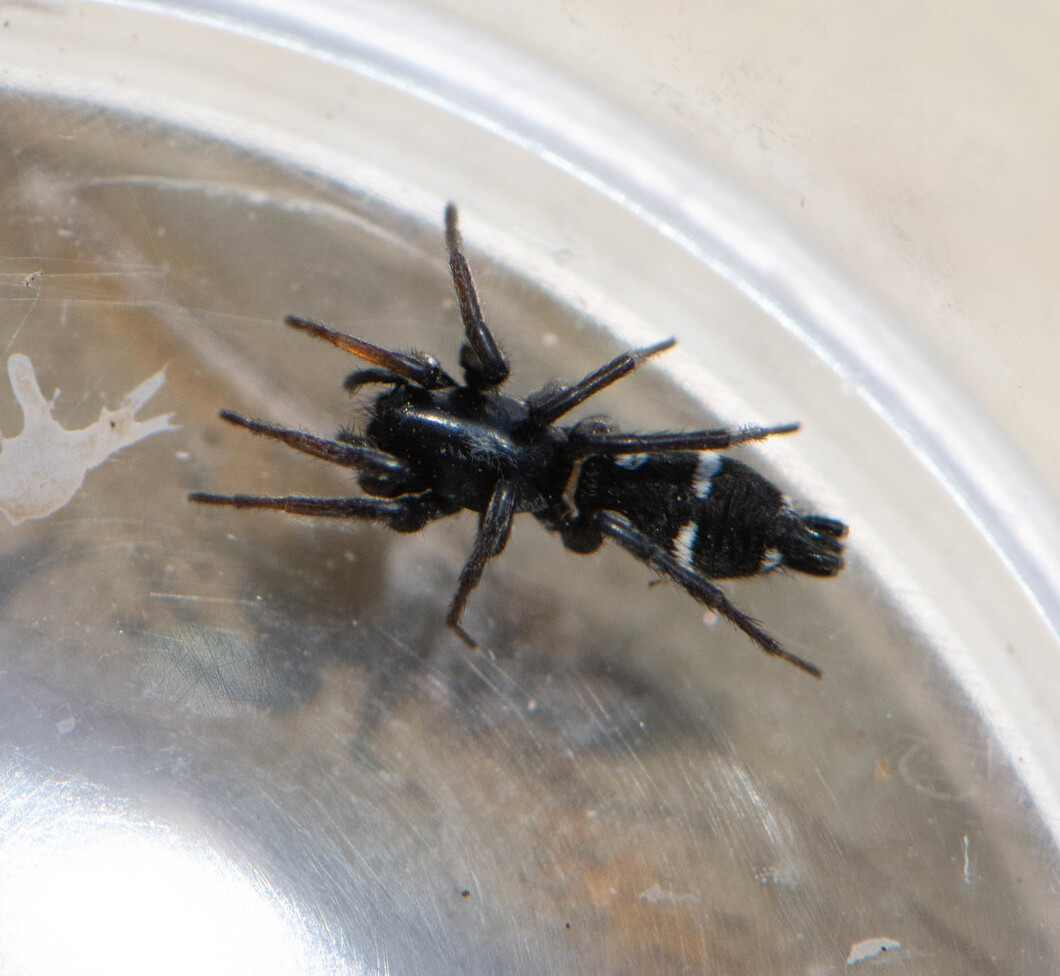
A. stationis

As of September 2025 it contains seventeen species:

- Aphantaulax albini (Audouin, 1826) (type) – Egypt, Ethiopia
- Aphantaulax australis Simon, 1893 – South Africa
- Aphantaulax cincta (L. Koch, 1866) – Europe, Turkey, North Africa, Israel
- Aphantaulax ensifera Simon, 1907 – São Tomé and Príncipe
- Aphantaulax fasciata Kulczyński, 1911 – Thailand, Indonesia (Java, Lombok)
- Aphantaulax flavida Caporiacco, 1940 – Ethiopia
- Aphantaulax inornata Tucker, 1923 – South Africa
- Aphantaulax katangae (Giltay, 1935) – Congo
- Aphantaulax rostrata Dankittipakul & Singtripop, 2013 – Thailand
- Aphantaulax scotophaea Simon, 1908 – Australia (Western Australia)
- Aphantaulax signicollis Tucker, 1923 – South Africa
- Aphantaulax stationis Tucker, 1923 – South Africa
- Aphantaulax trifasciata (O. Pickard-Cambridge, 1872) – Southern Europe, North Africa, Turkey, Israel, Caucasus, Russia (Europe) to Central Asia, China, Japan
  - Aphantaulax t. trimaculata Simon, 1878 – France
- Aphantaulax univittata Thorell, 1897 – Myanmar
- Aphantaulax voiensis Berland, 1920 – East Africa
- Aphantaulax zonata Thorell, 1895 – Myanmar
