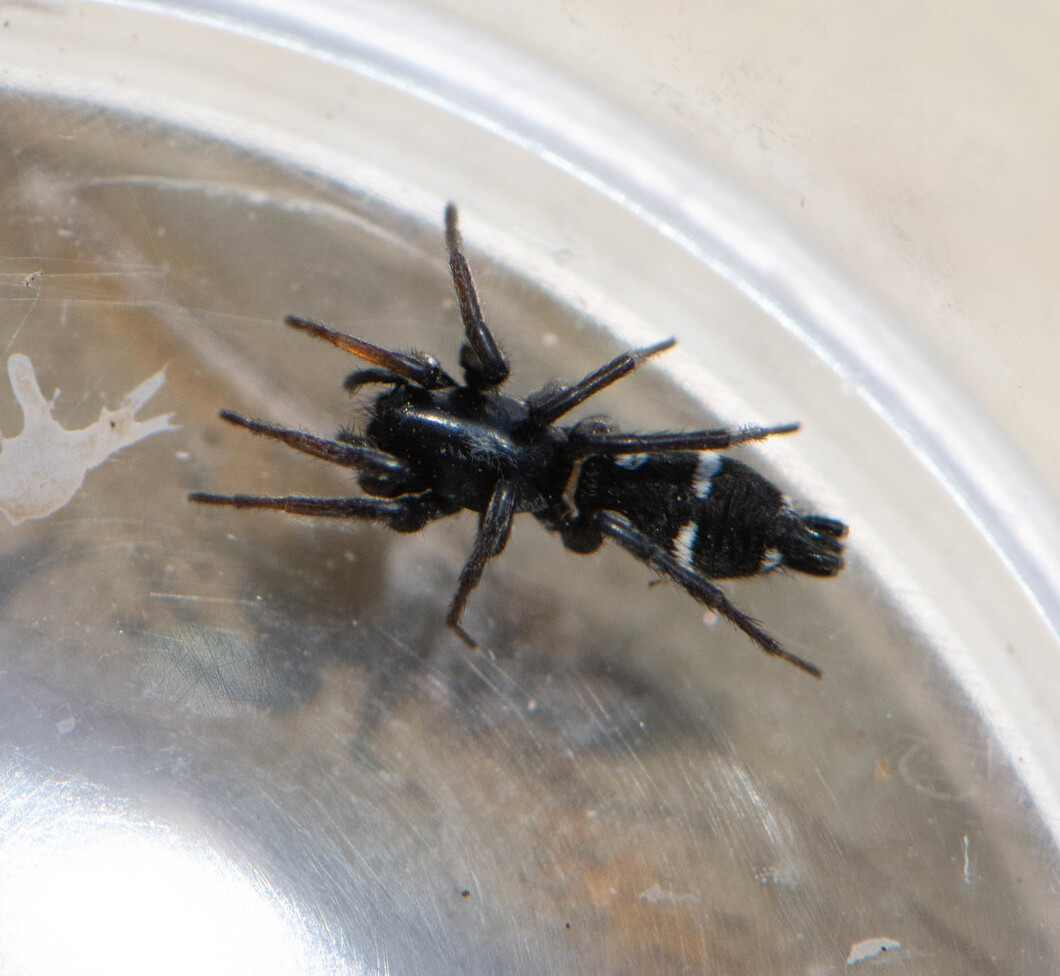

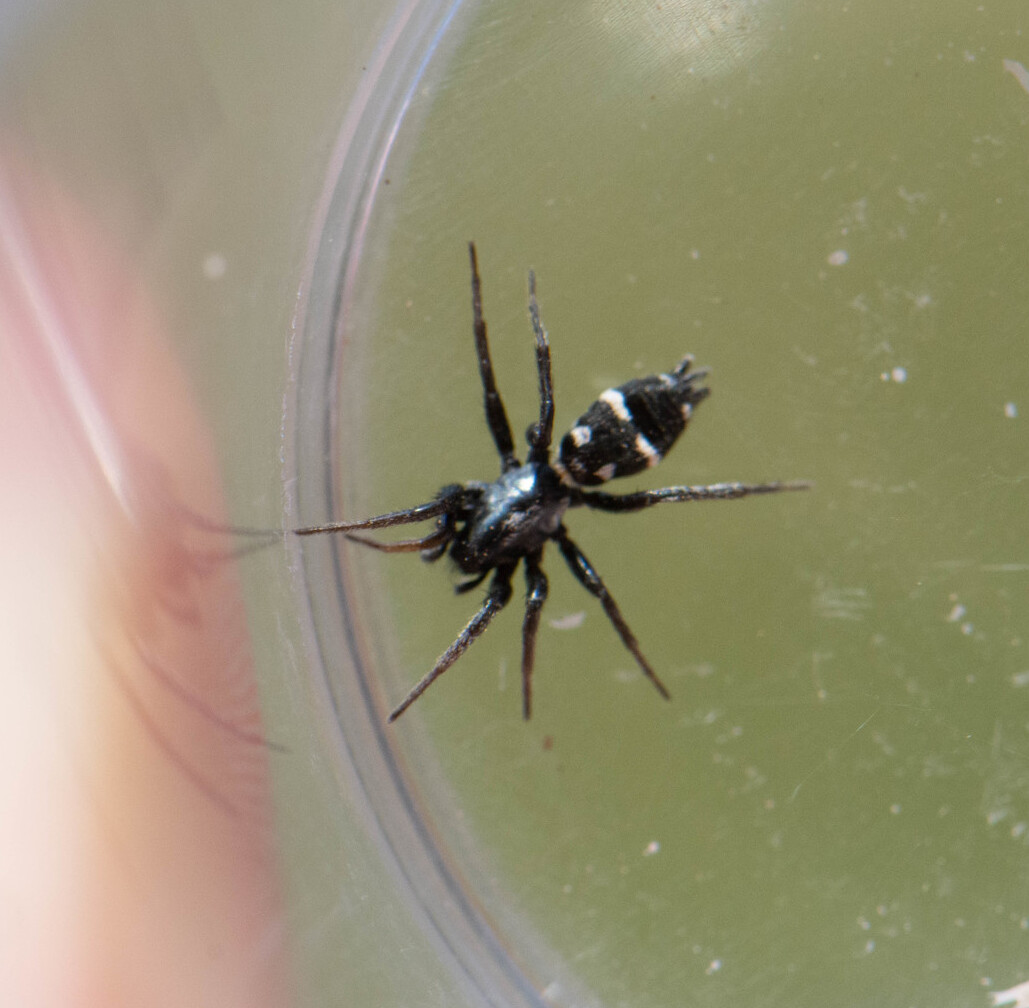

Scientific classification
- Kingdom: Animalia
- Phylum: Arthropoda
- Subphylum: Chelicerata
- Class: Arachnida
- Order: Araneae
- Infraorder: Araneomorphae
- Family: Gnaphosidae
- Genus: Aphantaulax
- Species: A. stationis

Binomial name
- Aphantaulax stationis Tucker, 1923

= Aphantaulax stationis =

Species of spider

Aphantaulax stationis is a species of spider in the family Gnaphosidae. It is endemic to southern Africa.

== Distribution ==
Aphantaulax stationis is found in Botswana and South Africa. In South Africa, the species has been recorded from two provinces, Eastern Cape and Western Cape.

== Habitat and ecology ==
The species is a free-living plant dweller sampled from Fynbos and Thicket biomes at altitudes ranging from 7 to 980 m above sea level.

== Description ==
The carapace is medium brown with darker mottling, with femora similar in colour, but legs, especially anterior pairs, lighter from patellae onwards. The abdomen is marked with white bands. Total length is 4.1-4.5 mm.

== Conservation ==
Aphantaulax stationis is listed as Least Concern by the South African National Biodiversity Institute due to its wide distribution range. The species is protected in Table Mountain National Park and De Hoop Nature Reserve.

== Taxonomy ==
The species was originally described by R.W.E. Tucker in 1923 from Hout Bay in the Western Cape. It has not been revised and is known from both sexes.
