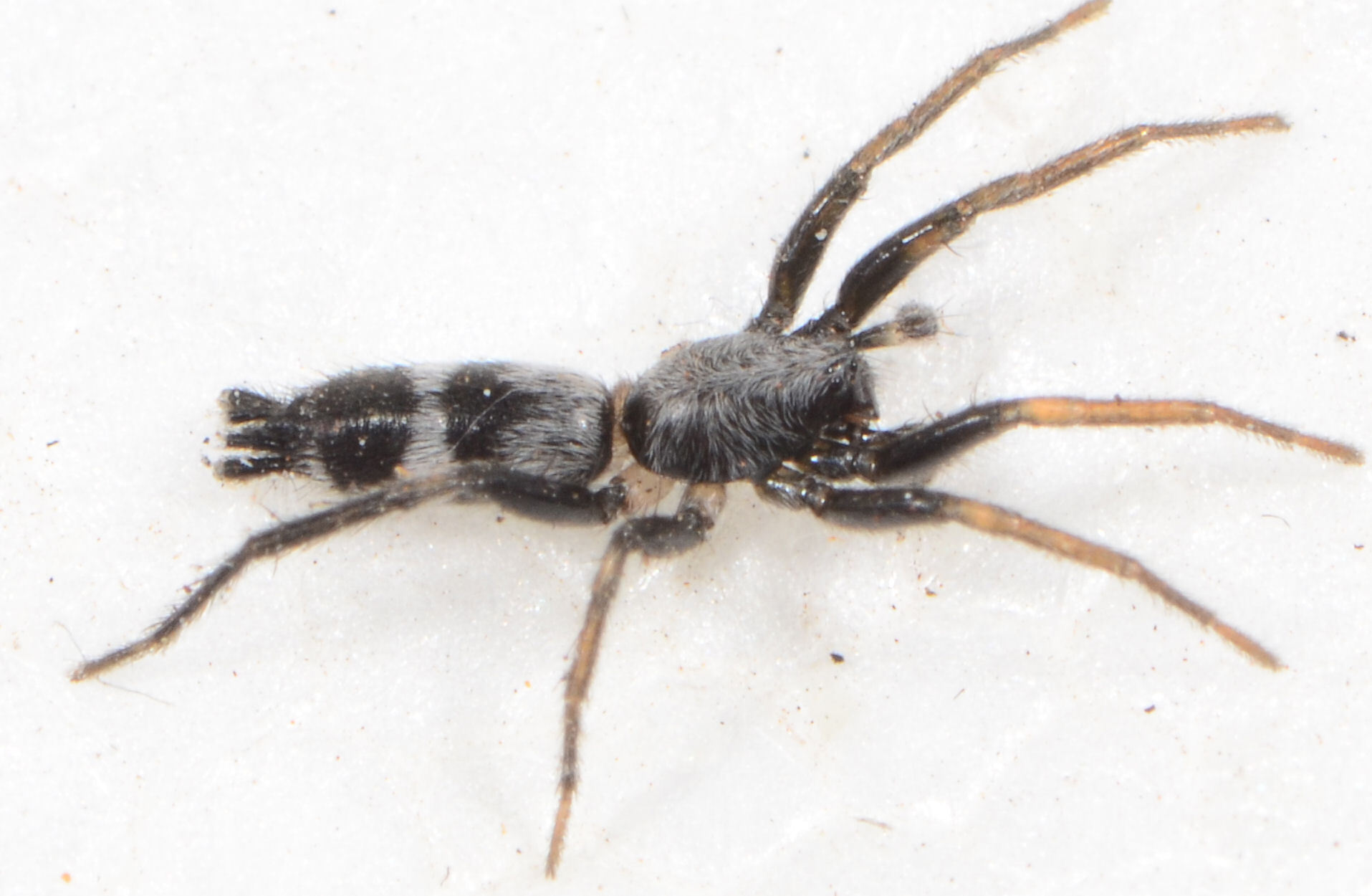
- male
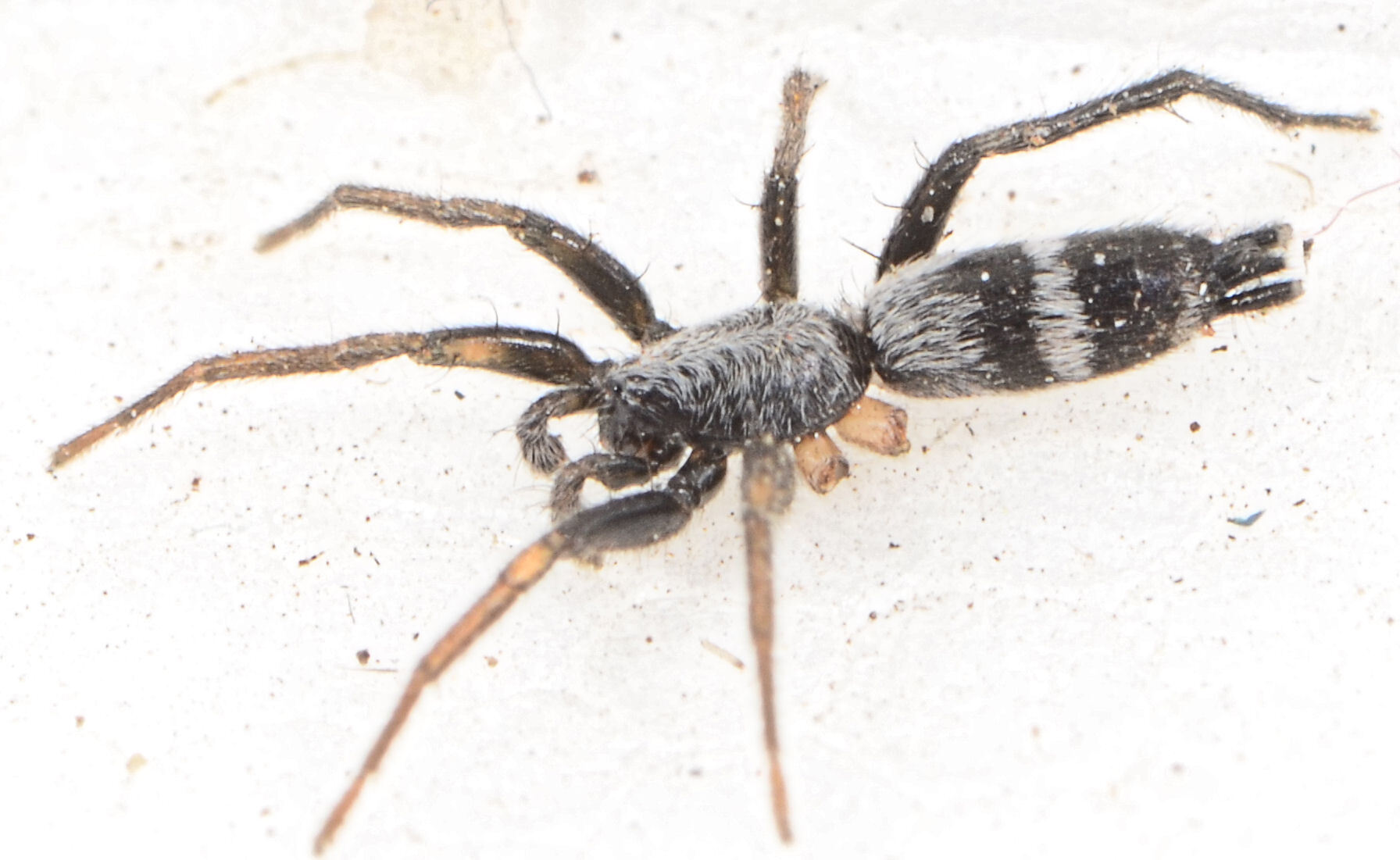
- male

Scientific classification
- Kingdom: Animalia
- Phylum: Arthropoda
- Subphylum: Chelicerata
- Class: Arachnida
- Order: Araneae
- Infraorder: Araneomorphae
- Family: Gnaphosidae
- Genus: Aphantaulax
- Species: A. signicollis

Binomial name
- Aphantaulax signicollis Tucker, 1923

= Aphantaulax signicollis =

Species of spider

Aphantaulax signicollis is a species of spider in the family Gnaphosidae. It is distributed across southern Africa.

== Distribution ==
Aphantaulax signicollis is distributed across two countries: Zimbabwe and South Africa. In South Africa, the species has been recorded from six provinces: Eastern Cape, KwaZulu-Natal, Limpopo, Mpumalanga, Northern Cape, and Western Cape.

== Habitat and ecology ==
The species is a free-living plant dweller sampled from Forest, Grassland, Indian Ocean Coastal Belt, Nama Karoo, Savanna, and Thicket biomes at altitudes ranging from 17 to 1,909 m above sea level.

== Description ==
The carapace is very dark brown, almost black, with legs similar in colour proximally and dull red brown distally. The abdomen is brownish black, with two small oblique testaceous spots anteriorly, and two long narrow oblique spots medially. Total length is 8.5 mm.

== Conservation ==
Aphantaulax signicollis is listed as Least Concern by the South African National Biodiversity Institute. Although the species is presently known only from females, it has a wide geographical range. The species is protected in several areas including Verloren Vallei Nature Reserve, Fort Fordyce Nature Reserve, Mount Coke State Forest, Hluhluwe Nature Reserve, and Cederberg Wilderness Area.

== Taxonomy ==
The species was originally described by R.W.E. Tucker in 1923 from Hanover in the Northern Cape. It has not been revised and is known only from females.
