= Aphantaulax australis =

Scientific classification
- Kingdom: Animalia
- Phylum: Arthropoda
- Subphylum: Chelicerata
- Class: Arachnida
- Order: Araneae
- Infraorder: Araneomorphae
- Family: Gnaphosidae
- Genus: Aphantaulax
- Species: A. australis

Binomial name
- Aphantaulax australis Simon, 1893

Species of spider

Aphantaulax australis is a species of spider in the family Gnaphosidae. It is endemic to the Eastern Cape of South Africa.

== Distribution ==
Aphantaulax australis is endemic to the Eastern Cape province of South Africa. It has been recorded from Port Elizabeth and Addo Elephant National Park.

== Habitat and ecology ==
The species is a free-living plant dweller sampled from the Thicket biome at 7 m above sea level.

== Description ==
The carapace is blackish, furnished above with broad median band of long whitish hairs. The abdomen is oblong, rounded anteriorly, posteriorly obtusely truncate with dorsal surface black and shiny. It is furnished anteriorly with large spots, and near middle on each side with transversely elongate spots, and posteriorly above spinnerets with a transversely elongate spot, all ornamented with white hairs. The tarsi and metatarsi of anterior pair of legs are sparsely scopulate. Total length is 5 mm.

== Conservation ==
Aphantaulax australis is listed as Data Deficient for taxonomic reasons. The species is protected in the Addo Elephant National Park. More sampling is needed to collect females and determine the species' range.

== Taxonomy ==
The species was originally described by Eugène Simon in 1893 from Port Elizabeth. It has not been revised and is known only from males.
