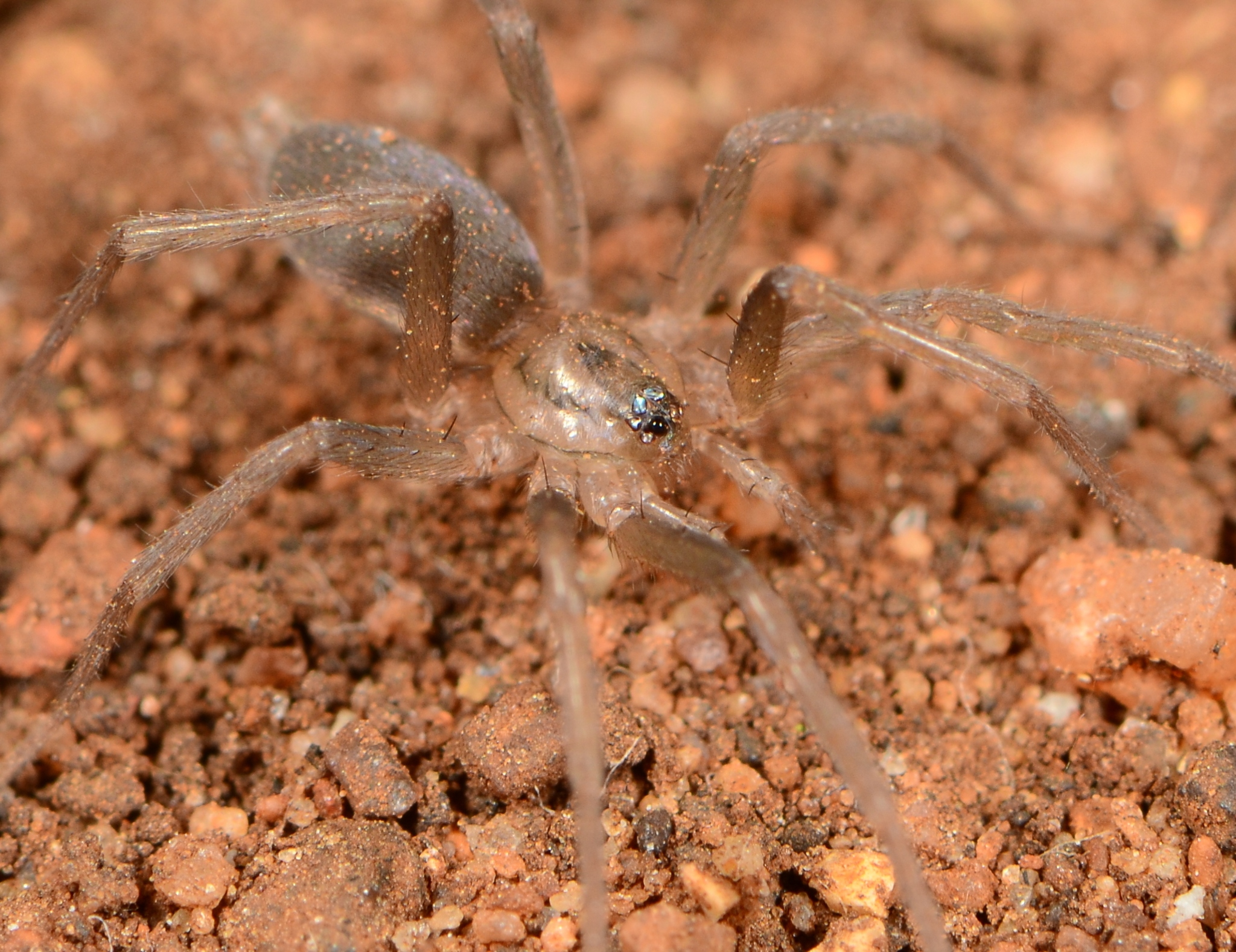
- female
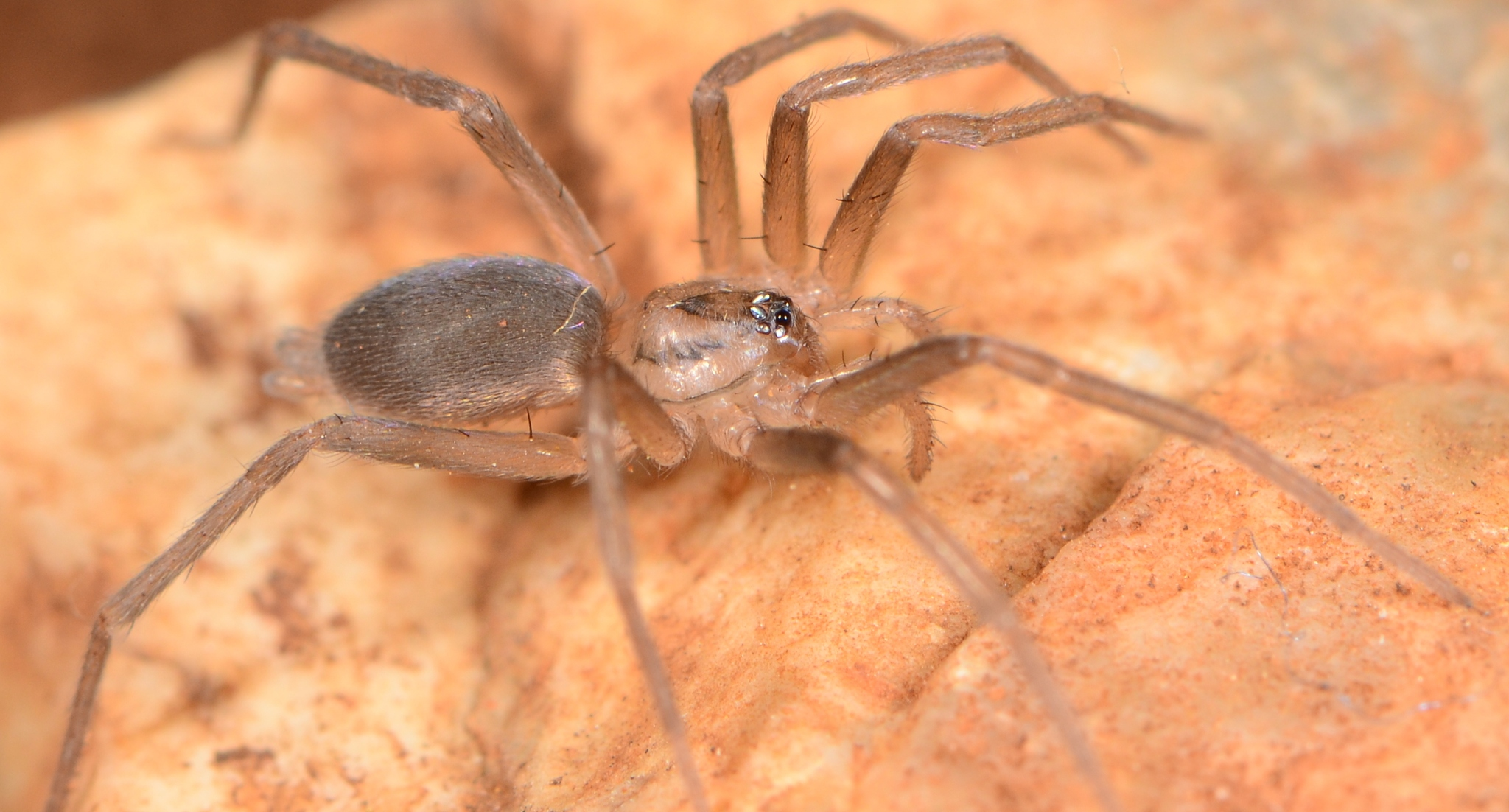
- female

Scientific classification
- Kingdom: Animalia
- Phylum: Arthropoda
- Subphylum: Chelicerata
- Class: Arachnida
- Order: Araneae
- Infraorder: Araneomorphae
- Family: Gnaphosidae
- Genus: Megamyrmaekion
- Species: M. transvaalense

Binomial name
- Megamyrmaekion transvaalense Tucker, 1923

= Megamyrmaekion transvaalense =

Transvaal's Curly-Legged Ground Spider

Species of spider

Megamyrmaekion transvaalense is a species of spider in the family Gnaphosidae. It is endemic to South Africa and is commonly known as Transvaal's curly-legged ground spider.

== Distribution ==
Megamyrmaekion transvaalense has a wide distribution across South Africa, occurring in Eastern Cape, Free State, Gauteng, Limpopo, Mpumalanga, North West, Northern Cape, and Western Cape.

== Habitat and ecology ==
The species is a free-living ground dweller found in Grassland, Nama Karoo, and Savanna biomes at altitudes ranging from 24 to 1,730 m above sea level. It has also been sampled from agricultural areas including citrus, cotton, and pistachio crops.

== Description ==
Only the female of M. transvaalense is known. The spider has a uniform pale testaceous colouration with the integument covered in appressed dark pubescence. The legs are armed with black spines. The fovea is long and dark with slight dark radiations on the surface. Total length excluding spinnerets is 7-9 mm.

== Conservation ==
Megamyrmaekion transvaalense is listed as Least Concern due to its wide range across South Africa. The species is protected in several protected areas including Klipriviersberg Nature Reserve, Kruger National Park, Luvhondo Nature Reserve, and Benfontein Game Reserve.

== Taxonomy ==
The species was described by Tucker in 1923 from the North West Province. It has not been revised since the original description.
