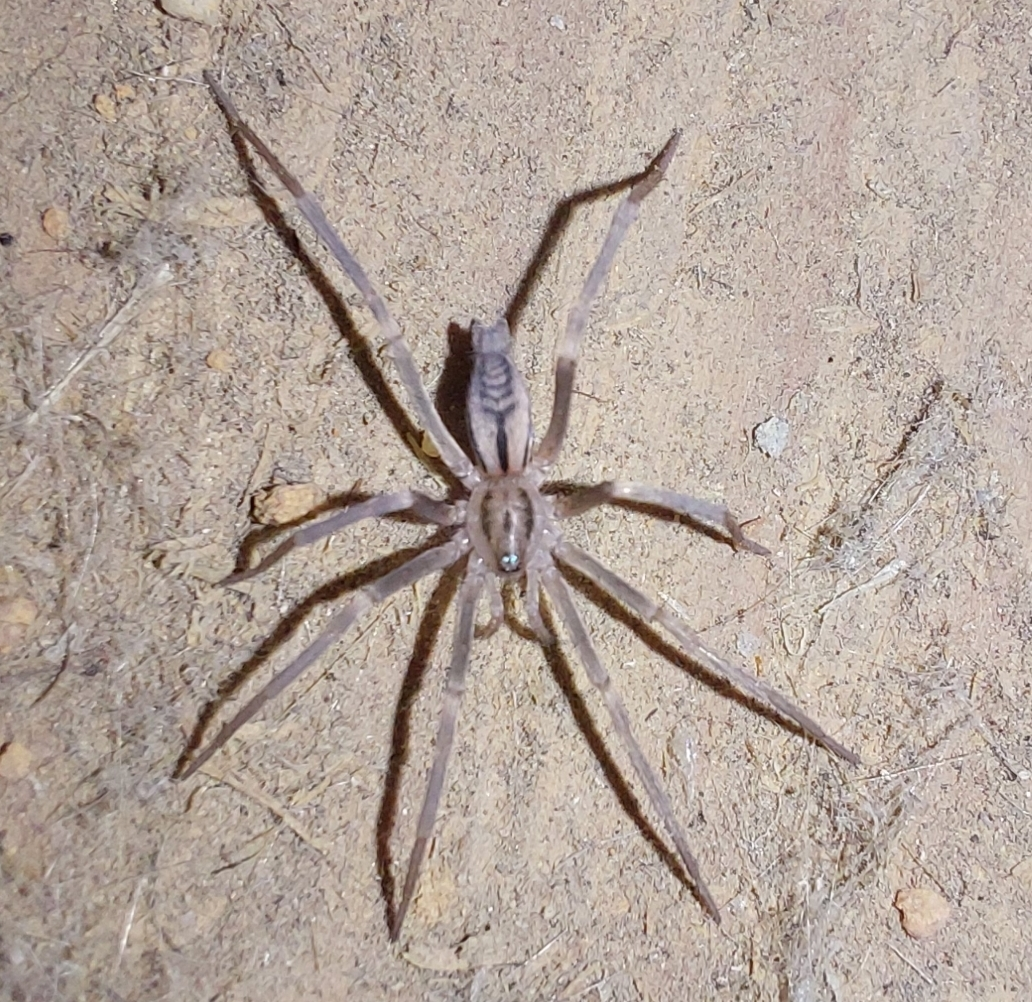

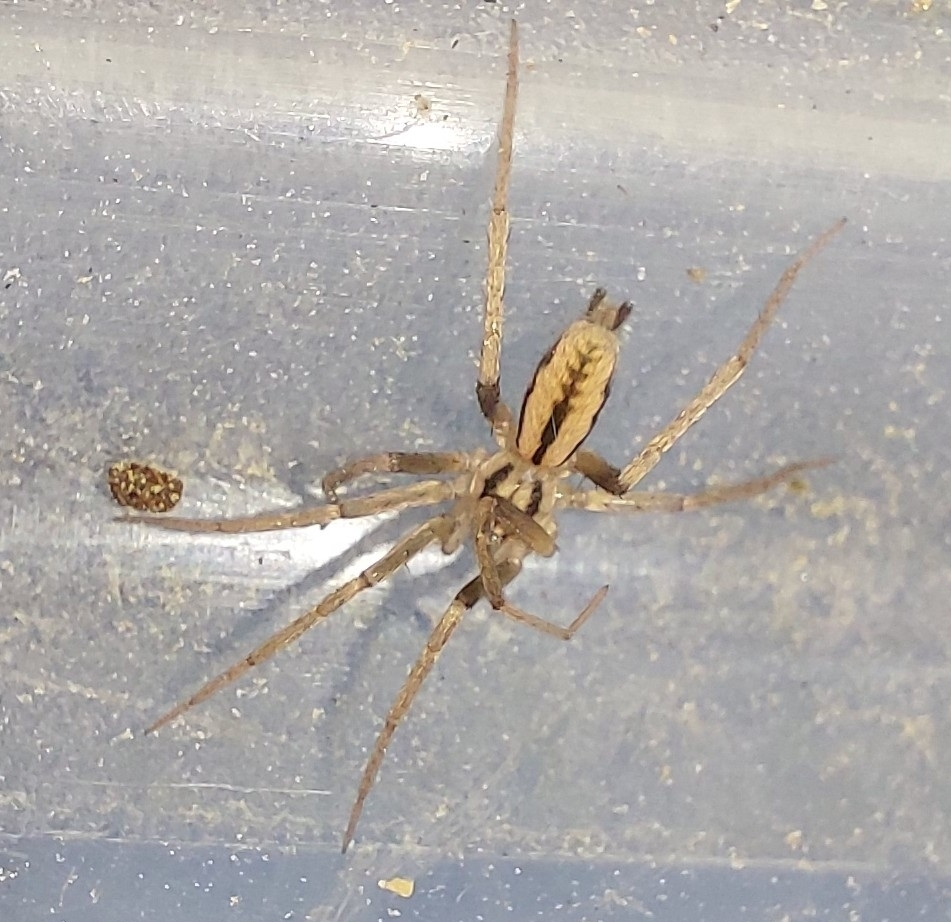

Scientific classification
- Kingdom: Animalia
- Phylum: Arthropoda
- Subphylum: Chelicerata
- Class: Arachnida
- Order: Araneae
- Infraorder: Araneomorphae
- Family: Gnaphosidae
- Genus: Megamyrmaekion
- Species: M. schreineri

Binomial name
- Megamyrmaekion schreineri Tucker, 1923

= Megamyrmaekion schreineri =

Schreiner's Curly-Legged Ground Spider

Species of spider

Megamyrmaekion schreineri is a species of spider in the family Gnaphosidae. It occurs in southern Africa and is commonly known as Schreiner's curly-legged ground spider.

== Distribution ==
Megamyrmaekion schreineri has a wide distribution across southern Africa. It is recorded from Namibia and five provinces of South Africa: Free State, Mpumalanga, Northern Cape, North West, and Western Cape, ranging from 7 to 1,385 m above sea level.

== Habitat and ecology ==
The species is a free-living ground dweller found in multiple biomes including Fynbos, Grassland, Nama Karoo, and Savanna biomes.

== Description ==
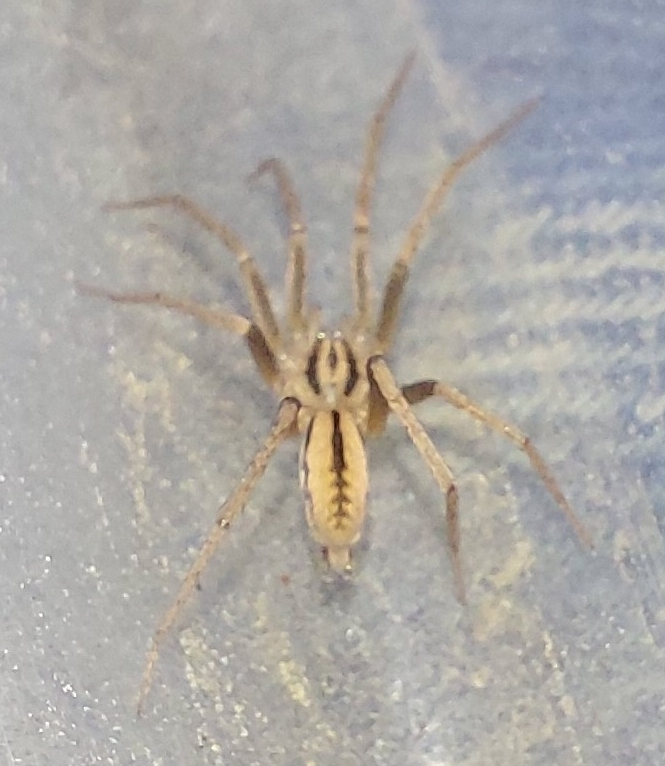

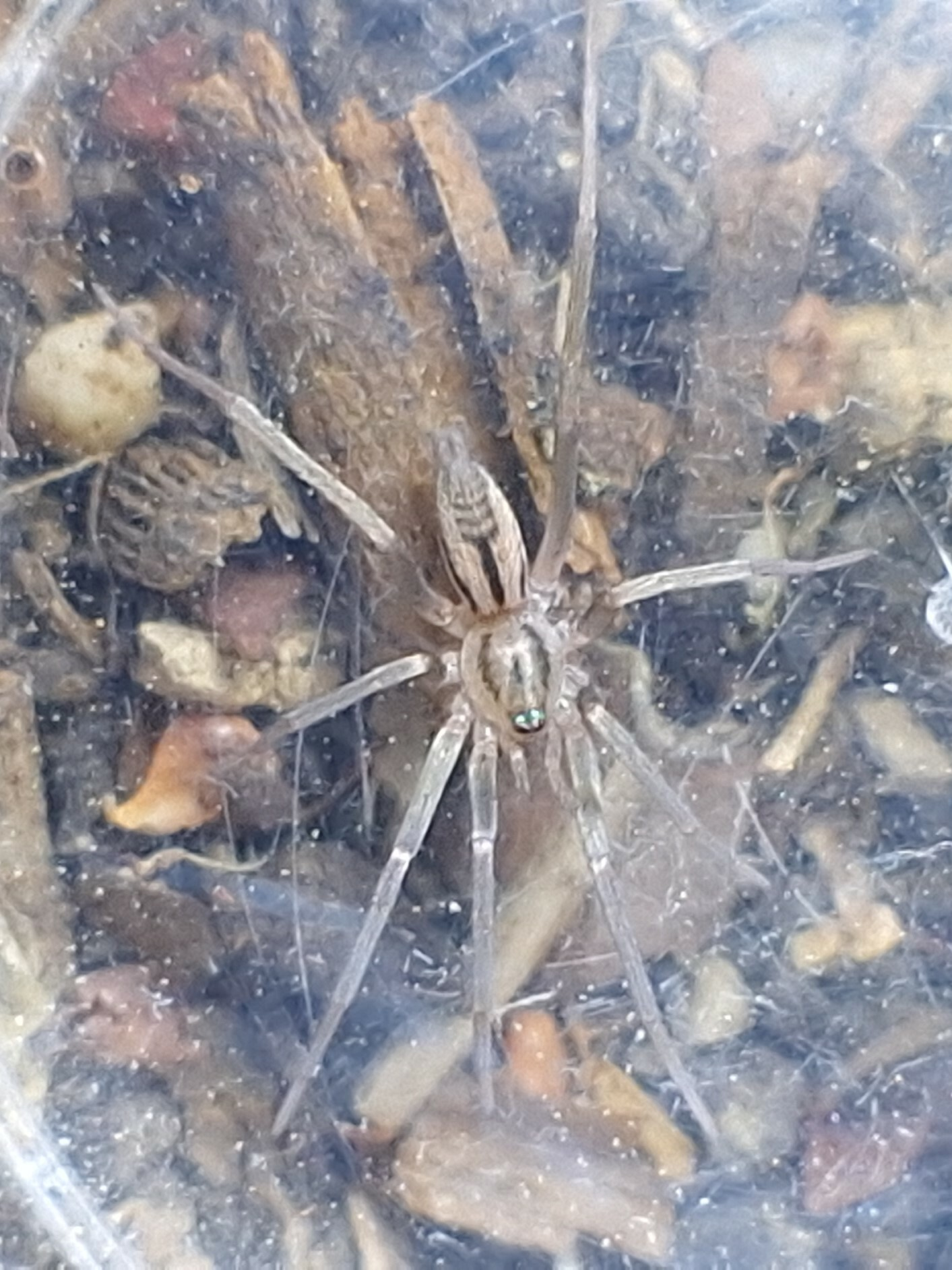

Only the male of M. schreineri is known. The carapace and legs are light yellowish-brown with faint bands between the border and centre. The abdomen is testaceous and covered with tawny pubescence. The sternum has dark rimming. Total length is 8 mm.

== Conservation ==
Megamyrmaekion schreineri is listed as Least Concern due to its wide range across southern Africa. The species is protected in ten protected areas including the Cederberg Wilderness Area, De Hoop Nature Reserve, and Tswalu Kalahari Reserve.

== Taxonomy ==
The species was described by Tucker in 1923 from Hanover in the Northern Cape. It has not been revised since the original description.
