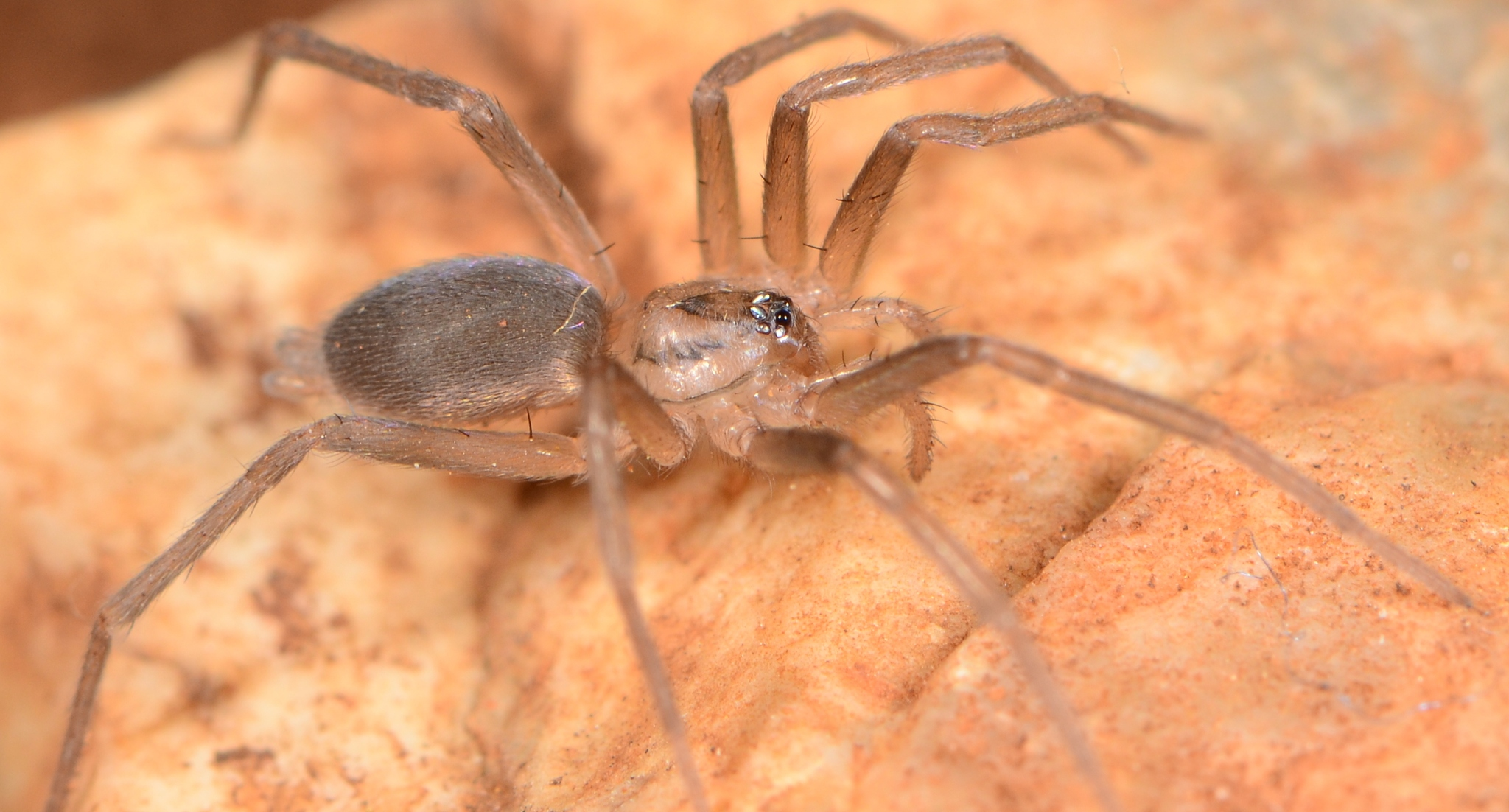
- female M. transvaalense
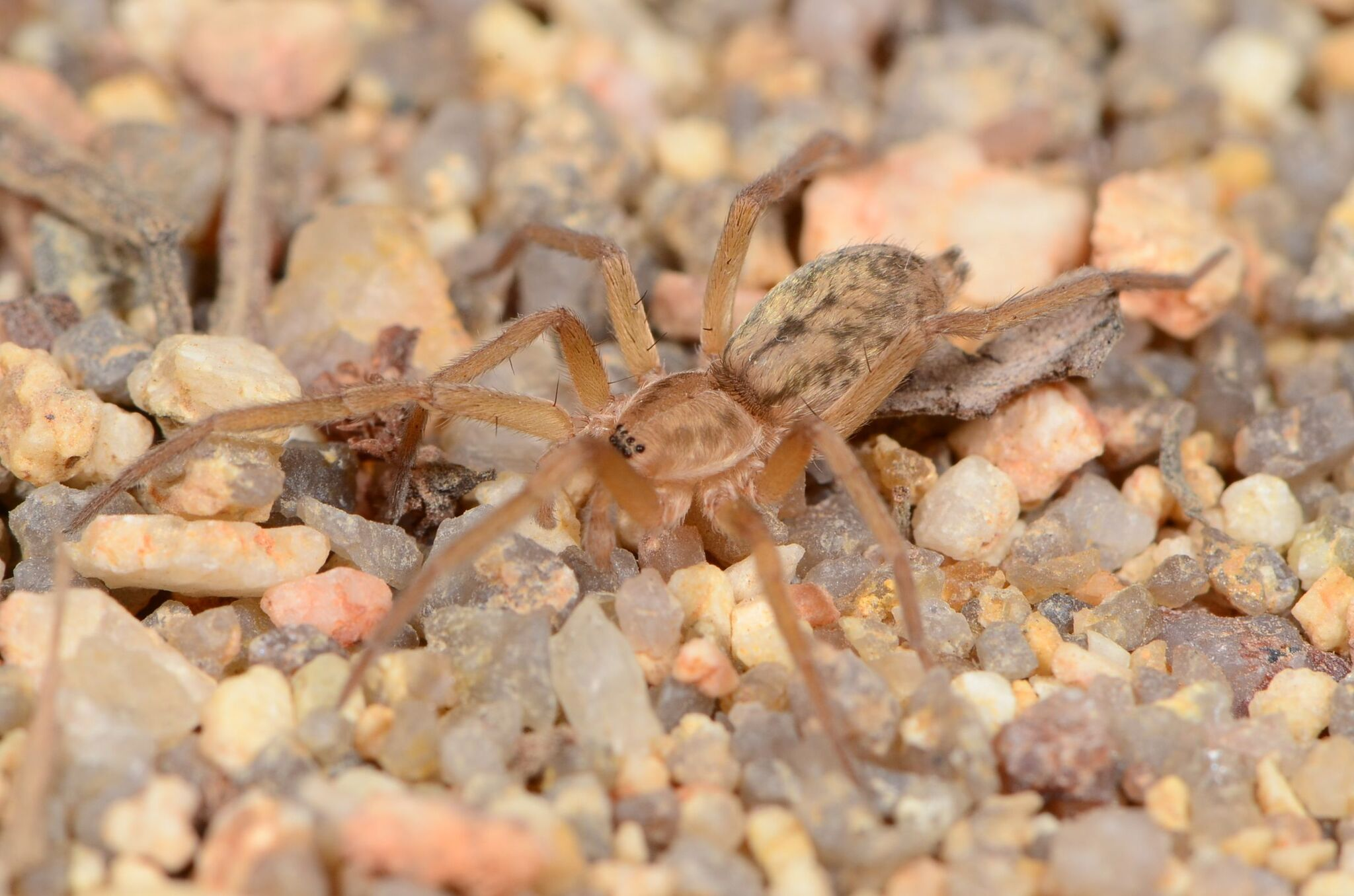
- female M. velox

Scientific classification
- Kingdom: Animalia
- Phylum: Arthropoda
- Subphylum: Chelicerata
- Class: Arachnida
- Order: Araneae
- Infraorder: Araneomorphae
- Family: Gnaphosidae
- Genus: Megamyrmaekion; Reuss, 1834

Type species
- M. caudatum Reuss, 1834

Species
- 12, see text

= Megamyrmaekion =

Genus of spiders

Megamyrmaekion is a genus of ground spiders that was first described by A. Reuss in 1834.

== Species ==
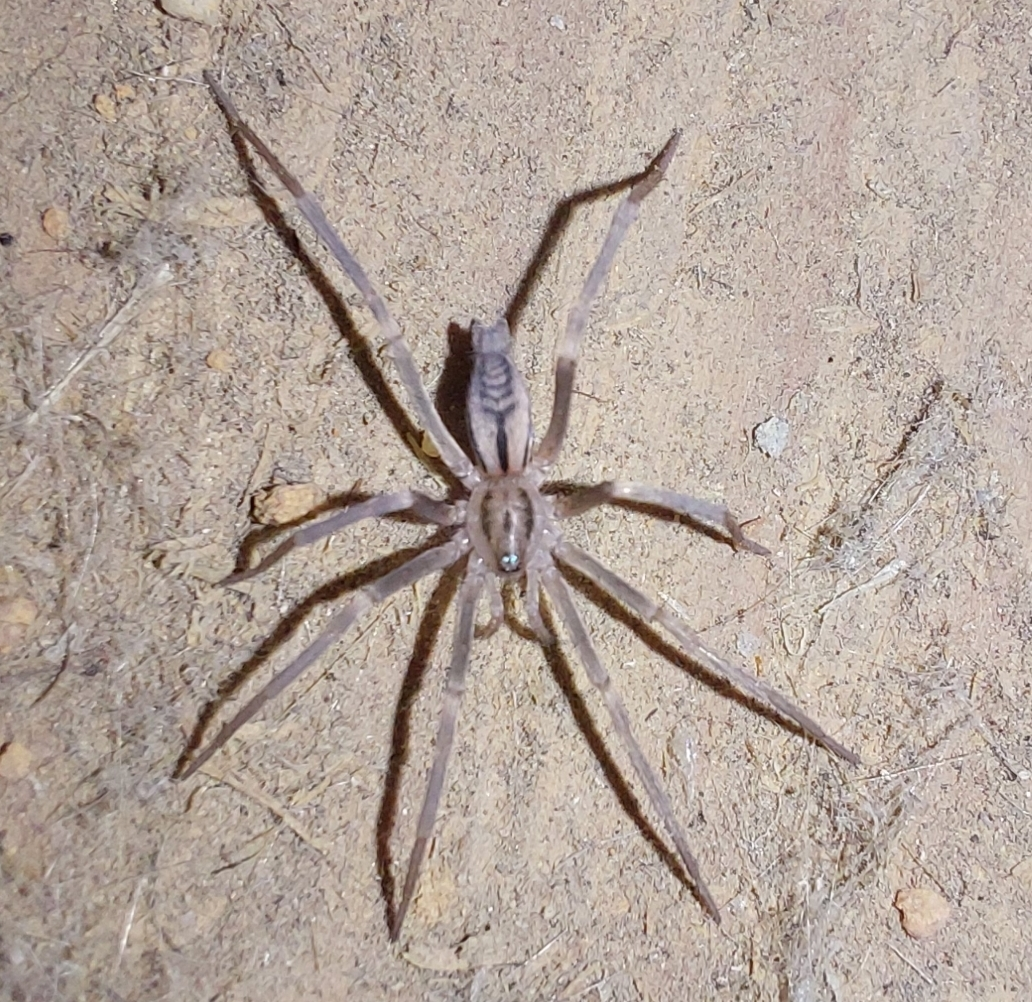
M. schreineri

As of September 2025, this genus includes 12 species:

- Megamyrmaekion algericum Simon, 1885 – Algeria, Tunisia
- Megamyrmaekion austrinum Simon, 1908 – Australia (Western Australia)
- Megamyrmaekion caudatum Reuss, 1834 – Algeria, Tunisia, Libya, Egypt, Israel, Iran, India (type species)
- Megamyrmaekion hula Levy, 2009 – Israel
- Megamyrmaekion magshimim Levy, 2009 – Israel
- Megamyrmaekion nairobii Berland, 1920 – Kenya
- Megamyrmaekion pritiae (Tikader, 1982) – India
- Megamyrmaekion schreineri Tucker, 1923 – Namibia, South Africa
- Megamyrmaekion tikaderi (Gajbe, 1987) – India
- Megamyrmaekion transvaalense Tucker, 1923 – South Africa
- Megamyrmaekion velox Simon, 1887 – Namibia, South Africa
- Megamyrmaekion vulpinum (O. Pickard-Cambridge, 1874) – Niger, Egypt
