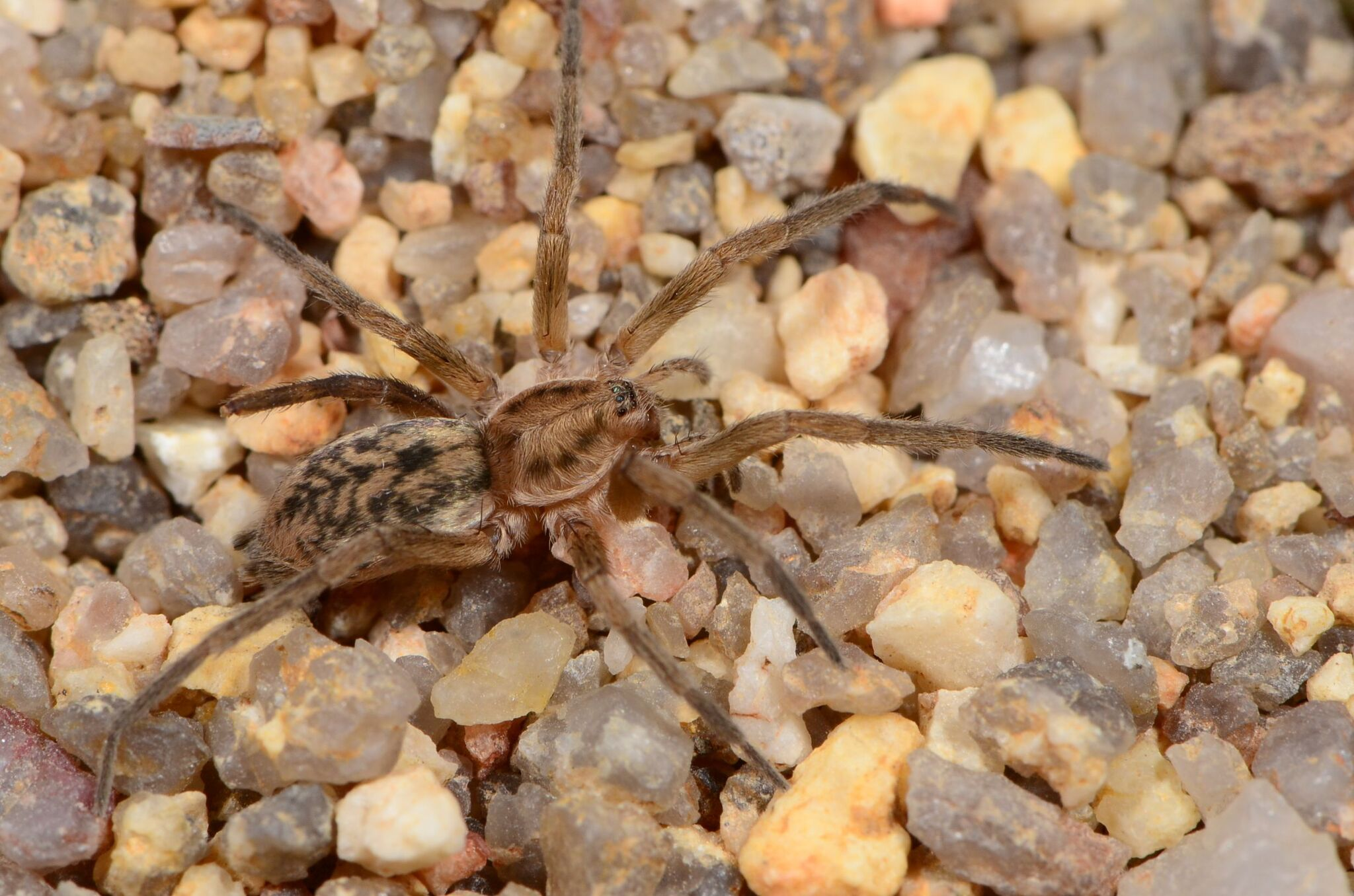
- adult female
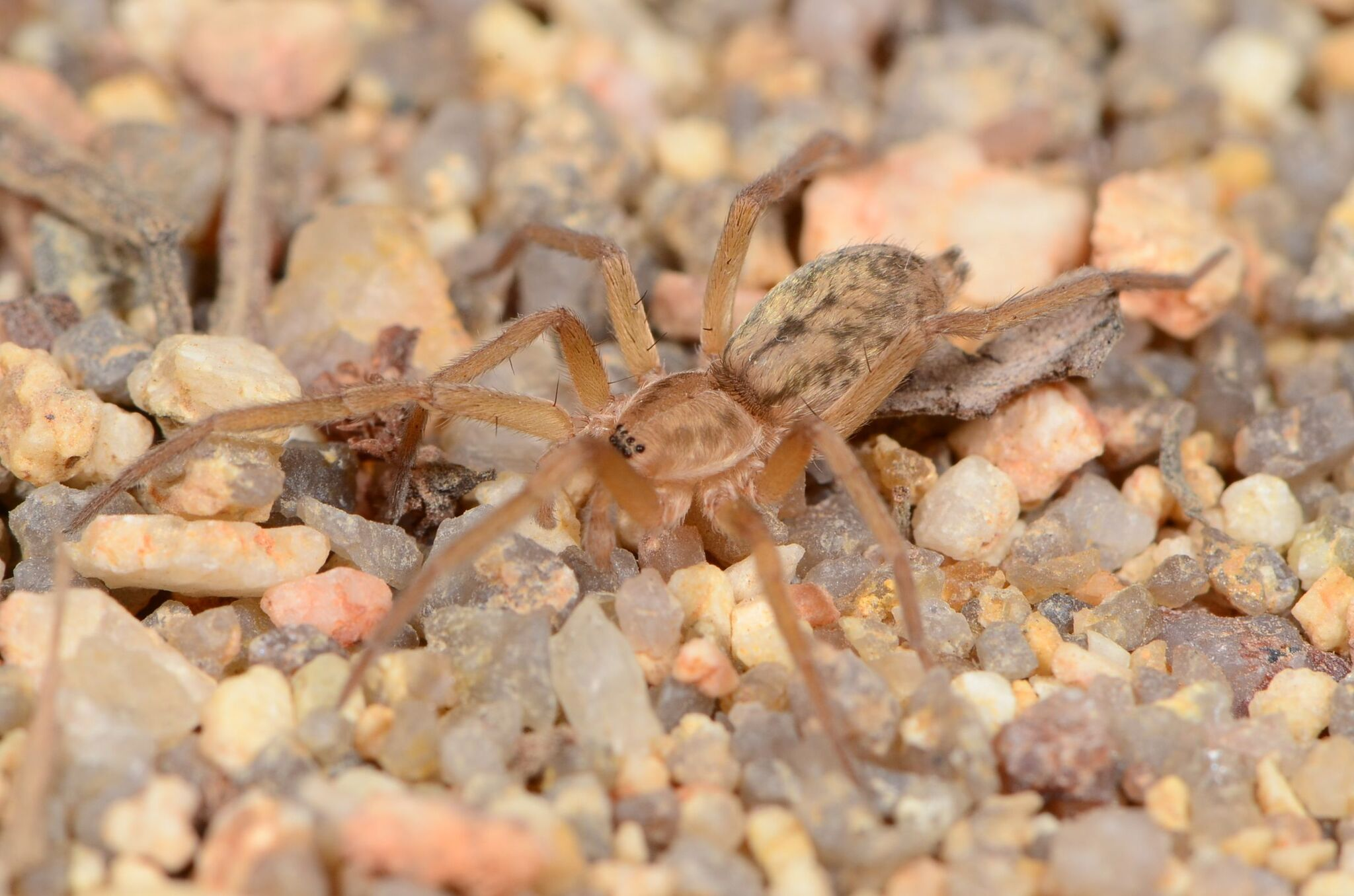
- adult female

Scientific classification
- Kingdom: Animalia
- Phylum: Arthropoda
- Subphylum: Chelicerata
- Class: Arachnida
- Order: Araneae
- Infraorder: Araneomorphae
- Family: Gnaphosidae
- Genus: Megamyrmaekion
- Species: M. velox

Binomial name
- Megamyrmaekion velox Simon, 1887

= Megamyrmaekion velox =

Kalahari Curly-Legged Ground Spider

Species of spider

Megamyrmaekion velox is a species of spider in the family Gnaphosidae. It occurs in southern Africa and is commonly known as the Kalahari curly-legged ground spider.

== Distribution ==
Megamyrmaekion velox is recorded from Namibia and South Africa. In South Africa, it has been recorded from the Northern Cape province near Springbok.

== Habitat and ecology ==
The species is a free-living ground dweller.

== Description ==
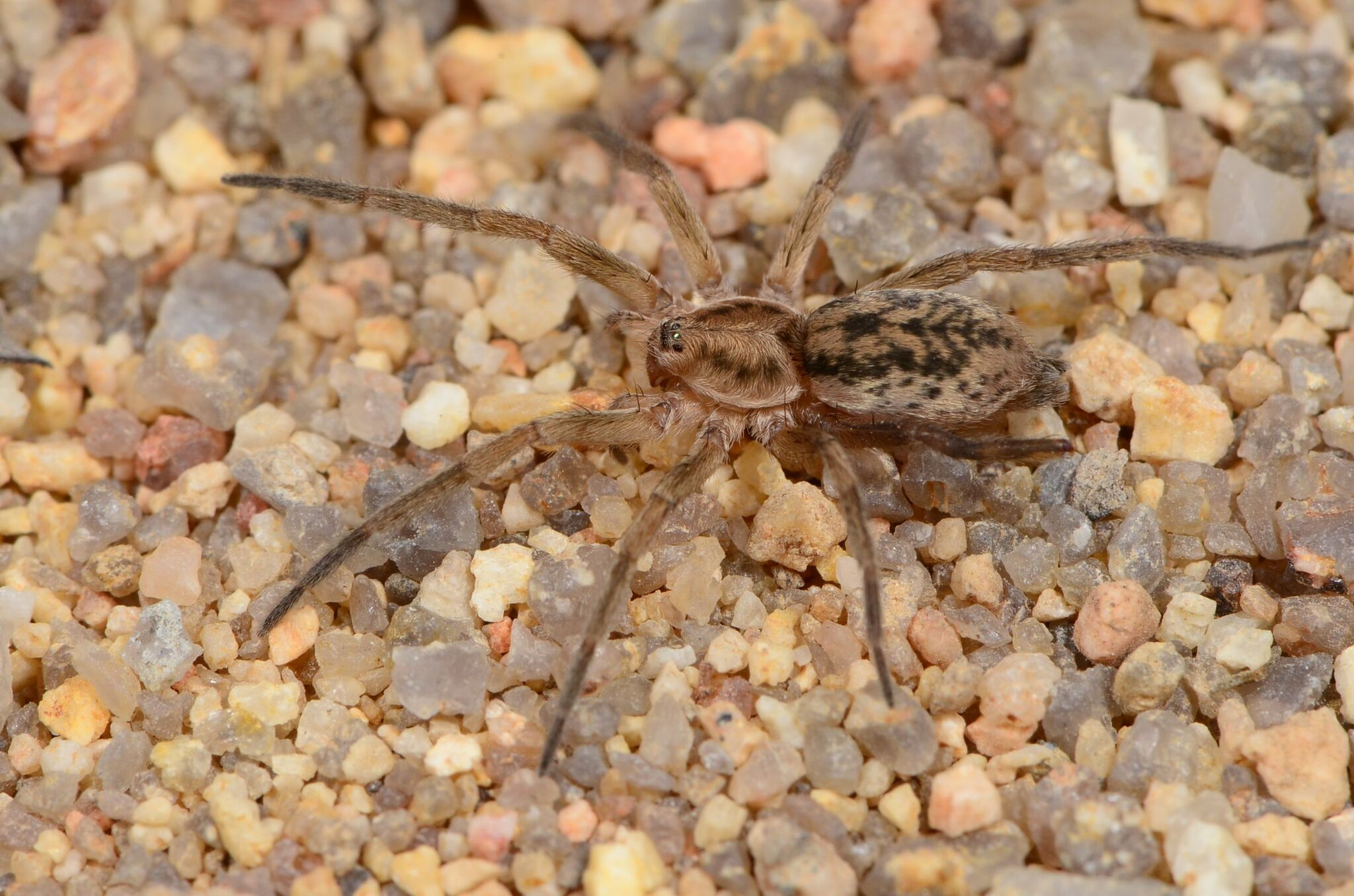
female

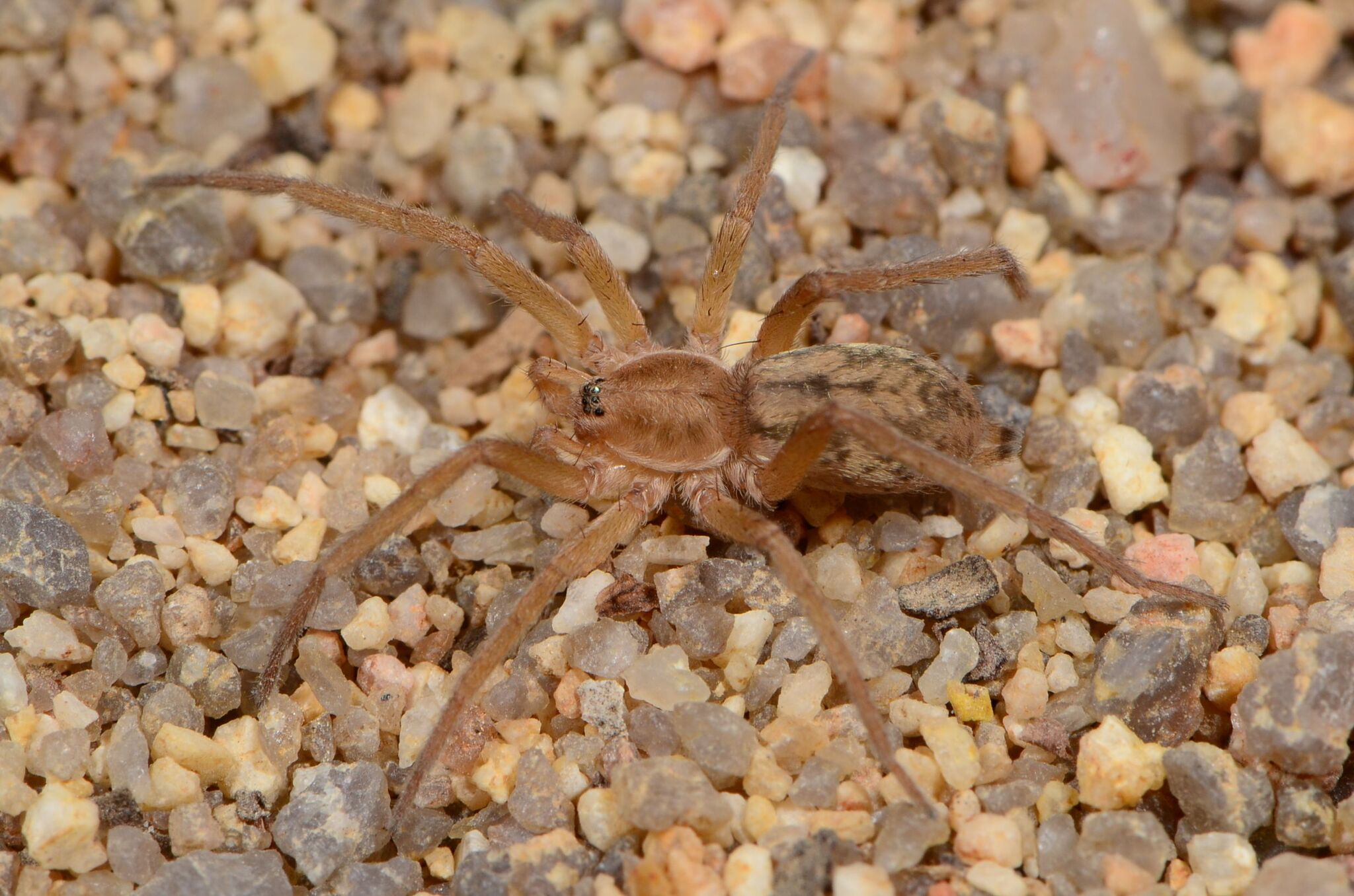
female

== Conservation ==
Megamyrmaekion velox is listed as Data Deficient due to uncertainty about the species' status. The original description by Simon in 1887 did not provide an exact locality, and while the species is listed as occurring in South Africa, the type material was collected by Dr. Hans Schinz who was known to collect in Namibia. More sampling is needed to confirm the species' identity and distribution.

== Etymology ==
The specific name is Latin for "quick, speedy".

== Taxonomy ==
The species was described by Simon in 1887 but without providing an exact type locality. It has not been revised since the original description, and only the female is known.
