= Berinda =

Scientific classification
- Kingdom: Animalia
- Phylum: Arthropoda
- Subphylum: Chelicerata
- Class: Arachnida
- Order: Araneae
- Infraorder: Araneomorphae
- Family: Gnaphosidae
- Genus: Berinda; Roewer, 1928

Type species
- B. amabilis Roewer, 1928

Species
- 10, see text

Genus of spiders

Berinda is a genus of ground spiders that was first described by Carl Friedrich Roewer in 1928. It is very similar to the genus Zagrotes.

== Species ==
As of May 2026 it contains ten species in Mediterranean Europe and the near East:

- Berinda aegilia Chatzaki, 2002 – Greece
- Berinda amabilis Roewer, 1928 (type) – Greece (Crete)
- Berinda anlasi Danışman et al., 2025 – Turkey
- Berinda cooki Logunov, 2012 – Turkey
- Berinda cypria Chatzaki & Panayiotou, 2010 – Cyprus
- Berinda ensigera (O. Pickard-Cambridge, 1874) – Greece (incl. Crete), Turkey
- Berinda hakani Chatzaki & Seyyar, 2010 – Turkey
- Berinda hoerwegi Zamani et al., 2021 – Iran
- Berinda idae Lissner, 2016 – Greece
- Berinda orgeli Danışman et al., 2025 – Turkey
