= Zagrotes =

Scientific classification
- Kingdom: Animalia
- Phylum: Arthropoda
- Subphylum: Chelicerata
- Class: Arachnida
- Order: Araneae
- Infraorder: Araneomorphae
- Family: Gnaphosidae
- Genus: Zagrotes; Zamani, Chatzaki, Esyunin & Marusik, 2021

Type species
- Z. apophysalis Zamani, Chatzaki, Esyunin & Marusik, 2021

Species
- 4, see text

Genus of spiders

Zagrotes is a genus of Iranian ground spiders, first described by Alireza Zamani, Maria Chatzaki, Sergei L. Esyunin and Yuri M. Marusik in 2021.

== Species ==
As of December 2021 it contains four species:

- Z. apophysalis Zamani, Chatzaki, Esyunin & Marusik, 2021 (type)
- Z. bifurcatus (Zamani, Chatzaki, Esyunin & Marusik, 2021)
- Z. borna Zamani & Marusik, 2021
- Z. parla Zamani & Marusik, 2021

== See also ==
- Berinda
