= List of Gnaphosidae species =

This page lists all described genera and species of the spider family Gnaphosidae. As of July 2024, the World Spider Catalog accepts 2474 species in 153 genera:

== A ==
=== Allomicythus ===
Allomicythus Ono, 2009

- Allomicythus kamurai Ono, 2009 (type) — Vietnam

=== Allozelotes ===
Allozelotes Yin & Peng, 1998

- Allozelotes dianshi Yin & Peng, 1998 — China
- Allozelotes lushan Yin & Peng, 1998 (type) — China
- Allozelotes microsaccatus Yang, Zhang, Zhang & Kim, 2009 — China
- Allozelotes songi Yang, Zhang, Zhang & Kim, 2009 — China

=== Almafuerte ===
Almafuerte Grismado & Carrión, 2017

- Almafuerte facon Grismado & Carrión, 2017 — Bolivia
- Almafuerte giaii (Gerschman & Schiapelli, 1948) — Argentina
- Almafuerte goloboffi Grismado & Carrión, 2017 — Argentina
- Almafuerte kuru Grismado & Carrión, 2017 — Argentina
- Almafuerte peripampasica Grismado & Carrión, 2017 (type) — Argentina, Uruguay
- Almafuerte remota Grismado & Carrión, 2017 — Argentina
- Almafuerte vigorosa Grismado & Carrión, 2017 — Argentina

=== Amazoromus ===
Amazoromus Brescovit & Höfer, 1994

- Amazoromus becki Brescovit & Höfer, 1994 — Brazil
- Amazoromus cristus (Platnick & Höfer, 1990) — Brazil
- Amazoromus janauari Brescovit & Höfer, 1994 — Brazil
- Amazoromus kedus Brescovit & Höfer, 1994 (type) — Brazil

=== Amusia ===
Amusia Tullgren, 1910

- Amusia cataracta Tucker, 1923 — South Africa
- Amusia murina Tullgren, 1910 (type) — East Africa

=== Anagraphis ===
Anagraphis Simon, 1893

- Anagraphis incerta Caporiacco, 1941 — Ethiopia
- Anagraphis maculosa Denis, 1958 — Afghanistan
- Anagraphis minima Caporiacco, 1947 — East Africa
- Anagraphis ochracea (L. Koch, 1867) — Albania, Macedonia, Greece, Turkey
- Anagraphis pallens Simon, 1893 (type) — Libya, Malta, Greece, Turkey, Israel, Syria, Russia (Europe), Azerbaijan, Iran, Kazakhstan, Central Asia
- Anagraphis pluridentata Simon, 1897 — Syria
- Anagraphis pori Levy, 1999 — Israel

=== Anagrina ===
Anagrina Berland, 1920

- Anagrina alticola Berland, 1920 (type) — East Africa
- Anagrina nigritibialis Denis, 1955 — Niger

=== Aneplasa ===
Aneplasa Tucker, 1923

- Aneplasa balnearia Tucker, 1923 (type) — South Africa
- Aneplasa borlei Lessert, 1933 — Angola
- Aneplasa facies Tucker, 1923 — South Africa
- Aneplasa interrogationis Tucker, 1923 — South Africa
- Aneplasa nigra Tucker, 1923 — South Africa
- Aneplasa primaris Tucker, 1923 — South Africa
- Aneplasa sculpturata Tucker, 1923 — South Africa
- Aneplasa strandi Caporiacco, 1947 — East Africa

=== Anzacia ===
Anzacia Dalmas, 1919

- Anzacia daviesae Ovtsharenko & Platnick, 1995 — Australia (Queensland)
- Anzacia debilis (Hogg, 1900) — Australia (Victoria)
- Anzacia dimota (Simon, 1908) — Australia (Victoria)
- Anzacia gemmea (Dalmas, 1917) — New Zealand, Australia (Phillip Is.)
- Anzacia inornata (Rainbow, 1920) — Australia (Norfolk Is.)
- Anzacia invenusta (L. Koch, 1872) — Australia (New South Wales)
- Anzacia micacea (Simon, 1908) — Australia (Western Australia)
- Anzacia mustecula (Simon, 1908) — New Guinea, Australia (mainland, Cato Is., Lord Howe Is.)
- Anzacia perelegans (Rainbow, 1894) — Australia (New South Wales)
- Anzacia perexigua (Simon, 1880) (type) — New Caledonia
- Anzacia petila (Simon, 1908) — Australia (Western Australia)
- Anzacia respersa (Simon, 1908) — Australia (Western Australia)
- Anzacia sarrita (Simon, 1908) — Australian Capital Territory, Victoria, Tasmania
- Anzacia signata (Rainbow, 1920) — Australia (Norfolk Is.)
- Anzacia simoni Roewer, 1951 — Australia (Western Australia, Victoria)

=== Aphantaulax ===
Aphantaulax

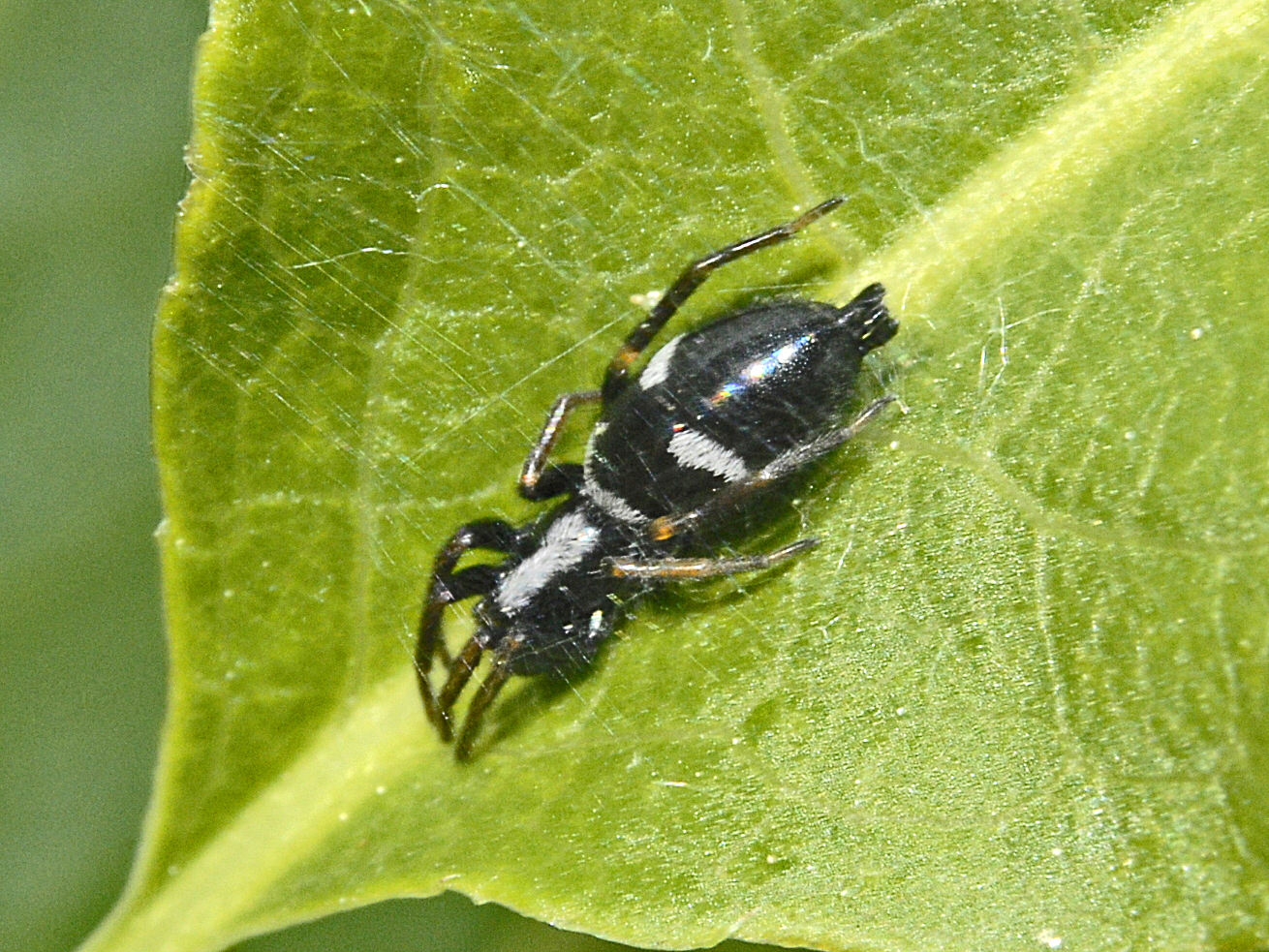
Aphantaulax trifasciata

Aphantaulax Simon, 1878

- Aphantaulax albini (Audouin, 1826) (type) — Egypt, Ethiopia
- Aphantaulax australis Simon, 1893 — South Africa
- Aphantaulax cincta (L. Koch, 1866) — Europe, Turkey, North Africa, Israel
- Aphantaulax ensifera Simon, 1907 — São Tomé and Príncipe
- Aphantaulax fasciata Kulczyński, 1911 — Thailand, Indonesia (Java, Lombok)
- Aphantaulax flavida Caporiacco, 1940 — Ethiopia
- Aphantaulax inornata Tucker, 1923 — South Africa
- Aphantaulax katangae (Giltay, 1935) — Congo
- Aphantaulax rostrata Dankittipakul & Singtripop, 2013 — Thailand
- Aphantaulax scotophaea Simon, 1908 — Australia (Western Australia)
- Aphantaulax signicollis Tucker, 1923 — South Africa
- Aphantaulax stationis Tucker, 1923 — South Africa
- Aphantaulax trifasciata (O. Pickard-Cambridge, 1872) — Southern Europe, North Africa, Turkey, Israel, Caucasus, Russia (Europe) to Central Asia, China, Japan
  - Aphantaulax trifasciata trimaculata Simon, 1878 — France
- Aphantaulax univittata Thorell, 1897 — Myanmar
- Aphantaulax voiensis Berland, 1920 — East Africa
- Aphantaulax zonata Thorell, 1895 — Myanmar

=== Apodrassodes ===
Apodrassodes Vellard, 1924

- Apodrassodes araucanius (Chamberlin, 1916) — Peru, Bolivia, Argentina, Chile
- Apodrassodes chula Brescovit & Lise, 1993 — Brazil
- Apodrassodes guatemalensis (F. O. Pickard-Cambridge, 1899) (type) — Mexico, Central, South America
- Apodrassodes mercedes Platnick & Shadab, 1983 — Chile
- Apodrassodes mono Müller, 1987 — Brazil
- Apodrassodes pucon Platnick & Shadab, 1983 — Chile
- Apodrassodes quilpuensis (Simon, 1902) — Chile
- Apodrassodes taim Brescovit & Lise, 1993 — Brazil
- Apodrassodes trancas Platnick & Shadab, 1983 — Chile, Argentina
- Apodrassodes yogeshi Gajbe, 1993 — India

=== Apodrassus ===
Apodrassus Chamberlin, 1916

- Apodrassus andinus Chamberlin, 1916 (type) — Peru

=== Apopyllus ===
Apopyllus Platnick & Shadab, 1984

- Apopyllus aeolicus Azevedo, Ott, Griswold & Santos, 2016 — Brazil
- Apopyllus atlanticus Azevedo, Ott, Griswold & Santos, 2016 — Brazil
- Apopyllus centralis Azevedo, Ott, Griswold & Santos, 2016 — Brazil
- Apopyllus gandarela Azevedo, Ott, Griswold & Santos, 2016 — Brazil
- Apopyllus huanuco Platnick & Shadab, 1984 — Peru
- Apopyllus ivieorum Platnick & Shadab, 1984 — Mexico
- Apopyllus malleco Platnick & Shadab, 1984 — Chile
- Apopyllus now Platnick & Shadab, 1984 — Curaçao, Colombia
- Apopyllus silvestrii (Simon, 1905) (type) — Peru, Bolivia, Brazil, Argentina, Chile
- Apopyllus suavis (Simon, 1893) — Venezuela, Peru, Brazil, Argentina

=== Aracus ===
Aracus Thorell, 1887

- Aracus captator Thorell, 1887 (type) — Myanmar

=== Arauchemus ===
Arauchemus Ott & Brescovit, 2012

- Arauchemus graudo Ott & Brescovit, 2012 (type) — Brazil
- Arauchemus miudo Ott & Brescovit, 2012 — Brazil

=== Asemesthes ===
Asemesthes Simon, 1887

- Asemesthes affinis Lessert, 1933 — Angola
- Asemesthes albovittatus Purcell, 1908 — Namibia, South Africa
- Asemesthes ales Tucker, 1923 — South Africa
- Asemesthes alternatus Lawrence, 1928 — Namibia
- Asemesthes ceresicola Tucker, 1923 — South Africa
- Asemesthes decoratus Purcell, 1908 — Namibia, South Africa
- Asemesthes flavipes Purcell, 1908 — Namibia
- Asemesthes fodina Tucker, 1923 — South Africa
- Asemesthes hertigi Lessert, 1933 — Angola
- Asemesthes kunenensis Lawrence, 1927 — Namibia
- Asemesthes lamberti Tucker, 1923 — South Africa
- Asemesthes lineatus Purcell, 1908 — Namibia, South Africa
- Asemesthes modestus Dalmas, 1921 — South Africa
- Asemesthes montanus Tucker, 1923 — South Africa
- Asemesthes nigristernus Dalmas, 1921 — South Africa
- Asemesthes numisma Tucker, 1923 — South Africa
- Asemesthes oconnori Tucker, 1923 — South Africa
- Asemesthes pallidus Purcell, 1908 — South Africa
- Asemesthes paynteri Tucker, 1923 — South Africa
- Asemesthes perdignus Dalmas, 1921 — Namibia
- Asemesthes purcelli Tucker, 1923 — South Africa
- Asemesthes reflexus Tucker, 1923 — South Africa
- Asemesthes septentrionalis Caporiacco, 1940 — Ethiopia
- Asemesthes sinister Lawrence, 1927 — Namibia
- Asemesthes subnubilus Simon, 1887 (type) — South Africa
- Asemesthes windhukensis Tucker, 1923 — Namibia

=== Asiabadus ===
Asiabadus Roewer, 1961

- Asiabadus asiaticus (Charitonov, 1946) (type) — Central Asia, Afghanistan

=== Australoechemus ===
Australoechemus Schmidt & Piepho, 1994

- Australoechemus celer Schmidt & Piepho, 1994 — Cape Verde Is.
- Australoechemus oecobiophilus Schmidt & Piepho, 1994 (type) — Cape Verde Is.

=== Austrammo ===
Austrammo Platnick, 2002

- Austrammo barbaramarksae Framenau, 2023 — Australia
- Austrammo harveyi Platnick, 2002 — Australia
- Austrammo hirsti Platnick, 2002 — Australia
- Austrammo monteithi Platnick, 2002 (type) — Australia
- Austrammo rossi Platnick, 2002 — Australia

=== Avstroneulanda ===
Avstroneulanda Zakharov & Ovtsharenko, 2022

- Avstroneulanda grayi Zakharov & Ovtsharenko, 2022 (type) — Australia
- Avstroneulanda harveyi Zakharov & Ovtsharenko, 2022 — Australia
- Avstroneulanda hostosi Zakharov & Ovtsharenko, 2022 — Papua New Guinea
- Avstroneulanda johnmurphyi Zakharov & Ovtsharenko, 2022 — Australia
- Avstroneulanda joyae Zakharov & Ovtsharenko, 2022 — Australia
- Avstroneulanda julianneae Zakharov & Ovtsharenko, 2022 — Australia
- Avstroneulanda kokoda Zakharov & Ovtsharenko, 2022 — Papua New Guinea
- Avstroneulanda lawless Zakharov & Ovtsharenko, 2022 — Australia
- Avstroneulanda mariya Zakharov & Ovtsharenko, 2022 — Australia
- Avstroneulanda raveni Zakharov & Ovtsharenko, 2022 — Australia
- Avstroneulanda robertsi Zakharov & Ovtsharenko, 2022 — Australia
- Avstroneulanda serrata Zakharov & Ovtsharenko, 2022 — Australia
- Avstroneulanda yarraman Zakharov & Ovtsharenko, 2022 — Australia

== B ==
=== Benoitodes ===
Benoitodes Platnick, 1993

- Benoitodes caheni (Benoit, 1977) (type) — St. Helena
- Benoitodes sanctaehelenae (Strand, 1909) — St. Helena

=== Berinda ===
Berinda Roewer, 1928

- Berinda aegilia Chatzaki, 2002 — Greece
- Berinda amabilis Roewer, 1928 (type) — Greece (Crete)
- Berinda cooki Logunov, 2012 — Turkey
- Berinda cypria Chatzaki & Panayiotou, 2010 — Cyprus
- Berinda ensigera (O. Pickard-Cambridge, 1874) — Greece (incl. Crete), Turkey
- Berinda hakani Chatzaki & Seyyar, 2010 — Turkey
- Berinda idae Lissner, 2016 — Greece

=== Berlandina ===
Berlandina

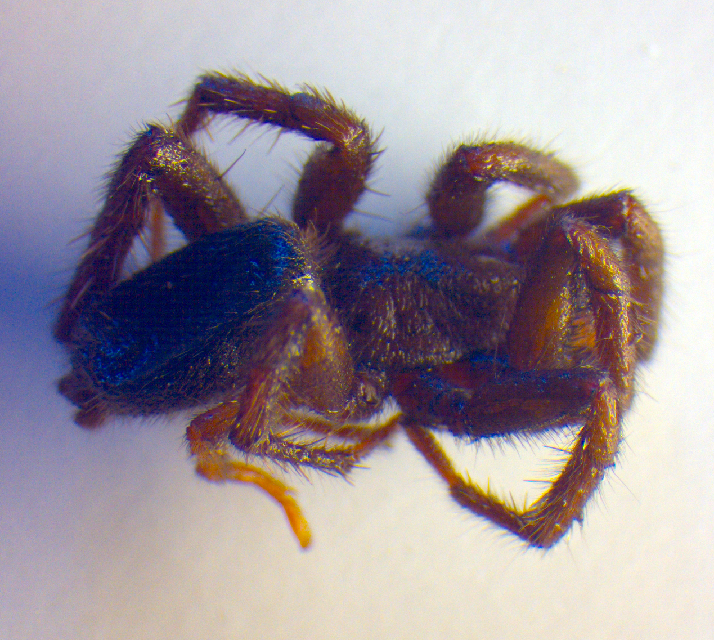
Berlandina cinerea

Berlandina Dalmas, 1922

- Berlandina afghana Denis, 1958 — Iran, Afghanistan, Pakistan
- Berlandina apscheronica Dunin, 1984 — Russia (Europe), Azerbaijan, Kazakhstan
- Berlandina asbenica Denis, 1955 — Niger
- Berlandina avishur Levy, 2009 — Israel
- Berlandina caspica Ponomarev, 1979 — Russia (Europe to Central Asia), Caucasus, Iran, Central Asia, Mongolia
- Berlandina charitonovi Ponomarev, 1979 — Russia (Europe, Caucasus), Azerbaijan, Kazakhstan
- Berlandina cinerea (Menge, 1872) — Europe, Russia (Europe to south Siberia), Iran, Kazakhstan
- Berlandina corcyraea (O. Pickard-Cambridge, 1874) — Albania, Greece (incl. Corfu)
- Berlandina denisi Roewer, 1961 — Afghanistan
- Berlandina deserticola (Dalmas, 1921) — Algeria, Libya
- Berlandina drassodea (Caporiacco, 1934) — Karakorum
- Berlandina hui Song, Zhu & Zhang, 2004 — China
- Berlandina kolosvaryi Caporiacco, 1947 — East Africa
- Berlandina koponeni Marusik, Fomichev & Omelko, 2014 — Mongolia, China
- Berlandina litvinovi Fomichev & Marusik, 2017 — Mongolia
- Berlandina meruana (Dalmas, 1921) — East Africa
- Berlandina mishenini Marusik, Fomichev & Omelko, 2014 — Mongolia
- Berlandina nabozhenkoi Ponomarev & Tsvetkov, 2006 — Russia (Europe)
- Berlandina nakonechnyi Marusik, Fomichev & Omelko, 2014 — Mongolia
- Berlandina nenilini Ponomarev & Tsvetkov, 2006 — Kazakhstan
- Berlandina nigromaculata (Blackwall, 1865) — Cape Verde Is.
- Berlandina nubivaga (Simon, 1878) — Alps (France, Italy, Switzerland), Macedonia, Bulgaria
- Berlandina obscurata Caporiacco, 1947 — East Africa
- Berlandina ovtsharenkoi Marusik, Fomichev & Omelko, 2014 — Mongolia
- Berlandina piephoi Schmidt, 1994 — Cape Verde Is.
- Berlandina plumalis (O. Pickard-Cambridge, 1872) (type) — West Africa, Mediterranean to Central Asia, Iran
- Berlandina potanini Schenkel, 1963 — Russia (south Siberia), Mongolia, China
- Berlandina propinqua Roewer, 1961 — Afghanistan
- Berlandina pulchra (Nosek, 1905) — Turkey
- Berlandina punica (Dalmas, 1921) — Algeria, Tunisia, Libya
- Berlandina saraevi Ponomarev, 2008 — Kazakhstan
- Berlandina schenkeli Marusik & Logunov, 1995 — Russia (south Siberia)
- Berlandina shnitnikovi (Spassky, 1934) — Kazakhstan
- Berlandina shumskyi Kovblyuk, 2003 — Ukraine
- Berlandina spasskyi Ponomarev, 1979 — Russia (Europe), Kazakhstan, Mongolia, China
- Berlandina ubsunurica Marusik & Logunov, 1995 — Russia (south Siberia), Mongolia
- Berlandina venatrix (O. Pickard-Cambridge, 1874) — Libya, Egypt
- Berlandina yakovlevi Marusik, Fomichev & Omelko, 2014 — Mongolia

== C ==
=== Cabanadrassus ===
Cabanadrassus Mello-Leitão, 1941

- Cabanadrassus bifasciatus Mello-Leitão, 1941 (type) — Argentina

=== Callilepis ===
Callilepis

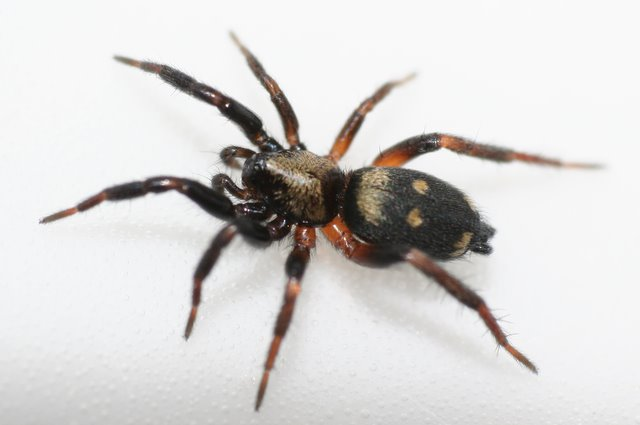
Callilepis nocturna

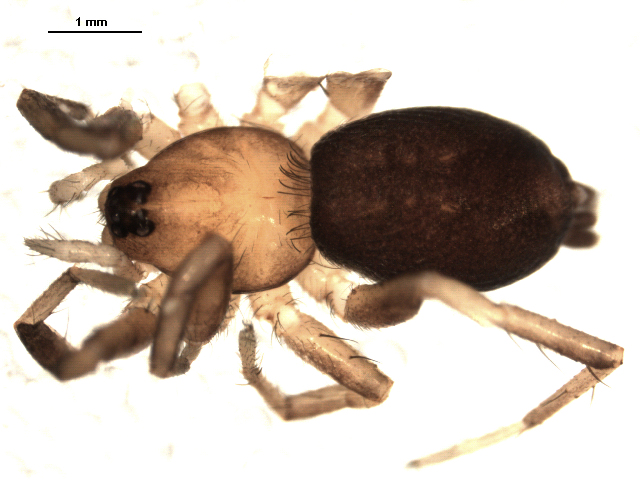
Callilepis pluto

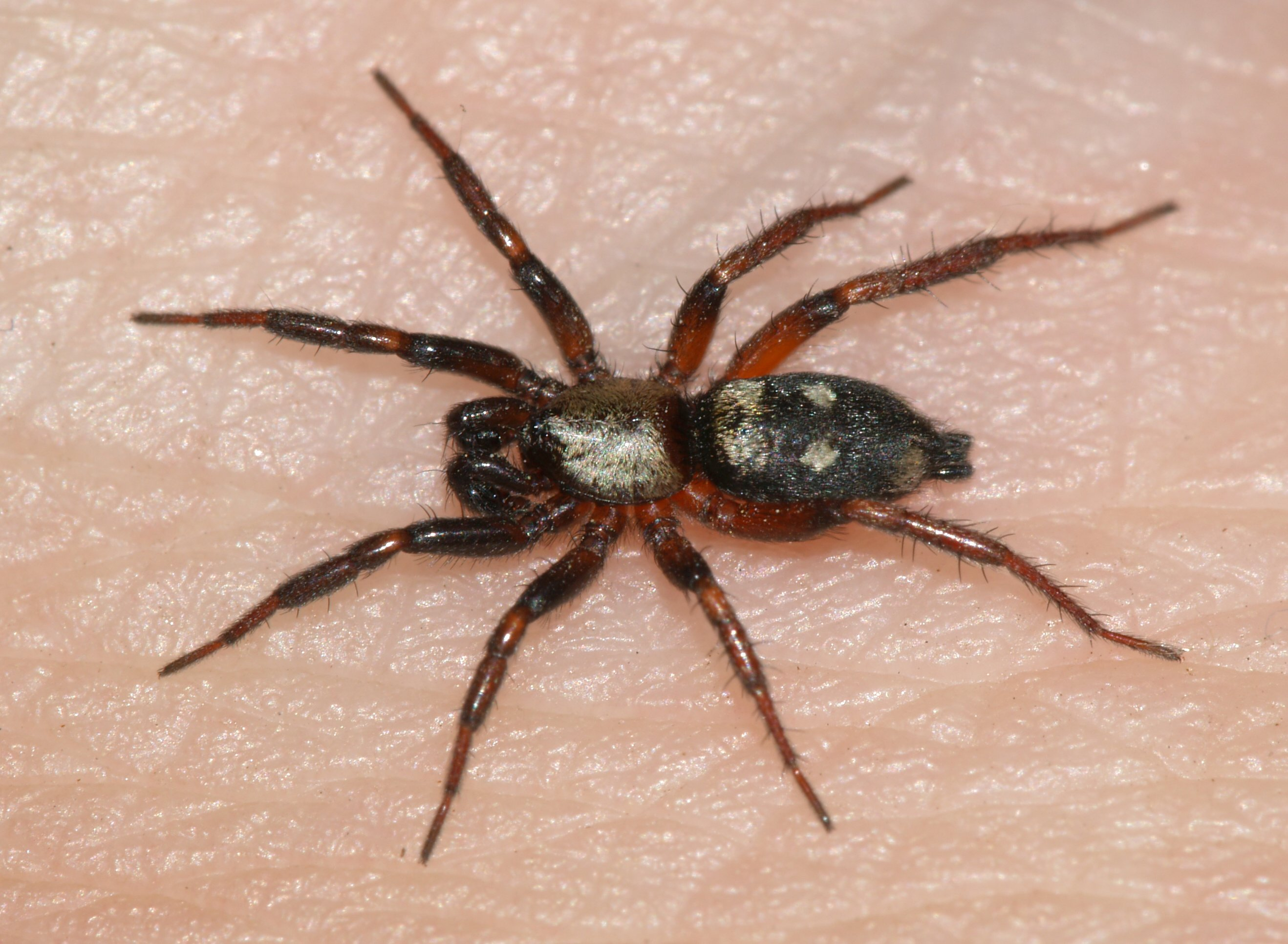
Callilepis schuszteri, male

Callilepis Westring, 1874

- Callilepis chakanensis Tikader, 1982 — India
- Callilepis chisos Platnick, 1975 — USA
- Callilepis concolor Simon, 1914 — Southern Europe
- Callilepis cretica (Roewer, 1928) — Macedonia, Greece, Turkey, Azerbaijan
- Callilepis eremella Chamberlin, 1928 — North America
- Callilepis gertschi Platnick, 1975 — USA, Mexico
- Callilepis gosoga Chamberlin & Gertsch, 1940 — USA
- Callilepis imbecilla (Keyserling, 1887) — USA, Canada
- Callilepis ketani Gajbe, 1984 — India
- Callilepis lambai Tikader & Gajbe, 1977 — India
- Callilepis mumai Platnick, 1975 — USA, Mexico
- Callilepis nocturna (Linnaeus, 1758) (type) — Europe, Caucasus, Russia (Europe to Far East), Kazakhstan, China, Japan
- Callilepis pawani Gajbe, 1984 — India
- Callilepis pluto Banks, 1896 — USA, Canada
- Callilepis rajani Gajbe, 1984 — India
- Callilepis rajasthanica Tikader & Gajbe, 1977 — India
- Callilepis rukminiae Tikader & Gajbe, 1977 — India
- Callilepis schuszteri (Herman, 1879) — Europe, Caucasus, Russia (Europe to Far East), China, Korea, Japan

=== Callipelis ===
Callipelis Zamani & Marusik, 2017

- Callipelis deserticola Zamani & Marusik, 2017 — Iran

=== Camillina ===
Camillina Berland, 1919

- Camillina aldabrae (Strand, 1907) — Africa, Seychelles. Introduced to Malaysia (Borneo)
- Camillina antigua Platnick & Shadab, 1982 — Guatemala, Honduras
- Camillina arequipa Platnick & Shadab, 1982 — Peru
- Camillina balboa Platnick & Shadab, 1982 — Panama, Colombia
- Camillina bimini Platnick & Shadab, 1982 — Bahama Is.
- Camillina biplagia Tucker, 1923 — South Africa
- Camillina brasiliensis Müller, 1987 — Brazil
- Camillina caldas Platnick & Shadab, 1982 — Brazil
- Camillina calel Platnick & Shadab, 1982 — Argentina
- Camillina campeche Platnick & Shadab, 1982 — Mexico
- Camillina capensis Platnick & Murphy, 1987 — South Africa
- Camillina cauca Platnick & Shadab, 1982 — Colombia
- Camillina cayman Platnick & Shadab, 1982 — Cayman Is.
- Camillina chiapa Platnick & Shadab, 1982 — Mexico
- Camillina chilensis (Simon, 1902) — Brazil to Chile, Juan Fernandez Is.
- Camillina chincha Platnick & Shadab, 1982 — Peru
- Camillina claro Platnick & Shadab, 1982 — Brazil
- Camillina colon Platnick & Shadab, 1982 — Panama
- Camillina cordifera (Tullgren, 1910) (type) — Central, Southern Africa, Seychelles
- Camillina cordoba Platnick & Murphy, 1987 — Argentina
- Camillina cruz Platnick & Shadab, 1982 — Ecuador (Galapagos Is.)
- Camillina cui Platnick & Murphy, 1987 — Paraguay
- Camillina desecheonis (Petrunkevitch, 1930) — Puerto Rico
- Camillina elegans (Bryant, 1940) — Caribbean. Introduced to Angola, Pacific islands
- Camillina europaea Dalmas, 1922 — Italy
- Camillina fiana Platnick & Murphy, 1987 — Madagascar, Comoros
- Camillina gaira Platnick & Shadab, 1982 — Colombia, Caribbean
- Camillina galapagoensis (Banks, 1902) — Ecuador (Galapagos Is.)
- Camillina galianoae Platnick & Murphy, 1987 — Argentina
- Camillina huanta Platnick & Shadab, 1982 — Peru
- Camillina isabela Platnick & Murphy, 1987 — Ecuador (Galapagos Is.)
- Camillina isla Platnick & Shadab, 1982 — Ecuador (Galapagos Is.)
- Camillina javieri Alayón, 2004 — Cuba
- Camillina jeris Platnick & Shadab, 1982 — Curaçao
- Camillina kaibos Platnick & Murphy, 1987 — Ivory Coast to Kenya
- Camillina kochalkai Platnick & Murphy, 1987 — Paraguay
- Camillina longipes (Nicolet, 1849) — Chile
- Camillina madrejon Platnick & Murphy, 1987 — Paraguay
- Camillina mahnerti Platnick & Murphy, 1987 — Paraguay
- Camillina major (Keyserling, 1891) — Brazil, Argentina
- Camillina marmorata (Mello-Leitão, 1943) — Argentina, Bolivia
- Camillina maun Platnick & Murphy, 1987 — Southern Africa
- Camillina mauryi Platnick & Murphy, 1987 — Argentina
- Camillina merida Platnick & Shadab, 1982 — Venezuela
- Camillina minuta (Mello-Leitão, 1941) — Argentina
- Camillina mogollon Platnick & Shadab, 1982 — Peru
- Camillina mona Platnick & Shadab, 1982 — Jamaica
- Camillina namibensis Platnick & Murphy, 1987 — Namibia
- Camillina nevada Platnick & Shadab, 1982 — Colombia
- Camillina nevis Platnick & Shadab, 1982 — Caribbean
- Camillina nova Platnick & Shadab, 1982 — Brazil, Paraguay, Argentina
- Camillina oruro Platnick & Shadab, 1982 — Bolivia, Peru, Argentina
- Camillina pavesii (Simon, 1897) — Africa
- Camillina pecki Baert, 1994 — Ecuador (Galapagos Is.)
- Camillina pedestris (O. Pickard-Cambridge, 1898) — Mexico
- Camillina penai Platnick & Murphy, 1987 — Chile, Peru
- Camillina pernambuco Müller, 1987 — Brazil
- Camillina pilar Platnick & Murphy, 1987 — Paraguay, Argentina
- Camillina piura Platnick & Shadab, 1982 — Peru
- Camillina procurva (Purcell, 1908) — South Africa
- Camillina puebla Platnick & Shadab, 1982 — Mexico, Honduras
- Camillina pulchra (Keyserling, 1891) — Brazil, Argentina. Introduced to USA
- Camillina punta Platnick & Shadab, 1982 — Peru
- Camillina recife Müller, 1987 — Brazil
- Camillina relucens (Simon, 1893) — Venezuela
- Camillina rogeri Alayón, 1993 — Cuba
- Camillina samariensis Müller, 1988 — Colombia
- Camillina sandrae Baert, 1994 — Ecuador (Galapagos Is.)
- Camillina setosa Tucker, 1923 — South Africa
- Camillina shaba FitzPatrick, 2005 — Congo
- Camillina smythiesi (Simon, 1897) — India
- Camillina tarapaca Platnick & Shadab, 1982 — Chile
- Camillina taruma Platnick & Höfer, 1990 — Brazil
- Camillina tsima Platnick & Murphy, 1987 — Madagascar
- Camillina ventana Ferreira, Zambonato & Lise, 2004 — Argentina

=== Canariognapha ===
Canariognapha Wunderlich, 2011

- Canariognapha parwis Wunderlich, 2011 (type) — Canary Is.

=== Ceryerda ===
Ceryerda Simon, 1909

- Ceryerda cursitans Simon, 1909 (type) — Australia (Western Australia)

=== Cesonia ===
Cesonia

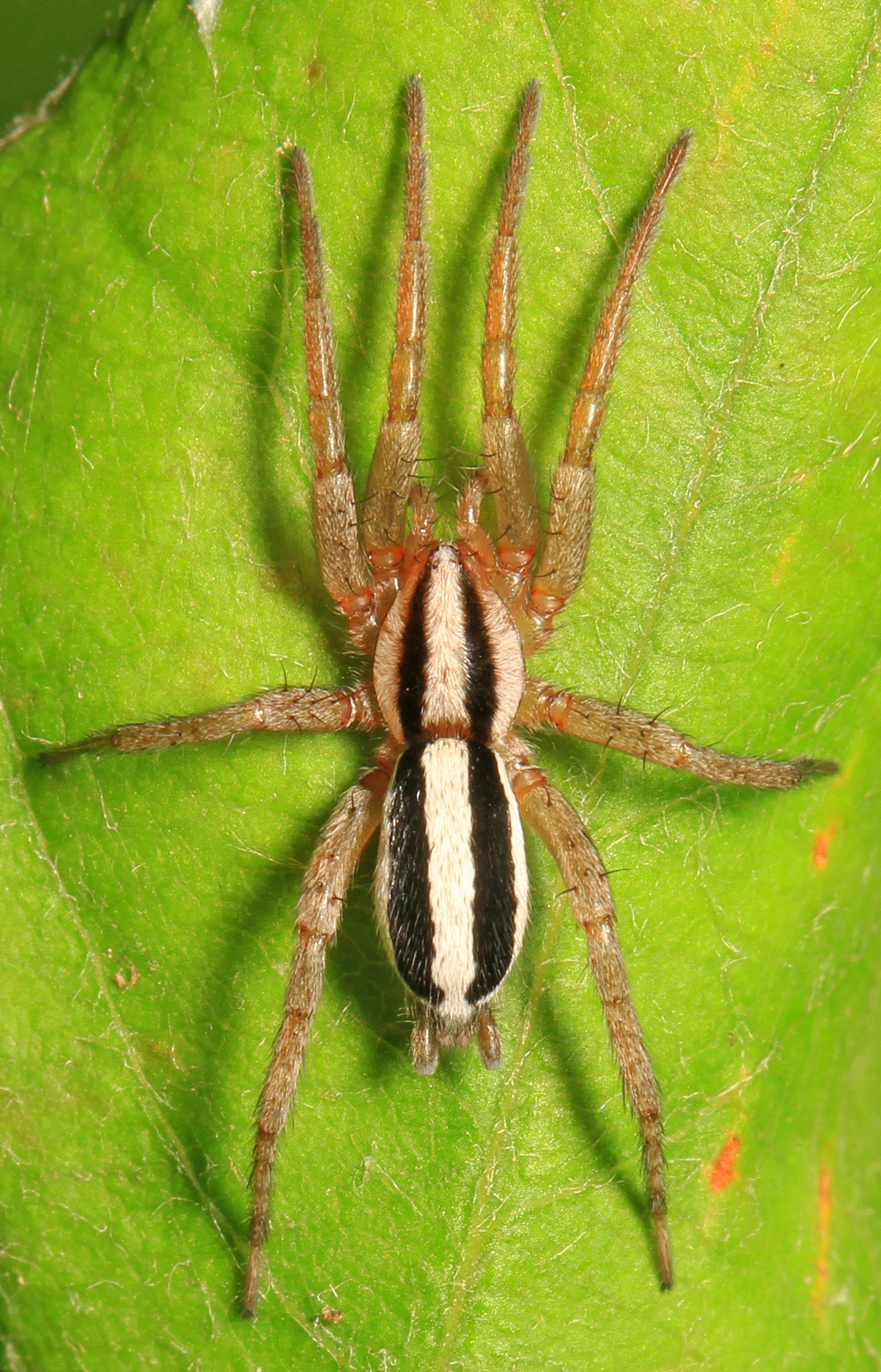
Cesonia bilineata

Cesonia Simon, 1893

- Cesonia aspida Chatzaki, 2002 — Greece (Crete), Turkey
- Cesonia bilineata (Hentz, 1847) (type) — North America
- Cesonia bixleri Platnick & Shadab, 1980 — USA
- Cesonia boca Platnick & Shadab, 1980 — Panama
- Cesonia bryantae Platnick & Shadab, 1980 — Jamaica
- Cesonia cana Platnick & Shadab, 1980 — Jamaica
- Cesonia cerralvo Platnick & Shadab, 1980 — Mexico
- Cesonia chickeringi Platnick & Shadab, 1980 — Jamaica
- Cesonia cincta (Banks, 1909) — Cuba
- Cesonia classica Chamberlin, 1924 — USA, Mexico
- Cesonia coala Platnick & Shadab, 1980 — Mexico
- Cesonia cuernavaca Platnick & Shadab, 1980 — Mexico
- Cesonia desecheo Platnick & Shadab, 1980 — Puerto Rico, Virgin Is.
- Cesonia ditta Platnick & Shadab, 1980 — Dominican Rep.
- Cesonia elegans (Simon, 1892) — St. Vincent, Dominica
- Cesonia gertschi Platnick & Shadab, 1980 — USA, Mexico
- Cesonia grisea (Banks, 1914) — Cuba
- Cesonia irvingi (Mello-Leitão, 1944) — USA, Bahama Is., Cuba
- Cesonia iviei Platnick & Shadab, 1980 — Mexico
- Cesonia josephus (Chamberlin & Gertsch, 1940) — USA
- Cesonia lacertosa Chickering, 1949 — Panama
- Cesonia leechi Platnick & Shadab, 1980 — Mexico
- Cesonia lugubris (O. Pickard-Cambridge, 1896) — Mexico, Honduras
- Cesonia maculata Platnick & Shadab, 1980 — St. Kitts and Nevis
- Cesonia nadleri Platnick & Shadab, 1980 — Hispaniola
- Cesonia notata Chickering, 1949 — Mexico, Panama
- Cesonia pudica Chickering, 1949 — Panama
- Cesonia rothi Platnick & Shadab, 1980 — USA
- Cesonia sincera Gertsch & Mulaik, 1936 — USA, Mexico
- Cesonia trivittata Banks, 1898 — USA, Mexico
- Cesonia ubicki Platnick & Shadab, 1980 — USA, Mexico

=== Chatzakia ===
Chatzakia Lissner & Bosmans, 2016

- Chatzakia balearica Lissner, 2016 — Spain (Balearic Is.)

=== Civizelotes ===
Civizelotes Senglet, 2012

- Civizelotes aituar Esyunin & Tuneva, 2020 — Russia
- Civizelotes aituar Esyunin & Tuneva, 2020 — Russia
- Civizelotes aituar Esyunin & Tuneva, 2020 — Russia
- Civizelotes aituar Esyunin & Tuneva, 2020 — Russia
- Civizelotes aituar Esyunin & Tuneva, 2020 — Russia
- Civizelotes aituar Esyunin & Tuneva, 2020 — Russia
- Civizelotes aituar Esyunin & Tuneva, 2020 — Russia
- Civizelotes aituar Esyunin & Tuneva, 2020 — Russia
- Civizelotes aituar Esyunin & Tuneva, 2020 — Russia
- Civizelotes aituar Esyunin & Tuneva, 2020 — Russia
- Civizelotes aituar Esyunin & Tuneva, 2020 — Russia
- Civizelotes aituar Esyunin & Tuneva, 2020 — Russia
- Civizelotes aituar Esyunin & Tuneva, 2020 — Russia

=== Chileomma ===
Chileomma Platnick, Shadab & Sorkin, 2005

- Chileomma campana Platnick, Shadab & Sorkin, 2005 — Chile
- Chileomma chilensis Platnick, Shadab & Sorkin, 2005 — Chile
- Chileomma franckei Platnick, Shadab & Sorkin, 2005 — Chile
- Chileomma malleco Platnick, Shadab & Sorkin, 2005 — Chile
- Chileomma petorca Platnick, Shadab & Sorkin, 2005 — Chile
- Chileomma rinconada Platnick, Shadab & Sorkin, 2005 — Chile
- Chileomma ruiles Platnick, Shadab & Sorkin, 2005 (type) — Chile

=== Chileuma ===
Chileuma Platnick, Shadab & Sorkin, 2005

- Chileuma paposo Platnick, Shadab & Sorkin, 2005 (type) — Chile
- Chileuma renca Platnick, Shadab & Sorkin, 2005 — Chile
- Chileuma serena Platnick, Shadab & Sorkin, 2005 — Chile

=== Chilongius ===
Chilongius Platnick, Shadab & Sorkin, 2005

- Chilongius eltofo Platnick, Shadab & Sorkin, 2005 — Chile
- Chilongius frayjorge Platnick, Shadab & Sorkin, 2005 — Chile
- Chilongius huasco Platnick, Shadab & Sorkin, 2005 — Chile
- Chilongius molles Platnick, Shadab & Sorkin, 2005 — Chile
- Chilongius palmas Platnick, Shadab & Sorkin, 2005 (type) — Chile

=== Civizelotes ===
Civizelotes Senglet, 2012

- Civizelotes aitaur Esyunin & Tuneva, 2020 — Russia
- Civizelotes akmon Chatzaki, 2021 — Greece
- Civizelotes caucasius (L. Koch, 1866) — Europe to Central Asia, China
- Civizelotes civicus (Simon, 1878) (type) — Europe, Madeira, Morocco
- Civizelotes dentatidens (Simon, 1914) — Spain, France, Italy (Sardinia)
- Civizelotes gracilis (Canestrini, 1868) — Central and South-Eastern Europe, Caucasus (Russia, Georgia), Turkey
- Civizelotes ibericus Senglet, 2012 — Spain, France
- Civizelotes medianoides Senglet, 2012 — Spain
- Civizelotes medianus (Denis, 1936) — Spain, Andorra, France
- Civizelotes pygmaeus (Miller, 1943) — Europe to Kazakhstan
- Civizelotes sengleti (Wunderlich, 2022) — Spain (Balearic Is.)
- Civizelotes solstitialis (Levy, 1998) — Bulgaria, Greece, Crete, Turkey, Israel, Iran
- Civizelotes tibichaetoforus Tuneva & Kuzmin, 2016 — Russia (Europe)

=== Cladothela ===
Cladothela

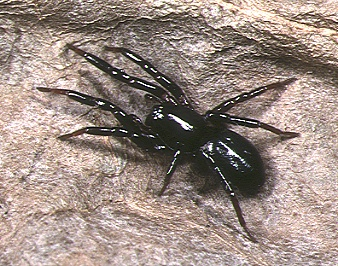
Cladothela auster

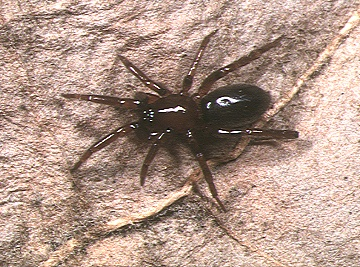
Cladothela parva, female

Cladothela Kishida, 1928

- Cladothela auster Kamura, 1997 — Japan
- Cladothela bicolor Suzuki, 2022 — Japan (Ryukyu Is.)
- Cladothela bistorta Zhang, Song & Zhu, 2002 — China
- Cladothela boninensis Kishida, 1928 (type) — Japan
- Cladothela hupingensis Yin, 2012 — China
- Cladothela joannisi (Schenkel, 1963) — China
- Cladothela ningmingensis Zhang, Yin & Bao, 2004 — China
- Cladothela oculinotata (Bösenberg & Strand, 1906) — China, Korea, Japan
- Cladothela parva Kamura, 1991 — China, Korea, Japan
- Cladothela tortiembola Paik, 1992 — Korea
- Cladothela unciinsignita (Bösenberg & Strand, 1906) — Korea, Japan
- Cladothela unmunensis Seo, 2017 — Korea

=== Coillina ===
Coillina Yin & Peng, 1998

- Coillina baka Yin & Peng, 1998 (type) — China

=== Coreodrassus ===
Coreodrassus Paik, 1984

- Coreodrassus forficalus Zhang & Zhu, 2008 — China
- Coreodrassus infletus (O. Pickard-Cambridge, 1885) — China
- Coreodrassus interlisus (O. Pickard-Cambridge, 1885) — Kazakhstan, India, China
- Coreodrassus lancearius (Simon, 1893) (type) — Kazakhstan, China, Korea, Japan
- Coreodrassus murphyi Liu & Zhang, 2023 — Mongolia, China
- Coreodrassus recepsahini Coşar, Danışman & Marusik, 2024 — Turkey
- Coreodrassus semidesertus Ponomarev & Tsvetkov, 2006 — Kazakhstan

=== Cryptodrassus ===
Cryptodrassus Miller, 1943

- Cryptodrassus beijing Lin & Li, 2022 — China
- Cryptodrassus creticus Chatzaki, 2002 — Greece (Crete), Turkey
- Cryptodrassus helvoloides (Levy, 1998) — Israel
- Cryptodrassus helvolus (O. Pickard-Cambridge, 1872) — Cyprus, Israel, Russia (Europe)
- Cryptodrassus hungaricus (Balogh, 1935) (type) — France to Greece and Russia (Europe)
- Cryptodrassus iranicus Zamani, Chatzaki, Esyunin & Marusik, 2021 — Iran
- Cryptodrassus khajurai (Tikader & Gajbe, 1976) — India
- Cryptodrassus liyanicus Zamani & Marusik, 2024 — Iran
- Cryptodrassus mahabalei (Tikader, 1982) — India
- Cryptodrassus platnicki (Gajbe, 1987) — India
- Cryptodrassus ratnagiriensis (Tikader & Gajbe, 1976) — India

=== Cryptoerithus ===
Cryptoerithus Rainbow, 1915

- Cryptoerithus annaburroo Platnick & Baehr, 2006 — Australia (Northern Territory)
- Cryptoerithus griffith Platnick & Baehr, 2006 — Australia (Queensland, South Australia)
- Cryptoerithus halifax Platnick & Baehr, 2006 — Australia (South Australia)
- Cryptoerithus halli Platnick & Baehr, 2006 — Australia (Western Australia)
- Cryptoerithus harveyi Platnick & Baehr, 2006 — Australia (Western Australia)
- Cryptoerithus hasenpuschi Platnick & Baehr, 2006 — Australia (Queensland)
- Cryptoerithus lawlessi Platnick & Baehr, 2006 — Australia (Queensland)
- Cryptoerithus melindae Platnick & Baehr, 2006 — Australia (Western Australia)
- Cryptoerithus nichtaut Platnick & Baehr, 2006 — Australia (Queensland)
- Cryptoerithus ninan Platnick & Baehr, 2006 — Australia (Western Australia)
- Cryptoerithus nonaut Platnick & Baehr, 2006 — Australia (Northern Territory, South Australia)
- Cryptoerithus nopaut Platnick & Baehr, 2006 — Australia (Western Australia)
- Cryptoerithus nyetaut Platnick & Baehr, 2006 — Australia (Northern Territory)
- Cryptoerithus occultus Rainbow, 1915 (type) — Australia (Western Australia, Northern Territory, South Australia)
- Cryptoerithus quamby Platnick & Baehr, 2006 — Australia (Queensland)
- Cryptoerithus quobba Platnick & Baehr, 2006 — Southern Australia
- Cryptoerithus rough Platnick & Baehr, 2006 — Australia (South Australia)
- Cryptoerithus shadabi Platnick & Baehr, 2006 — Southern Australia
- Cryptoerithus stuart Platnick & Baehr, 2006 — Australia (Northern Territory)

=== Cubanopyllus ===
Cubanopyllus Alayón & Platnick, 1993

- Cubanopyllus inconspicuus (Bryant, 1940) (type) — Cuba

== D ==
=== Dai ===
Dai Liu & Zhang, 2024

- Dai jijiao Liu & Zhang, 2024 — China
- Dai jinchii Liu & Zhang, 2024 (type) — China

=== Diaphractus ===
Diaphractus Purcell, 1907

- Diaphractus assimilis Tullgren, 1910 — East Africa
- Diaphractus leipoldti Purcell, 1907 (type) — South Africa
- Diaphractus muticus Lawrence, 1927 — Namibia

=== Drassodes ===
Drassodes

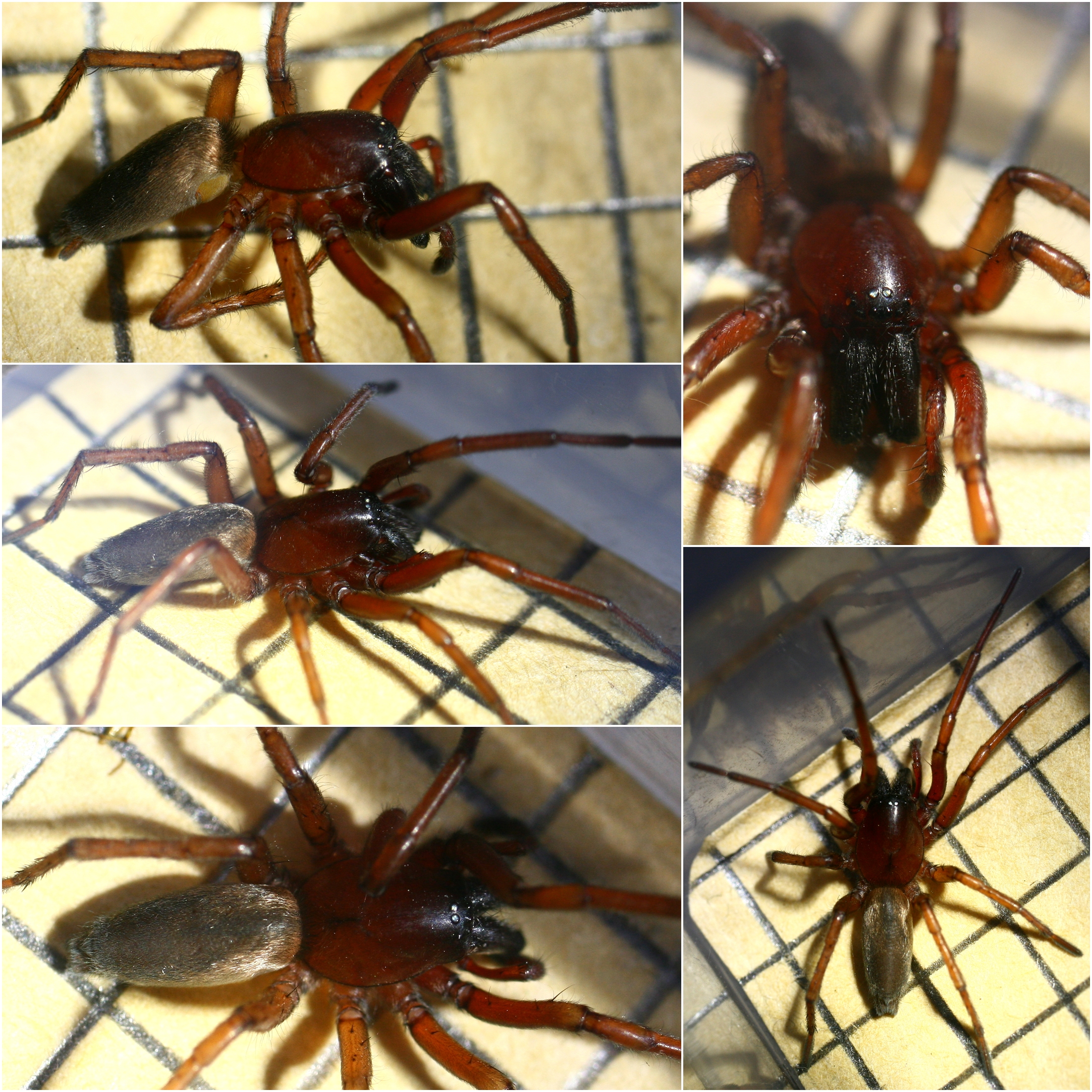
Drassodes cupreus, male

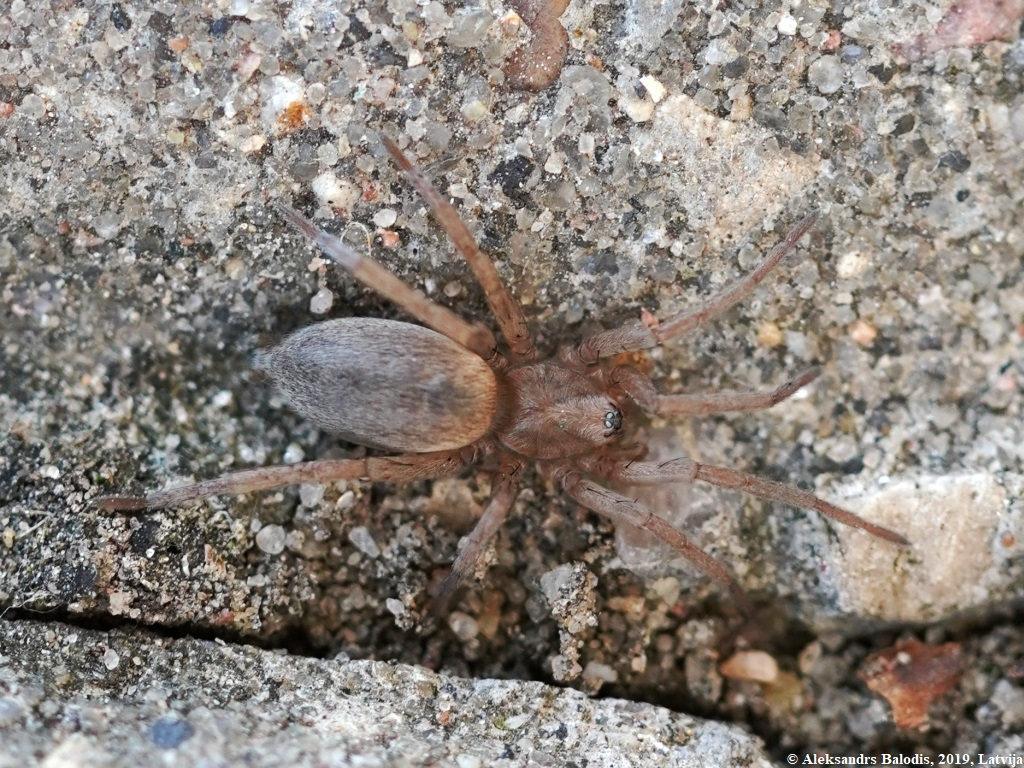
Drassodes lapidosus

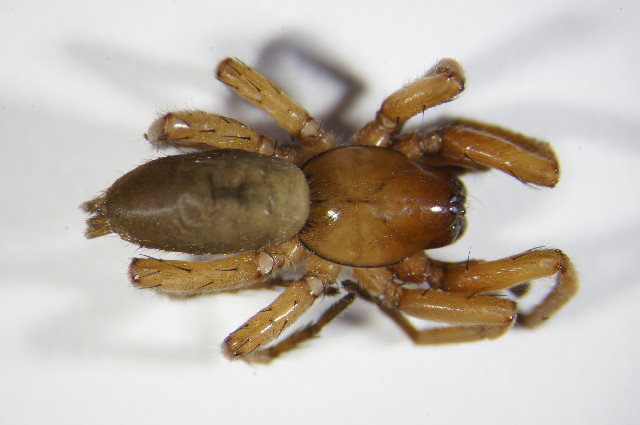
Drassodes pubescens

Drassodes Westring, 1851

- Drassodes adisensis Strand, 1906 — Ethiopia
- Drassodes affinis (Nicolet, 1849) — Chile
- Drassodes afghanus Roewer, 1961 — Afghanistan
- Drassodes albicans (Simon, 1878) — Mediterranean
- Drassodes andamanensis Tikader, 1977 — India (Andaman Is.)
- Drassodes andorranus Denis, 1938 — Andorra
- Drassodes angulus Platnick & Shadab, 1976 — USA
- Drassodes arapensis Strand, 1908 — Peru
- Drassodes archibensis Ponomarev & Alieva, 2008 — Russia (Caucasus)
- Drassodes arenosus Wunderlich, 2023 — Portugal
- Drassodes assimilatus (Blackwall, 1865) — Canary Is., Cape Verde Is.
- Drassodes astrologus (O. Pickard-Cambridge, 1874) — India
- Drassodes auriculoides Barrows, 1919 — USA
- Drassodes auritus Schenkel, 1963 — Russia (Europe), Kazakhstan, China
- Drassodes bechuanicus Tucker, 1923 — South Africa
- Drassodes bendamiranus Roewer, 1961 — Afghanistan
- Drassodes bicurvatus Roewer, 1961 — Afghanistan
- Drassodes bifidus Kovblyuk & Seyyar, 2009 — Turkey
- Drassodes brachythelis (Thorell, 1890) — Indonesia (Sumatra)
- Drassodes braendegaardi Caporiacco, 1949 — Kenya
- Drassodes caffrerianus Purcell, 1907 — South Africa
- Drassodes calceatus Purcell, 1907 — South Africa
- Drassodes cambridgei Roewer, 1951 — India
- Drassodes canaglensis Caporiacco, 1927 — Italy
- Drassodes carinivulvus Caporiacco, 1934 — India
- Drassodes caspius Ponomarev & Tsvetkov, 2006 — Turkey, Russia (Europe, Caucasus), Kazakhstan
- Drassodes cerinus Simon, 1897 — India
- Drassodes charcoviae (Thorell, 1875) — Ukraine
- Drassodes charitonovi Tuneva, 2004 — Kazakhstan
- Drassodes chybyndensis Esyunin & Tuneva, 2002 — Russia (Europe to Central Asia), Kazakhstan, Iran
- Drassodes clavifemur (Reimoser, 1935) — India (Karakorum, Kashmir)
- Drassodes crassipalpus (Roewer, 1961) — Afghanistan
- Drassodes cupa Tuneva, 2004 — Kazakhstan
- Drassodes cupreus (Blackwall, 1834) — Europe, Caucasus, Kazakhstan, Russia (Europe to Far East)
- Drassodes dagestanus Ponomarev & Alieva, 2008 — Russia (Caucasus)
- Drassodes daliensis Yang & Song, 2003 — China
- Drassodes delicatus (Blackwall, 1867) — India
- Drassodes deoprayagensis Tikader & Gajbe, 1975 — India
- Drassodes depilosus Dönitz & Strand, 1906 — Japan
- Drassodes deserticola Simon, 1893 — Algeria, Libya
- Drassodes difficilis (Simon, 1878) — Spain, France, Italy, Turkey?
- Drassodes dispulsoides Schenkel, 1963 — China
- Drassodes distinctus (Lucas, 1846) — Algeria
- Drassodes dregei Purcell, 1907 — South Africa
- Drassodes drydeni Petrunkevitch, 1914 — Myanmar
- Drassodes ellenae (Barrion & Litsinger, 1995) — Philippines
- Drassodes ereptor Purcell, 1907 — South Africa
- Drassodes falciger Jézéquel, 1965 — Ivory Coast
- Drassodes fedtschenkoi (Kroneberg, 1875) — Uzbekistan
- Drassodes fugax (Simon, 1878) — Portugal, Spain, France, Italy, Central Asia, China
- Drassodes gangeticus Tikader & Gajbe, 1975 — India
- Drassodes gia Melic & Barrientos, 2017 — Spain
- Drassodes gilvus Tullgren, 1910 — Tanzania
- Drassodes gooldi Purcell, 1907 — South Africa
- Drassodes gosiutus Chamberlin, 1919 — USA, Canada
- Drassodes gujaratensis Patel & Patel, 1975 — India
- Drassodes hamiger (Thorell, 1877) — Indonesia (Sulawesi)
- Drassodes hebei Song, Zhu & Zhang, 2004 — China
- Drassodes helenae Purcell, 1907 — South Africa
- Drassodes heterophthalmus Simon, 1905 — India
- Drassodes himalayensis Tikader & Gajbe, 1975 — India
- Drassodes ignobilis Petrunkevitch, 1914 — Myanmar
- Drassodes imbecillus (L. Koch, 1875) — Ethiopia
- Drassodes inermis (Simon, 1878) — Spain (Menorca), France
- Drassodes infletus (O. Pickard-Cambridge, 1885) — China (Yarkand), Russia (south Siberia), Mongolia
- Drassodes insidiator Thorell, 1897 — Myanmar
- Drassodes insignis (Blackwall, 1862) — Brazil
- Drassodes interemptor (O. Pickard-Cambridge, 1885) — China (Yarkand)
- Drassodes interlisus (O. Pickard-Cambridge, 1885) — China (Yarkand)
- Drassodes interpolator (O. Pickard-Cambridge, 1885) — Tajikistan, China (Yarkand)
- Drassodes involutus (O. Pickard-Cambridge, 1885) — China (Yarkand)
- Drassodes jakkabagensis Charitonov, 1946 — Uzbekistan, Turkmenistan
- Drassodes jiufeng Tang, Song & Zhang, 2001 — China
- Drassodes kaszabi Loksa, 1965 — Russia (south Siberia), Mongolia
- Drassodes katunensis Marusik, Hippa & Koponen, 1996 — Russia (south Siberia)
- Drassodes kibonotensis Tullgren, 1910 — Tanzania
- Drassodes krausi (Roewer, 1961) — Afghanistan
- Drassodes kwantungensis Saito, 1937 — China
- Drassodes lacertosus (O. Pickard-Cambridge, 1872) — Greece, Turkey, Israel, Syria
- Drassodes lapidosus (Walckenaer, 1802) (type) — Europe, Turkey, Israel, Caucasus, Russia (Europe to Far East), Central Asia, China, Korea, Japan
  - Drassodes lapidosus bidens (Simon, 1878) — France
- Drassodes lapsus (O. Pickard-Cambridge, 1885) — China (Yarkand)
- Drassodes licenti Schenkel, 1953 — Mongolia
- Drassodes lindbergi Roewer, 1961 — Afghanistan
- Drassodes lividus Denis, 1958 — Afghanistan
- Drassodes longispinus Marusik & Logunov, 1995 — Russia (south Siberia, Far East), China, Korea
- Drassodes lophognathus Purcell, 1907 — South Africa
- Drassodes luridus (O. Pickard-Cambridge, 1874) — India
- Drassodes luteomicans (Simon, 1878) — Southern Europe
- Drassodes lutescens (C. L. Koch, 1839) — Mediterranean, Ukraine, Caucasus, Russia (Europe) to Central Asia, Pakistan
- Drassodes lyratus Purcell, 1907 — South Africa
- Drassodes lyriger Simon, 1909 — Ethiopia
- Drassodes macilentus (O. Pickard-Cambridge, 1874) — India
- Drassodes malagassicus (Butler, 1880) — Madagascar
- Drassodes mandibularis (L. Koch, 1866) — Russia (Europe)
- Drassodes manducator (Thorell, 1897) — Myanmar
- Drassodes marusiki Esyunin & Zamani, 2019 — Iran
- Drassodes masculus Tucker, 1923 — South Africa
- Drassodes mauritanicus Denis, 1945 — North Africa
- Drassodes meghalayaensis Tikader & Gajbe, 1977 — India
- Drassodes mirus Platnick & Shadab, 1976 — Russia (Far East), North America
- Drassodes montenegrinus (Kulczyński, 1897) — Croatia, Serbia
- Drassodes monticola (Kroneberg, 1875) — Kazakhstan, Uzbekistan, Tajikistan
- Drassodes mylonasi Chatzaki, 2019 — Greece (Rhodes), Israel?
- Drassodes nagqu Song, Zhu & Zhang, 2004 — China
- Drassodes narayanpurensis Gajbe, 2005 — India
- Drassodes natali Esyunin & Tuneva, 2002 — Russia (Europe), Kazakhstan
- Drassodes neglectus (Keyserling, 1887) — Russia (middle to east Siberia, Far East), North America
- Drassodes nox Dönitz & Strand, 1906 — Japan
- Drassodes nugatorius (Karsch, 1881) — Libya, Arabia
- Drassodes obscurus (Lucas, 1846) — Algeria
- Drassodes parauritus Song, Zhu & Zhang, 2004 — China
- Drassodes paroculus Simon, 1893 — Spain
- Drassodes parvidens Caporiacco, 1934 — India, Pakistan
- Drassodes pashanensis Tikader & Gajbe, 1977 — India
- Drassodes pectinifer Schenkel, 1936 — China
- Drassodes persianus Zamani, Chatzaki, Esyunin & Marusik, 2021 — Iran
- Drassodes phagduaensis Tikader, 1964 — Nepal
- Drassodes placidulus Simon, 1914 — France
- Drassodes platnicki Song, Zhu & Zhang, 2004 — Russia (Europe to south Siberia), Mongolia, China
- Drassodes prosthesimiformis Strand, 1906 — Ethiopia
- Drassodes pseudolesserti Loksa, 1965 — Kazakhstan, Mongolia, China
- Drassodes pubescens (Thorell, 1856) — Europe, Turkey, Israel, Caucasus, Russia (Europe to Far East), Iran, Central Asia, China, Japan
- Drassodes robatus Roewer, 1961 — Afghanistan
- Drassodes rostratus Esyunin & Tuneva, 2002 — Russia (Europe), Kazakhstan
- Drassodes rubicundulus Caporiacco, 1934 — India, Pakistan
- Drassodes rubidus (Simon, 1878) — Portugal, Spain, France, Italy (Sardinia)
- Drassodes rugichelis Denis, 1962 — Madeira
- Drassodes russulus (Thorell, 1890) — Indonesia (Java)
- Drassodes saccatus (Emerton, 1890) — North America
- Drassodes saganus Strand, 1918 — Japan
- Drassodes sagarensis Tikader, 1982 — India
- Drassodes saitoi Schenkel, 1963 — China
- Drassodes serratichelis (Roewer, 1928) — Spain (Majorca), Greece, Turkey, Ukraine, Israel. Introduced to USA
- Drassodes serratidens Schenkel, 1963 — Russia (south Siberia to Far East), China, Korea, Japan
- Drassodes sesquidentatus Purcell, 1908 — South Africa
- Drassodes shawanensis Song, Zhu & Zhang, 2004 — China
- Drassodes similis Nosek, 1905 — Turkey
- Drassodes simplex Kulczyński, 1926 — Russia (Kamchatka)
- Drassodes simplicivulvus Caporiacco, 1940 — Ethiopia
- Drassodes singulariformis Roewer, 1951 — India
- Drassodes sirmourensis (Tikader & Gajbe, 1977) — India, China
- Drassodes sitae Tikader & Gajbe, 1975 — India
- Drassodes sockniensis (Karsch, 1881) — Libya
- Drassodes solitarius Purcell, 1907 — South Africa
- Drassodes soussensis Denis, 1956 — Morocco
- Drassodes splendens Tucker, 1923 — South Africa
- Drassodes stationis Tucker, 1923 — South Africa
- Drassodes sternatus Strand, 1906 — Ethiopia
- Drassodes striatus (L. Koch, 1866) — Hungary, Balkans, Romania, Ukraine
- Drassodes subviduatus Strand, 1906 — Ethiopia
- Drassodes taehadongensis Paik, 1995 — Korea
- Drassodes tarrhunensis (Karsch, 1881) — Libya
- Drassodes termezius Roewer, 1961 — Afghanistan
- Drassodes tesselatus Purcell, 1907 — South Africa
- Drassodes thaleri Hervé, 2009 — France
- Drassodes thimei (L. Koch, 1878) — Turkmenistan
- Drassodes tikaderi (Gajbe, 1987) — India
- Drassodes tiritschensis Miller & Buchar, 1972 — Afghanistan
- Drassodes tortuosus Tucker, 1923 — South Africa
- Drassodes unicolor (O. Pickard-Cambridge, 1872) — Greece (Crete), Libya, Egypt, Lebanon, Israel
- Drassodes uritai Tang, Oldemtu, Zhao & Song, 1999 — China
- Drassodes venustus (Nicolet, 1849) — Chile
- Drassodes villosus (Thorell, 1856) — Europe, Turkey, Central Asia, Russia (Europe to Far East)
- Drassodes viveki (Gajbe, 1992) — India
- Drassodes vorax Strand, 1906 — Ethiopia

=== Drassodex ===
Drassodex Murphy, 2007

- Drassodex cervinus (Simon, 1914) — Spain, France
- Drassodex drescoi Hervé, Roberts & Murphy, 2009 — France, Switzerland, Italy
- Drassodex fritillifer (Simon, 1914) — Spain, France
- Drassodex granja Hervé, Roberts & Murphy, 2009 — Spain
- Drassodex heeri (Pavesi, 1873) — Europe
- Drassodex hispanus (L. Koch, 1866) — Europe
- Drassodex hypocrita (Simon, 1878) (type) — Europe
- Drassodex lesserti (Schenkel, 1936) — France, Switzerland
- Drassodex simoni Hervé, Roberts & Murphy, 2009 — France, Switzerland
- Drassodex validior (Simon, 1914) — France

=== Drassyllus ===
Drassyllus Chamberlin, 1922

- Drassyllus adocetus Chamberlin, 1936 — USA
- Drassyllus adullam Levy, 2009 — Israel
- Drassyllus alachua Platnick & Shadab, 1982 — USA
- Drassyllus amamiensis Kamura, 2011 — Japan
- Drassyllus antonito Platnick & Shadab, 1982 — USA, Mexico
- Drassyllus aprilinus (Banks, 1904) — USA, Mexico
- Drassyllus arizonensis (Banks, 1901) — USA, Mexico
- Drassyllus baccus Platnick & Shadab, 1982 — Mexico
- Drassyllus barbus Platnick, 1984 — USA
- Drassyllus biglobus Paik, 1986 — Russia (Far East), Korea
- Drassyllus broussardi Platnick & Horner, 2007 — USA
- Drassyllus callus Platnick & Shadab, 1982 — Mexico
- Drassyllus carbonarius (O. Pickard-Cambridge, 1872) — Israel
- Drassyllus cerrus Platnick & Shadab, 1982 — USA
- Drassyllus chibus Platnick & Shadab, 1982 — Mexico
- Drassyllus coajus Platnick & Shadab, 1982 — Mexico
- Drassyllus conformans Chamberlin, 1936 — USA, Mexico
- Drassyllus coreanus Paik, 1986 — China, Korea
- Drassyllus covensis Exline, 1962 — USA
- Drassyllus creolus Chamberlin & Gertsch, 1940 — USA, Canada
- Drassyllus crimeaensis Kovblyuk, 2003 — Macedonia, Greece, Ukraine, Turkey, Russia (Europe, Caucasus), Azerbaijan
- Drassyllus cyprius Chatzaki & Russell-Smith, 2017 — Cyprus
- Drassyllus dadia Komnenov & Chatzaki, 2016 — Greece, Turkey
- Drassyllus depressus (Emerton, 1890) — USA, Canada, Korea
- Drassyllus dixinus Chamberlin, 1922 — USA
- Drassyllus dromeus Chamberlin, 1922 — USA, Canada
- Drassyllus durango Platnick & Shadab, 1982 — Mexico
- Drassyllus ellipes Chamberlin & Gertsch, 1940 — USA
- Drassyllus eremitus Chamberlin, 1922 — USA, Canada
- Drassyllus eremophilus Chamberlin & Gertsch, 1940 — USA, Canada
- Drassyllus eurus Platnick & Shadab, 1982 — USA
- Drassyllus excavatus (Schenkel, 1963) — China
- Drassyllus fallens Chamberlin, 1922 (type) — USA, Canada
- Drassyllus fractus Chamberlin, 1936 — USA
- Drassyllus fragilis Ponomarev, 2008 — Kazakhstan
- Drassyllus frigidus (Banks, 1892) — USA
- Drassyllus gammus Platnick & Shadab, 1982 — Mexico
- Drassyllus gynosaphes Chamberlin, 1936 — USA
- Drassyllus huachuca Platnick & Shadab, 1982 — USA
- Drassyllus inanus Chamberlin & Gertsch, 1940 — USA
- Drassyllus insularis (Banks, 1900) — North America
- Drassyllus jabalpurensis Gajbe, 2005 — India
- Drassyllus jubatopalpis Levy, 1998 — Turkey, Israel
- Drassyllus khajuriai Tikader & Gajbe, 1976 — India
- Drassyllus lamprus (Chamberlin, 1920) — North America
- Drassyllus lepidus (Banks, 1899) — USA, Mexico
- Drassyllus louisianus Chamberlin, 1922 — USA
- Drassyllus lutetianus (L. Koch, 1866) — Europe to Kazakhstan
- Drassyllus mahabalei Tikader, 1982 — India
- Drassyllus mazus Platnick & Shadab, 1982 — Mexico
- Drassyllus mexicanus (Banks, 1898) — USA, Mexico
- Drassyllus mirus Platnick & Shadab, 1982 — Mexico
- Drassyllus mormon Chamberlin, 1936 — USA, Mexico
- Drassyllus mumai Gertsch & Riechert, 1976 — USA, Mexico
- Drassyllus nannellus Chamberlin & Gertsch, 1940 — USA, Canada
- Drassyllus niger (Banks, 1896) — USA, Canada
- Drassyllus notonus Chamberlin, 1928 — USA, Mexico
- Drassyllus novus (Banks, 1895) — USA, Canada
- Drassyllus ojus Platnick & Shadab, 1982 — USA, Mexico
- Drassyllus orgilus Chamberlin, 1922 — USA, Mexico
- Drassyllus orlando Platnick & Corey, 1989 — USA
- Drassyllus pantherius Hu & Wu, 1989 — China
- Drassyllus platnicki Gajbe, 1987 — India
- Drassyllus praeficus (L. Koch, 1866) — Europe to Central Asia
- Drassyllus proclesis Chamberlin, 1922 — USA
- Drassyllus prosaphes Chamberlin, 1936 — USA, Mexico
- Drassyllus pseudovinealis Kim, Yoo & Lee, 2018 — Korea
- Drassyllus puebla Platnick & Shadab, 1982 — Mexico
- Drassyllus pumiloides Chatzaki, 2003 — Greece (Crete)
- Drassyllus pumilus (C. L. Koch, 1839) — Europe to Central Asia
- Drassyllus pusillus (C. L. Koch, 1833) — Europe, Turkey, Caucasus, Russia (Europe to Far East), Central Asia, China
- Drassyllus ratnagiriensis Tikader & Gajbe, 1976 — India
- Drassyllus rufulus (Banks, 1892) — USA, Canada
- Drassyllus salton Platnick & Shadab, 1982 — USA
- Drassyllus sanmenensis Platnick & Song, 1986 — Russia (Far East), China, Korea, Japan
- Drassyllus saphes Chamberlin, 1936 — North America
- Drassyllus sasakawai Kamura, 1987 — Korea, Japan
- Drassyllus seminolus Chamberlin & Gertsch, 1940 — USA
- Drassyllus shaanxiensis Platnick & Song, 1986 — Russia (Caucasus) to China, Korea, Japan
- Drassyllus sinton Platnick & Shadab, 1982 — USA, Mexico
- Drassyllus socius Chamberlin, 1922 — USA, Canada
- Drassyllus sonus Platnick & Shadab, 1982 — Mexico
- Drassyllus sur Tuneva & Esyunin, 2003 — Turkey, Russia (Europe, Urals), Kazakhstan, Iran
- Drassyllus talus Platnick & Shadab, 1982 — Mexico
- Drassyllus tepus Platnick & Shadab, 1982 — Mexico
- Drassyllus texamans Chamberlin, 1936 — USA, Mexico
- Drassyllus tinus Platnick & Shadab, 1982 — Mexico
- Drassyllus villicoides (Giltay, 1932) — Greece
- Drassyllus villicus (Thorell, 1875) — Europe, Azerbaijan
- Drassyllus villus Platnick & Shadab, 1982 — Mexico
- Drassyllus vinealis (Kulczyński, 1897) — Central to Eastern Europe, Turkey, Caucasus, Russia (Europe to Far East), Kazakhstan, China, Korea, Japan
- Drassyllus yaginumai Kamura, 1987 — Korea, Japan
- Drassyllus yunnanensis Platnick & Song, 1986 — China, Myanmar
- Drassyllus zimus Platnick & Shadab, 1982 — Mexico

== E ==
=== Echemella ===
Echemella Strand, 1906

- Echemella occulta (Benoit, 1965) — Congo
- Echemella pavesii (Simon, 1909) — Ethiopia
- Echemella quinquedentata Strand, 1906 (type) — Ethiopia
- Echemella sinuosa Murphy & Russell-Smith, 2007 — Ethiopia
- Echemella strandi (Caporiacco, 1940) — Ethiopia
- Echemella tenuis Murphy & Russell-Smith, 2007 — Ethiopia

=== Echemographis ===
Echemographis Caporiacco, 1955

- Echemographis distincta Caporiacco, 1955 (type) — Venezuela

=== Echemoides ===
Echemoides Mello-Leitão, 1938

- Echemoides aguilari Platnick & Shadab, 1979 — Peru
- Echemoides argentinus (Mello-Leitão, 1940) — Argentina
- Echemoides balsa Platnick & Shadab, 1979 — Argentina
- Echemoides cekalovici Platnick, 1983 — Chile
- Echemoides chilensis Platnick, 1983 — Chile
- Echemoides gayi (Simon, 1904) — Chile
- Echemoides giganteus Mello-Leitão, 1938 (type) — Argentina
- Echemoides illapel Platnick & Shadab, 1979 — Chile
- Echemoides malleco Platnick & Shadab, 1979 — Chile
- Echemoides mauryi Platnick & Shadab, 1979 — Paraguay, Argentina
- Echemoides penai Platnick & Shadab, 1979 — Peru, Chile
- Echemoides penicillatus (Mello-Leitão, 1942) — Paraguay, Argentina
- Echemoides rossi Platnick & Shadab, 1979 — Chile
- Echemoides schlingeri Platnick & Shadab, 1979 — Chile
- Echemoides tofo Platnick & Shadab, 1979 — Chile

=== Echemus ===
Echemus Simon, 1878

- Echemus angustifrons (Westring, 1861) (type) — Europe to Central Asia
  - Echemus angustifrons balticus (Lohmander, 1942) — Sweden
- Echemus chaetognathus (Thorell, 1887) — Myanmar
- Echemus chaperi Simon, 1885 — India
- Echemus chebanus (Thorell, 1897) — Myanmar
- Echemus chialanus Thorell, 1897 — Myanmar
- Echemus dilutus (L. Koch, 1873) — Australia (Queensland)
- Echemus erutus Tucker, 1923 — South Africa
- Echemus escalerai Simon, 1909 — Morocco
- Echemus ghecuanus (Thorell, 1897) — Myanmar
- Echemus hamipalpis (Kroneberg, 1875) — Uzbekistan
- Echemus incinctus Simon, 1907 — West Africa
- Echemus inermis Mello-Leitão, 1939 — Brazil
- Echemus lacertosus Simon, 1907 — São Tomé and Príncipe
- Echemus levyi Kovblyuk & Seyyar, 2009 — Turkey
- Echemus modestus Kulczyński, 1899 — Madeira
- Echemus orinus (Thorell, 1897) — Myanmar
- Echemus pictus Kulczyński, 1911 — Indonesia (Java)
- Echemus plapoensis (Thorell, 1897) — Myanmar
- Echemus scutatus (Simon, 1880) — Algeria
- Echemus sibiricus Marusik & Logunov, 1995 — Russia (south Siberia)
- Echemus viveki Gajbe, 1989 — India

=== Eilica ===
Eilica Keyserling, 1891

- Eilica albopunctata (Hogg, 1896) — Australia (South Australia, Queensland)
- Eilica amambay Platnick, 1985 — Brazil, Paraguay
- Eilica bedourie Platnick, 1985 — Australia (Queensland)
- Eilica bicolor Banks, 1896 — USA to Honduras, Cuba, Jamaica
- Eilica bonda Müller, 1987 — Colombia
- Eilica chickeringi Platnick, 1975 — Panama
- Eilica cincta (Simon, 1893) — West, Central Africa
- Eilica contacta Platnick, 1975 — Australia (Queensland, New South Wales)
- Eilica daviesae Platnick, 1985 — Australia (Queensland)
- Eilica fusca Platnick, 1975 — South Africa
- Eilica giga FitzPatrick, 1994 — Zimbabwe
- Eilica kandarpae Nigam & Patel, 1996 — India
- Eilica lotzi FitzPatrick, 2002 — South Africa
- Eilica maculipes (Vellard, 1925) — Brazil
- Eilica marchantaria Brescovit & Höfer, 1993 — Brazil
- Eilica modesta Keyserling, 1891 (type) — Brazil, Uruguay, Argentina
- Eilica mullaroo Platnick, 1988 — Australia (Victoria)
- Eilica myrmecophila (Simon, 1903) — Peru, Argentina
- Eilica obscura (Keyserling, 1891) — Brazil
- Eilica platnicki Tikader & Gajbe, 1977 — India
- Eilica pomposa Medan, 2001 — Brazil, Argentina
- Eilica rotunda Platnick, 1975 — Australia (Queensland)
- Eilica rufithorax (Simon, 1893) — Venezuela, Brazil
- Eilica serrata Platnick, 1975 — Australia (Queensland, Western Australia)
- Eilica songadhensis Patel, 1988 — India
- Eilica tikaderi Platnick, 1976 — India
- Eilica trilineata (Mello-Leitão, 1941) — Argentina, Chile, Brazil
- Eilica uniformis (Schiapelli & Gerschman, 1942) — Argentina

=== Eleleis ===
Eleleis Simon, 1893

- Eleleis crinita Simon, 1893 (type) — South Africa

=== Encoptarthria ===
Encoptarthria Main, 1954

- Encoptarthria echemophthalma (Simon, 1908) (type) — Australia (Western Australia)
- Encoptarthria grisea (L. Koch, 1873) — Australia
- Encoptarthria penicillata (Simon, 1908) — Australia (Western Australia)
- Encoptarthria perpusilla (Simon, 1908) — Australia (Western Australia)
- Encoptarthria vestigator (Simon, 1908) — Australia (Western Australia)

=== Epicharitus ===
Epicharitus Rainbow, 1916

- Epicharitus leucosemus Rainbow, 1916 (type) — Australia (Queensland)

== F ==
=== Fedotovia ===
Fedotovia Charitonov, 1946

- Fedotovia feti Fomichev & Marusik, 2015 — Mongolia
- Fedotovia mikhailovi Fomichev & Marusik, 2015 — Mongolia
- Fedotovia mongolica Marusik, 1993 — Mongolia
- Fedotovia uzbekistanica Charitonov, 1946 (type) — Central Asia, Iran, Afghanistan

== G ==
=== Gertschosa ===
Gertschosa Platnick & Shadab, 1981

- Gertschosa amphiloga (Chamberlin, 1936) — USA, Mexico
- Gertschosa cincta (Banks, 1929) — Panama
- Gertschosa concinna (Simon, 1895) (type) — Mexico
- Gertschosa palisadoes Platnick & Shadab, 1981 — Jamaica

=== Gnaphosa ===
Gnaphosa

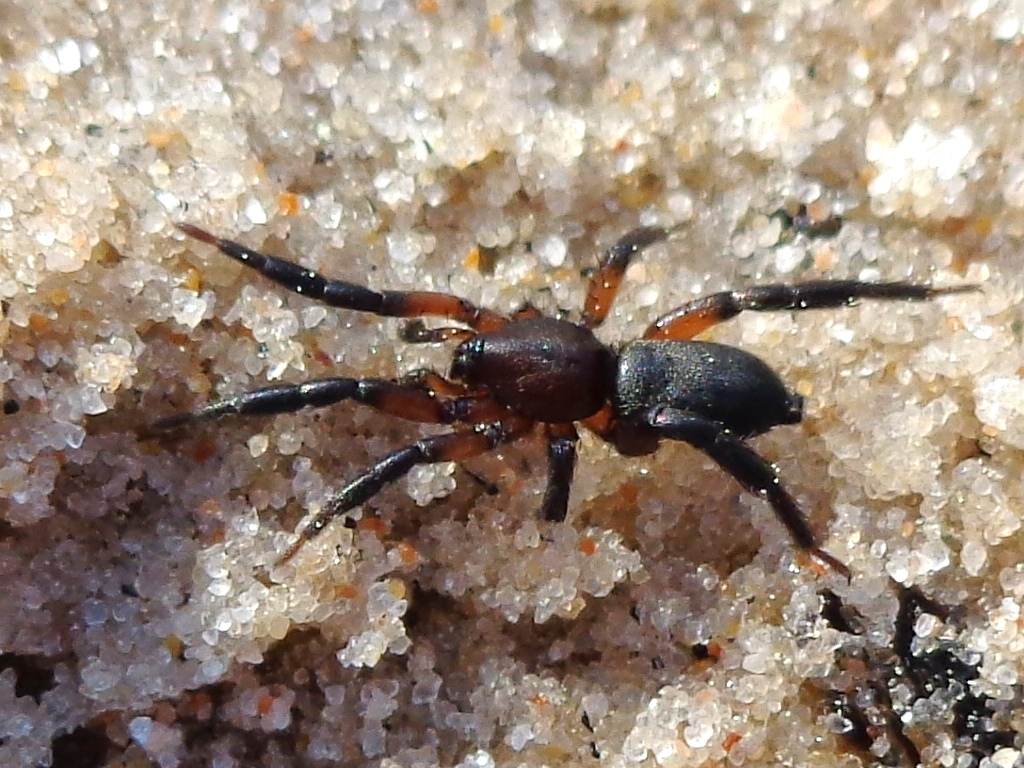
Gnaphosa bicolor

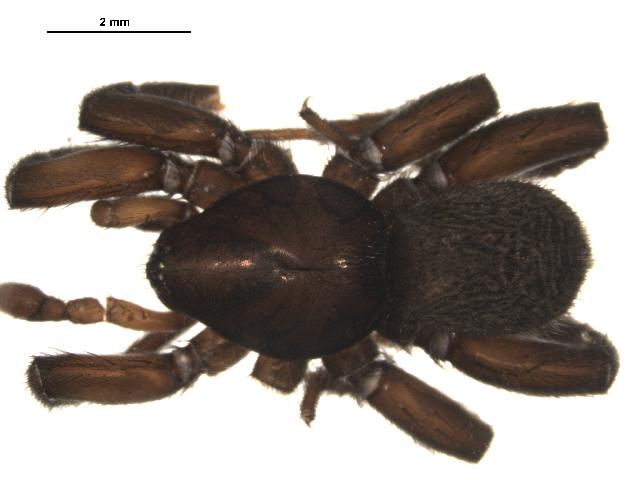
Gnaphosa borea

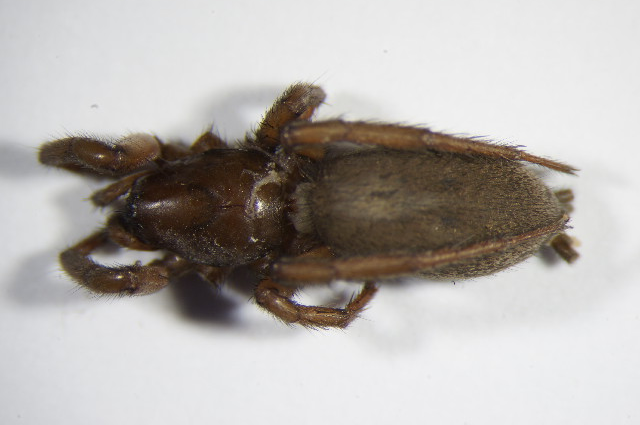
Gnaphosa opaca

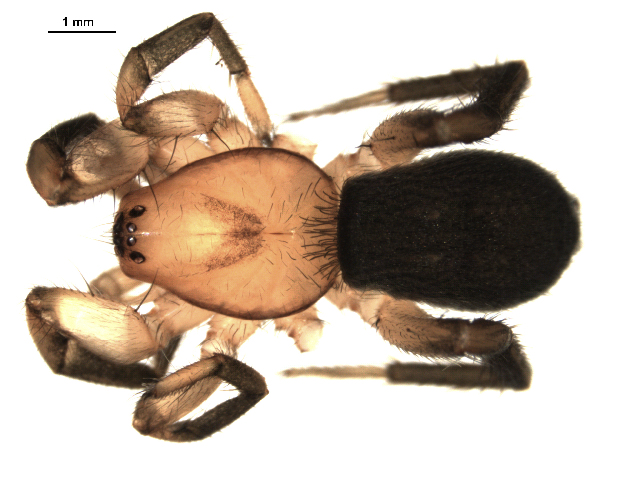
Gnaphosa sericata

Gnaphosa Latreille, 1804

- Gnaphosa aborigena Tyschchenko, 1965 — Kazakhstan
- Gnaphosa akagiensis Hayashi, 1994 — Japan
- Gnaphosa alacris Simon, 1878 — France, Italy, Croatia, Morocco
- Gnaphosa alpica Simon, 1878 — France, Switzerland, Austria
- Gnaphosa altudona Chamberlin, 1922 — USA
- Gnaphosa antipola Chamberlin, 1933 — USA, Canada
- Gnaphosa artaensis Wunderlich, 2011 — Portugal, Spain (Balearic Is.)
- Gnaphosa atramentaria Simon, 1878 — France
- Gnaphosa azerbaidzhanica Tuneva & Esyunin, 2003 — Azerbaijan
- Gnaphosa badia (L. Koch, 1866) — Europe to Azerbaijan
- Gnaphosa balearicola Strand, 1942 — Spain (Balearic Is.)
- Gnaphosa banini Marusik & Koponen, 2001 — Russia (south Siberia), Mongolia
- Gnaphosa basilicata Simon, 1882 — Italy
- Gnaphosa belyaevi Ovtsharenko, Platnick & Song, 1992 — Mongolia
- Gnaphosa betpaki Ovtsharenko, Platnick & Song, 1992 — Russia (Urals), Kazakhstan
- Gnaphosa bicolor (Hahn, 1833) — Europe, Turkey, Caucasus, Russia (Europe to west Siberia)
- Gnaphosa bithynica Kulczyński, 1903 — Greece (Crete), Turkey, Lebanon, Israel, Jordan, Iran
- Gnaphosa borea Kulczyński, 1908 — Russia (middle Siberia to Far East), North America
- Gnaphosa brumalis Thorell, 1875 — USA, Canada
- Gnaphosa californica Banks, 1904 — USA, Canada
- Gnaphosa campanulata Zhang & Song, 2001 — China
- Gnaphosa cantabrica Simon, 1914 — Spain, France
- Gnaphosa caucasica Ovtsharenko, Platnick & Song, 1992 — Russia (Caucasus)
- Gnaphosa chiapas Platnick & Shadab, 1975 — Mexico
- Gnaphosa chihuahua Platnick & Shadab, 1975 — Mexico
- Gnaphosa chola Ovtsharenko & Marusik, 1988 — Russia (middle Siberia to Far East), Mongolia, China
- Gnaphosa clara (Keyserling, 1887) — North America
- Gnaphosa corticola Simon, 1914 — France
- Gnaphosa cumensis Ponomarev, 1981 — Ukraine, Russia (Europe), Kazakhstan, Mongolia
- Gnaphosa cyrenaica (Caporiacco, 1949) — Libya
- Gnaphosa danieli Miller & Buchar, 1972 — Afghanistan
- Gnaphosa dege Ovtsharenko, Platnick & Song, 1992 — Kyrgyzstan, Pakistan, India, China
- Gnaphosa dentata Platnick & Shadab, 1975 — USA
- Gnaphosa deserta Ponomarev & Dvadnenko, 2011 — Russia (Europe)
- Gnaphosa dolanskyi Řezáč, Růžička, Oger & Řezáčová, 2018 — South-eastern Europe, Ukraine, Russia (Europe), Turkey, Caucasus
- Gnaphosa dolosa Herman, 1879 — Southern to Eastern Europe, Turkey, Syria, Iraq, Iran, Caucasus, Russia (Europe) to Central Asia
- Gnaphosa donensis Ponomarev, 2015 — Russia (Europe)
- Gnaphosa eskovi Ovtsharenko, Platnick & Song, 1992 — Kazakhstan
- Gnaphosa esyunini Marusik, Fomichev & Omelko, 2014 — Mongolia
- Gnaphosa eucalyptus Ghafoor & Beg, 2002 — Pakistan
- Gnaphosa fagei Schenkel, 1963 — Kazakhstan, China
- Gnaphosa fallax Herman, 1879 — Hungary
- Gnaphosa fontinalis Keyserling, 1887 — USA, Mexico
- Gnaphosa funerea (Dalmas, 1921) — St. Helena
- Gnaphosa gracilior Kulczyński, 1901 — Russia (middle and south Siberia to Far East), Mongolia, China
- Gnaphosa haarlovi Denis, 1958 — Central Asia
- Gnaphosa halophila Esyunin & Efimik, 1997 — Russia (Urals)
- Gnaphosa hastata Fox, 1937 — China, Korea
- Gnaphosa hirsutipes Banks, 1901 — USA, Mexico
- Gnaphosa iberica Simon, 1878 — Spain
- Gnaphosa ilika Ovtsharenko, Platnick & Song, 1992 — Kazakhstan, Kyrgyzstan, Uzbekistan
- Gnaphosa inconspecta Simon, 1878 — Western and Central Europe, Italy, Russia (middle Siberia to Far East), Mongolia, China, Korea
- Gnaphosa jodhpurensis Tikader & Gajbe, 1977 — India, China
- Gnaphosa jucunda Thorell, 1875 — Ukraine, Russia (Europe, Caucasus)
- Gnaphosa kailana Tikader, 1966 — India
- Gnaphosa kamurai Ovtsharenko, Platnick & Song, 1992 — Korea, Japan
- Gnaphosa kankhalae Biswas & Roy, 2008 — India
- Gnaphosa kansuensis Schenkel, 1936 — Russia (Far East), China, Korea
- Gnaphosa ketmer Tuneva, 2004 — Kazakhstan
- Gnaphosa khovdensis Marusik, Fomichev & Omelko, 2014 — Mongolia
- Gnaphosa kompirensis Bösenberg & Strand, 1906 — Russia (Far East), China, Korea, Taiwan, Japan, Vietnam
- Gnaphosa koponeni Marusik & Omelko, 2014 — Russia (south Siberia)
- Gnaphosa kuldzha Ovtsharenko, Platnick & Song, 1992 — Turkmenistan, Kyrgyzstan
- Gnaphosa kurchak Ovtsharenko, Platnick & Song, 1992 — Kyrgyzstan
- Gnaphosa lapponum (L. Koch, 1866) — Europe, Russia (Europe to west Siberia)
  - Gnaphosa lapponum inermis Strand, 1899 — Norway
- Gnaphosa leporina (L. Koch, 1866) — Europe, Turkey, Caucasus, Russia (Europe to south Siberia), Central Asia, China
- Gnaphosa licenti Schenkel, 1953 — Russia (Europe to south Siberia), Kazakhstan, Kyrgyzstan, Mongolia, China, Korea
- Gnaphosa limbata Strand, 1900 — Norway
- Gnaphosa lonai Caporiacco, 1949 — Italy
- Gnaphosa lucifuga (Walckenaer, 1802) (type) — Europe, Turkey, Caucasus, Iran, Russia (Europe to south Siberia), Kazakhstan, China
  - Gnaphosa lucifuga minor Nosek, 1905 — Turkey
- Gnaphosa lugubris (C. L. Koch, 1839) — Europe to Central Asia
- Gnaphosa mandschurica Schenkel, 1963 — Russia (middle and south Siberia), Kazakhstan, Mongolia, China, Nepal
- Gnaphosa maritima Platnick & Shadab, 1975 — USA, Mexico
- Gnaphosa mcheidzeae Mikhailov, 1998 — Georgia
- Gnaphosa microps Holm, 1939 — North America, Europe, Turkey, Russia (Europe to Far East)
- Gnaphosa modestior Kulczyński, 1897 — Italy, Austria, Czechia to Romania
- Gnaphosa moerens O. Pickard-Cambridge, 1885 — China, Nepal
- Gnaphosa moesta Thorell, 1875 — Hungary, Romania, Ukraine, Russia (Europe)?
- Gnaphosa mongolica Simon, 1895 — Turkey, Hungary to China
- Gnaphosa montana (L. Koch, 1866) — Europe, Turkey, Russia (Europe to south Siberia), Kazakhstan
- Gnaphosa muscorum (L. Koch, 1866) — North America, Europe, Caucasus, Russia (Europe to Far East), Kazakhstan, China, Korea
  - Gnaphosa muscorum gaunitzi Tullgren, 1955 — Sweden, Russia (south Siberia)
- Gnaphosa namulinensis Hu, 2001 — China
- Gnaphosa nigerrima L. Koch, 1877 — Europe, Russia (Europe to Far East)
- Gnaphosa nordlandica Strand, 1900 — Norway
- Gnaphosa norvegica Strand, 1900 — Norway
- Gnaphosa occidentalis Simon, 1878 — Western Europe
- Gnaphosa oceanica Simon, 1878 — France
- Gnaphosa ogeri Lecigne, 2018 — France
- Gnaphosa oligerae Ovtsharenko & Platnick, 1998 — Russia (Far East)
- Gnaphosa opaca Herman, 1879 — Europe to Central Asia
- Gnaphosa orites Chamberlin, 1922 — North America, Northern Europe, Caucasus, Russia (Europe to Far East)
- Gnaphosa ovchinnikovi Ovtsharenko, Platnick & Song, 1992 — Kyrgyzstan
- Gnaphosa pakistanica Ovtchinnikov, Ahmad & Inayatullah, 2008 — Pakistan
- Gnaphosa parvula Banks, 1896 — USA, Canada
- Gnaphosa pauriensis Tikader & Gajbe, 1977 — India
- Gnaphosa pengi Zhang & Yin, 2001 — China
- Gnaphosa perplexa Denis, 1958 — Afghanistan
- Gnaphosa petrobia L. Koch, 1872 — Europe, Iran
- Gnaphosa pilosa Savelyeva, 1972 — Kazakhstan
- Gnaphosa poonaensis Tikader, 1973 — India
- Gnaphosa porrecta Strand, 1900 — Norway
- Gnaphosa potanini Simon, 1895 — Russia (south Siberia, Far East), Mongolia, China, Korea, Japan
- Gnaphosa potosi Platnick & Shadab, 1975 — Mexico
- Gnaphosa primorica Ovtsharenko, Platnick & Song, 1992 — Russia (Far East), Japan
- Gnaphosa prosperi Simon, 1878 — Spain
- Gnaphosa pseashcho Ovtsharenko, Platnick & Song, 1992 — Russia (Caucasus)
- Gnaphosa pseudoleporina Ovtsharenko, Platnick & Song, 1992 — Russia (south Siberia)
- Gnaphosa rasnitsyni Marusik, 1993 — Mongolia
- Gnaphosa reikhardi Ovtsharenko, Platnick & Song, 1992 — Kazakhstan, Kyrgyzstan
- Gnaphosa rhenana Müller & Schenkel, 1895 — France, Switzerland, Germany, Austria, Italy, Romania, Albania
- Gnaphosa rohtakensis Gajbe, 1992 — India
- Gnaphosa rufula (L. Koch, 1866) — Slovakia, Hungary, Ukraine, Russia (Europe), Kazakhstan
- Gnaphosa salsa Platnick & Shadab, 1975 — USA, Mexico
- Gnaphosa sandersi Gertsch & Davis, 1940 — Mexico
- Gnaphosa saurica Ovtsharenko, Platnick & Song, 1992 — Ukraine, Caucasus, Iran, Russia (Europe) to Central Asia
- Gnaphosa saxosa Platnick & Shadab, 1975 — USA
- Gnaphosa secreta Simon, 1878 — France
- Gnaphosa sericata (L. Koch, 1866) — USA to Guatemala, Cuba
- Gnaphosa serzonshteini Fomichev & Marusik, 2017 — Mongolia
- Gnaphosa similis Kulczyński, 1926 — Russia (middle and south Siberia to Far East), China, Korea
- Gnaphosa sinensis Simon, 1880 — China, Korea
- Gnaphosa snohomish Platnick & Shadab, 1975 — USA, Canada
- Gnaphosa songi Zhang, 2001 — China
- Gnaphosa sonora Platnick & Shadab, 1975 — Mexico
- Gnaphosa steppica Ovtsharenko, Platnick & Song, 1992 — Turkey, Caucasus, Ukraine, Russia (Europe to south Siberia), Kazakhstan
- Gnaphosa sticta Kulczyński, 1908 — Scandinavia, Russia (Europe to Far East), Japan
- Gnaphosa stoliczkai O. Pickard-Cambridge, 1885 — Mongolia, China
- Gnaphosa stussineri Simon, 1885 — Greece
- Gnaphosa synthetica Chamberlin, 1924 — USA, Mexico
- Gnaphosa tarabaevi Ovtsharenko, Platnick & Song, 1992 — Kazakhstan, Kyrgyzstan
- Gnaphosa taurica Thorell, 1875 — Bulgaria to China
- Gnaphosa tenebrosa Fox, 1938 — probably Mexico
- Gnaphosa tetrica Simon, 1878 — France, Macedonia
- Gnaphosa tigrina Simon, 1878 — Mediterranean, Russia (Europe, south Siberia)
- Gnaphosa tumd Tang, Song & Zhang, 2001 — China
- Gnaphosa tunevae Marusik & Omelko, 2014 — Mongolia
- Gnaphosa tuvinica Marusik & Logunov, 1992 — Russia (west and south Siberia), Mongolia
- Gnaphosa ukrainica Ovtsharenko, Platnick & Song, 1992 — Ukraine, Russia (Europe to Central Asia), Iran, Turkmenistan
- Gnaphosa utahana Banks, 1904 — USA
- Gnaphosa wiehlei Schenkel, 1963 — Russia (south Siberia), Mongolia, China
- Gnaphosa xieae Zhang & Yin, 2001 — China
- Gnaphosa zeugitana Pavesi, 1880 — North Africa
- Gnaphosa zhaoi Ovtsharenko, Platnick & Song, 1992 — China
- Gnaphosa zonsteini Ovtsharenko, Platnick & Song, 1992 — Kyrgyzstan
- Gnaphosa zyuzini Ovtsharenko, Platnick & Song, 1992 — Kazakhstan

== H ==
=== Haplodrassus ===
Haplodrassus

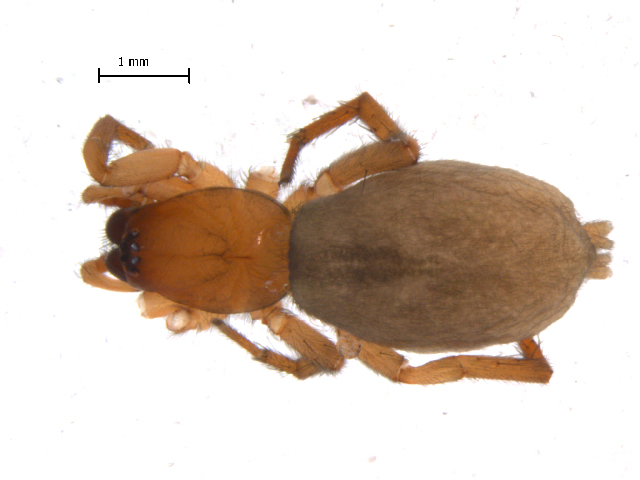
Haplodrassus bicornis

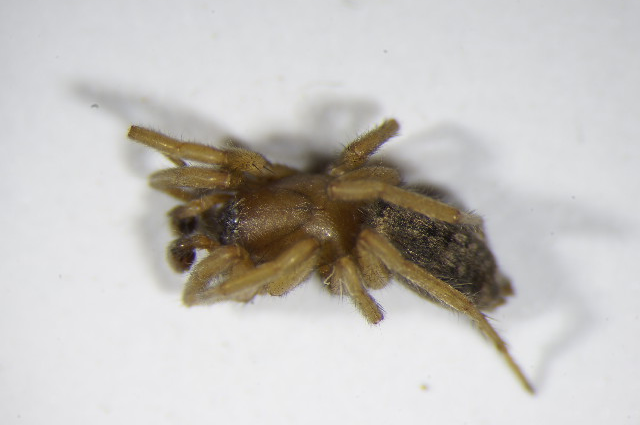
Haplodrassus dalmatensis

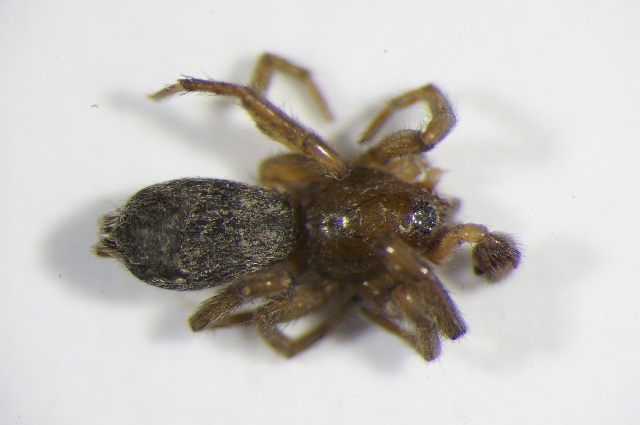
Haplodrassus kulczynskii

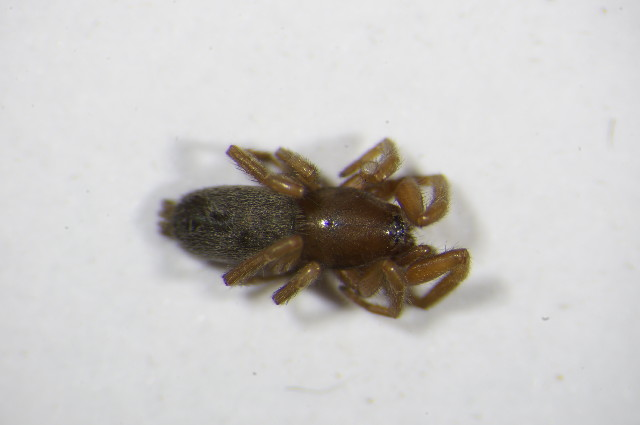
Haplodrassus minor

Haplodrassus Chamberlin, 1922

- Haplodrassus aenus Thaler, 1984 — Switzerland, Austria
- Haplodrassus alexeevi Ponomarev & Shmatko, 2017 — Russia (Europe)
- Haplodrassus ambalaensis Gajbe, 1992 — India
- Haplodrassus atarot Levy, 2004 — Israel
- Haplodrassus belgeri Ovtsharenko & Marusik, 1988 — Russia (south to northeast Siberia, Far East)
- Haplodrassus bengalensis Gajbe, 1992 — India
- Haplodrassus bicornis (Emerton, 1909) — USA, Canada
- Haplodrassus bohemicus Miller & Buchar, 1977 — Czech Rep., Macedonia, Greece, Ukraine?, Russia (Europe, Caucasus)?
- Haplodrassus canariensis Schmidt, 1977 — Canary Is.
- Haplodrassus caspius Ponomarev & Belosludtsev, 2008 — Russia (Europe, Caucasus), Azerbaijan, Iran, Kazakhstan
- Haplodrassus caucasius Ponomarev & Dvadnenko, 2013 — Caucasus (Russia, Georgia)
- Haplodrassus chamberlini Platnick & Shadab, 1975 — North America
- Haplodrassus chotanagpurensis Gajbe, 1987 — India
- Haplodrassus cognatus (Westring, 1861) — Europe, Russia (Europe to Far East), Caucasus, Kazakhstan, Japan
  - Haplodrassus cognatus ermolajewi Lohmander, 1942 — Russia (west Siberia)
- Haplodrassus concertor (Simon, 1878) — France
- Haplodrassus crassipes (Lucas, 1846) — Morocco, Algeria
- Haplodrassus creticus (Roewer, 1928) — Greece (Crete)
- Haplodrassus dalmatensis (L. Koch, 1866) — Europe, North Africa, Turkey, Middle East, Russia (Europe) to Central Asia
  - Haplodrassus dalmatensis pictus (Thorell, 1875) — Spain, Madeira
- Haplodrassus dentatus Xu & Song, 1987 — China
- Haplodrassus dentifer Bosmans & Abrous, 2018 — Morocco, Algeria, Tunisia, Spain
- Haplodrassus deserticola Schmidt & Krause, 1996 — Canary Is.
- Haplodrassus dixiensis Chamberlin & Woodbury, 1929 — USA
- Haplodrassus dumdumensis Tikader, 1982 — India
- Haplodrassus eunis Chamberlin, 1922 — USA, Canada
- Haplodrassus hatsushibai Kamura, 2007 — Japan
- Haplodrassus hiemalis (Emerton, 1909) (type) — North America, Russia (Europe to Far East)
- Haplodrassus huarong Yin & Bao, 2012 — China
- Haplodrassus hunanensis Yin & Bao, 2012 — China
- Haplodrassus ibericus Melic, Silva & Barrientos, 2016 — Portugal, Spain
- Haplodrassus invalidus (O. Pickard-Cambridge, 1872) — Egypt, Cyprus, Turkey, Israel, Azerbaijan, Greece?
- Haplodrassus ivlievi Ponomarev, 2015 — Russia (Europe)
- Haplodrassus jacobi Gajbe, 1992 — India
- Haplodrassus kanenoi Kamura, 1995 — Japan
- Haplodrassus kulczynskii Lohmander, 1942 — Europe, Turkey, Russia (Europe to Far East), China, Korea
- Haplodrassus lilliputanus Levy, 2004 — Israel
- Haplodrassus longivulva Bosmans & Hervé, 2018 — Morocco, Algeria
- Haplodrassus lyndae Abrous & Bosmans, 2018 — Morocco, Algeria, Spain
- Haplodrassus macellinus (Thorell, 1871) — France, Italy, Portugal?, Spain?
- Haplodrassus maculatus (Banks, 1904) — USA, Mexico
- Haplodrassus mayumiae Kamura, 2007 — Korea, Japan
- Haplodrassus mediterraneus Levy, 2004 — Turkey, Syria, Lebanon, Israel, Jordan
- Haplodrassus mimus Chamberlin, 1922 — USA
- Haplodrassus minor (O. Pickard-Cambridge, 1879) — Europe, Turkey
- Haplodrassus moderatus (Kulczyński, 1897) — Europe, Russia (Europe to Far East), China
- Haplodrassus montanus Paik & Sohn, 1984 — Russia (Far East), China, Korea
- Haplodrassus morosus (O. Pickard-Cambridge, 1872) — Greece, Turkey, Israel
- Haplodrassus nigroscriptus (Simon, 1909) — Morocco
- Haplodrassus nojimai Kamura, 2007 — Japan
- Haplodrassus omissus (O. Pickard-Cambridge, 1872) — Canary Is., Morocco, Mediterranean
- Haplodrassus orientalis (L. Koch, 1866) — Greece, Ukraine, Russia (Europe), Kazakhstan
- Haplodrassus ovatus Bosmans & Hervé, 2018 — Algeria, Tunisia
- Haplodrassus ovtchinnikovi Ponomarev, 2008 — Turkey, Iran, Kazakhstan
- Haplodrassus paramecus Zhang, Song & Zhu, 2001 — China
- Haplodrassus pargongsanensis Paik, 1992 — Korea
- Haplodrassus ponomarevi Kovblyuk & Seyyar, 2009 — Greece, Turkey
- Haplodrassus pseudosignifer Marusik, Hippa & Koponen, 1996 — Ukraine, Russia (Europe to Central Asia), Iran
- Haplodrassus pugnans (Simon, 1880) — Israel, Russia (Europe to Far East), China, Japan
- Haplodrassus reginae Schmidt & Krause, 1998 — Cape Verde Is.
- Haplodrassus rhodanicus (Simon, 1914) — Portugal, Spain, France, Italy (Sardinia), Tunisia
- Haplodrassus rufipes (Lucas, 1846) — Morocco, Algeria, Tunisia, Portugal, Spain, France, Italy
- Haplodrassus rufus (Savelyeva, 1972) — Kazakhstan
- Haplodrassus rugosus Tuneva, 2004 — Kazakhstan
- Haplodrassus sataraensis Tikader & Gajbe, 1977 — India
- Haplodrassus securifer Bosmans & Abrous, 2018 — Morocco, Algeria, Tunisia, Portugal, Spain, France, Italy, Belgium
- Haplodrassus signifer (C. L. Koch, 1839) — North America, Europe, North Africa, Turkey, Israel, Caucasus, Russia (Europe to Far East), Central Asia, China, Korea
- Haplodrassus silvestris (Blackwall, 1833) — Europe, Turkey, Caucasus
- Haplodrassus soerenseni (Strand, 1900) — Europe, Turkey, Caucasus, Russia (Europe to Far East), Kazakhstan, China
- Haplodrassus stuxbergi (L. Koch, 1879) — Russia (west to middle Siberia)
- Haplodrassus taepaikensis Paik, 1992 — Russia (south Siberia, Far East), Korea
- Haplodrassus taibo (Chamberlin, 1919) — USA
- Haplodrassus tegulatus (Schenkel, 1963) — Russia (south Siberia), China
- Haplodrassus tehriensis Tikader & Gajbe, 1977 — India
- Haplodrassus triangularis Bosmans, 2018 — Morocco, Tunisia
- Haplodrassus typhon (Simon, 1878) — Algeria, Tunisia, Portugal, Spain, France, Italy (Sardinia)
- Haplodrassus umbratilis (L. Koch, 1866) — Europe to Kazakhstan
  - Haplodrassus umbratilis gothicus Lohmander, 1942 — Sweden
- Haplodrassus vastus (Hu, 1989) — China

=== Herpyllus ===
Herpyllus

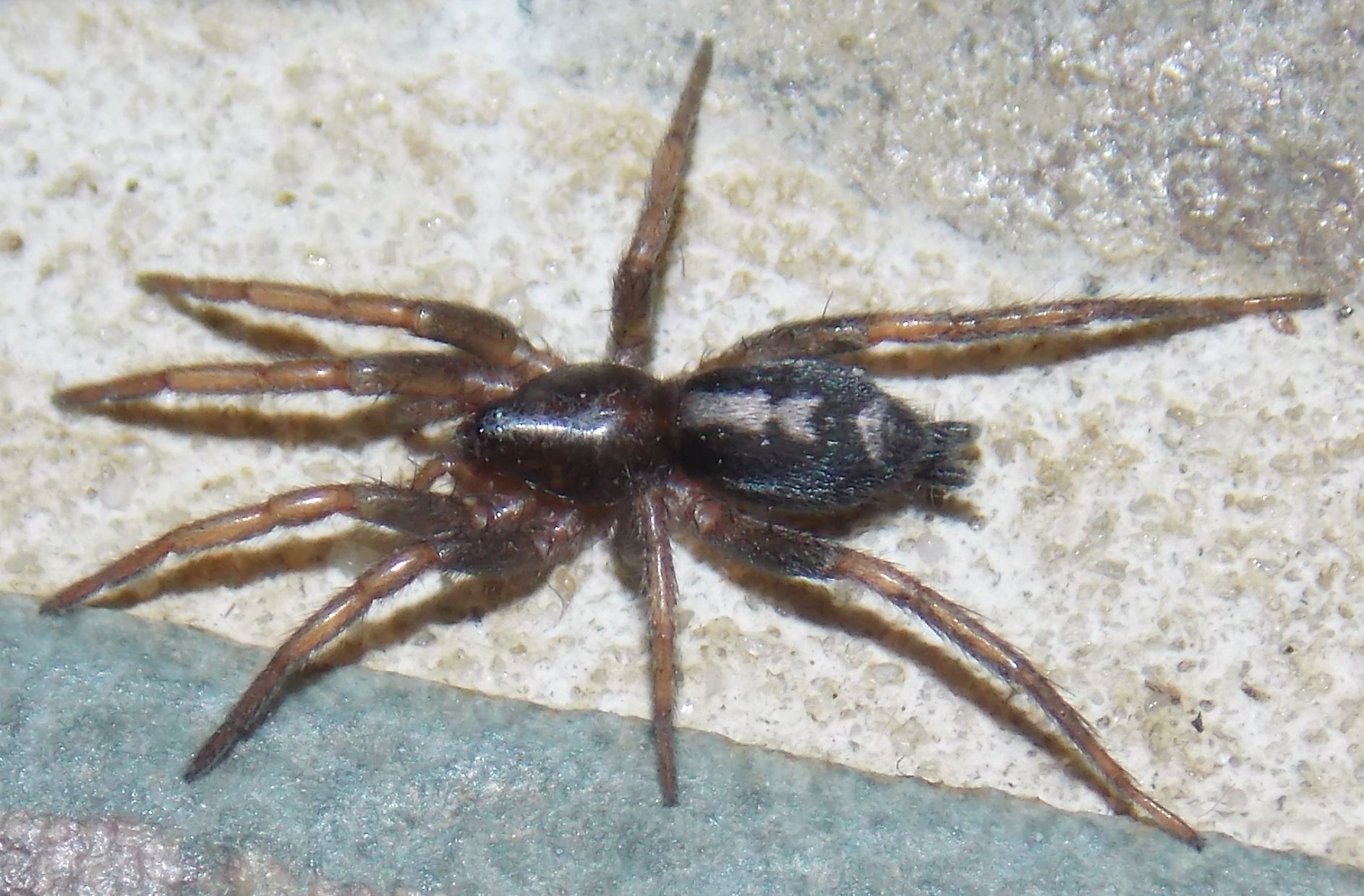
Eastern Parson Spider
(Herpyllus ecclesiasticus)

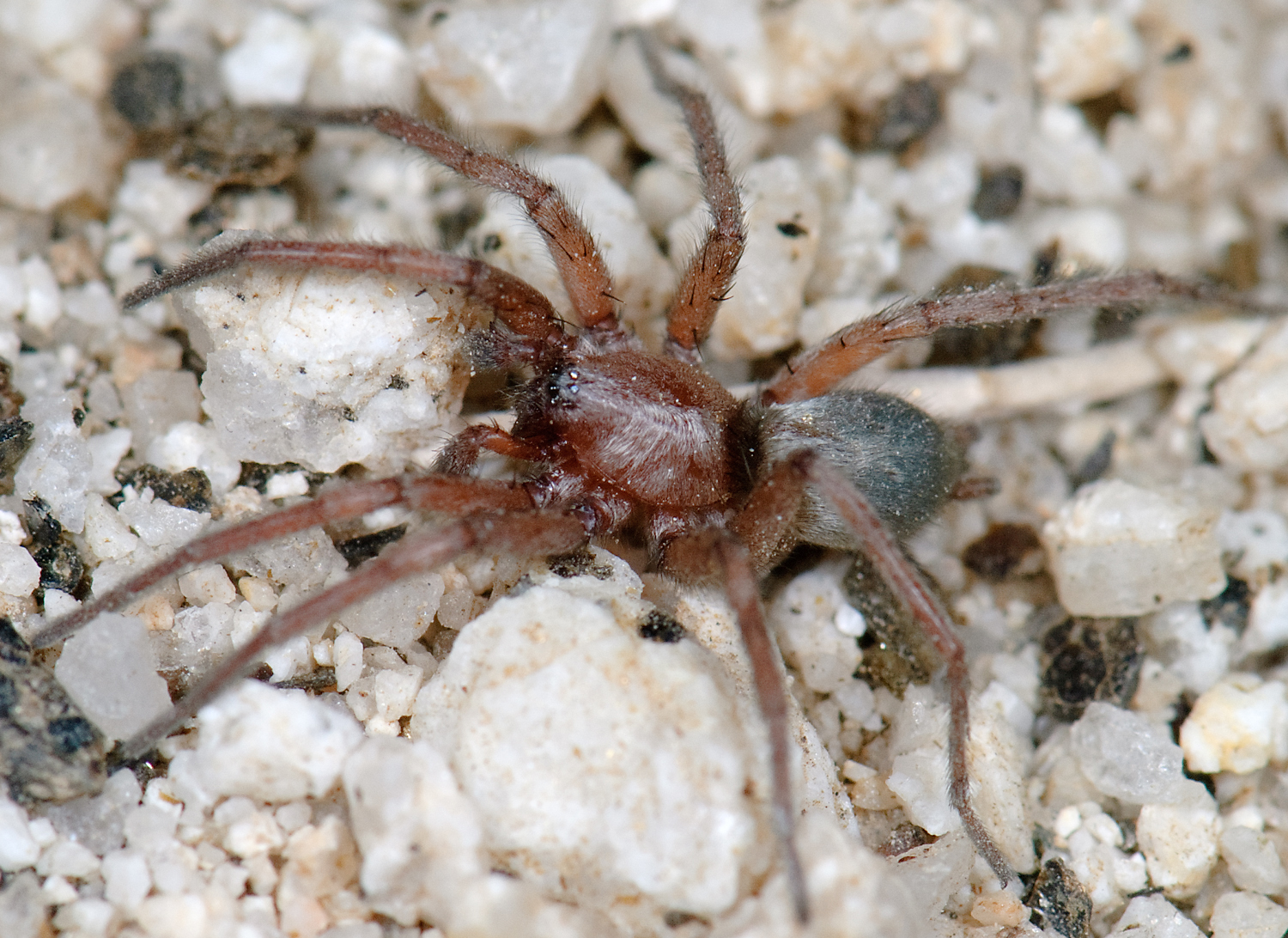
Herpyllus hesperolus

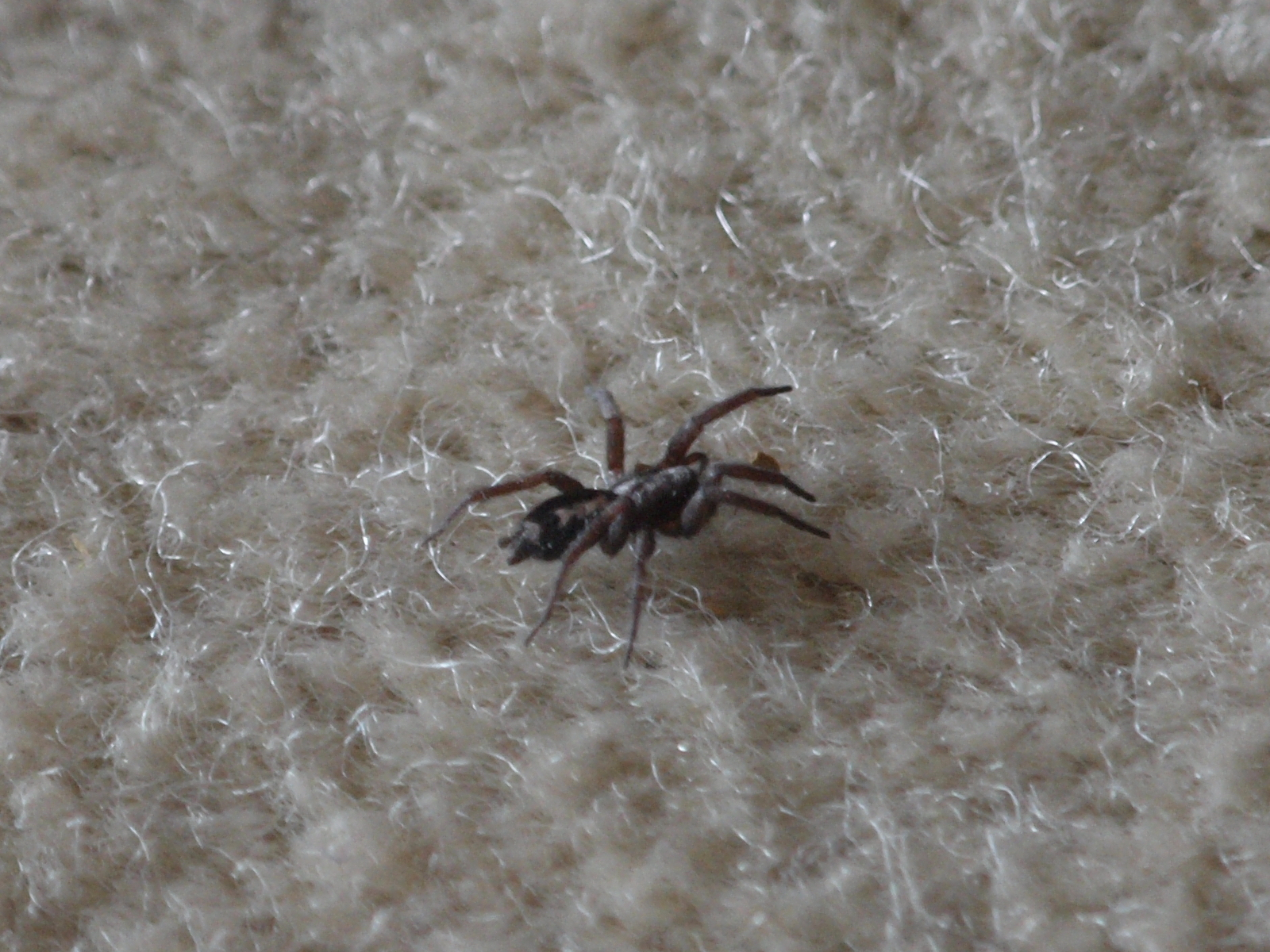
Western Parson Spider
(Herpyllus propinquus)

Herpyllus Hentz, 1832

- Herpyllus australis (Holmberg, 1881) — Argentina
- Herpyllus bensonae Fox, 1938 — Mexico
- Herpyllus brachet Platnick & Shadab, 1977 — Mexico
- Herpyllus bubulcus Chamberlin, 1922 — USA, Mexico
- Herpyllus calcuttaensis Biswas, 1984 — India
- Herpyllus coahuilanus Gertsch & Davis, 1940 — Mexico
- Herpyllus cockerelli (Banks, 1901) — USA, Mexico
- Herpyllus convallis Chamberlin, 1936 — USA, Mexico
- Herpyllus coreanus Paik, 1992 — Korea
- Herpyllus ecclesiasticus Hentz, 1832 (type) — North America
- Herpyllus emertoni Bryant, 1935 — USA
- Herpyllus excelsus Fox, 1938 — USA, Mexico
- Herpyllus fidelis (O. Pickard-Cambridge, 1898) — Mexico
- Herpyllus frio Platnick & Shadab, 1977 — Mexico
- Herpyllus gertschi Platnick & Shadab, 1977 — USA, Mexico
- Herpyllus giganteus Platnick & Shadab, 1977 — Mexico
- Herpyllus goaensis Tikader, 1982 — India
- Herpyllus hesperolus Chamberlin, 1928 — North America
- Herpyllus iguala Platnick & Shadab, 1977 — Mexico
- Herpyllus lativulvus Denis, 1958 — Afghanistan
- Herpyllus malkini Platnick & Shadab, 1977 — Mexico
- Herpyllus paropanisadensis Denis, 1958 — Afghanistan
- Herpyllus perditus (Banks, 1898) — Mexico
- Herpyllus perote Platnick & Shadab, 1977 — Mexico
- Herpyllus pictus (F. O. Pickard-Cambridge, 1899) — Mexico
- Herpyllus propinquus (Keyserling, 1887) — North America
- Herpyllus proximus Denis, 1958 — Turkmenistan, Afghanistan
- Herpyllus regnans Chamberlin, 1936 — USA
- Herpyllus reservatus Chamberlin, 1936 — USA, Mexico
- Herpyllus scholasticus Chamberlin, 1922 — USA
- Herpyllus schwarzi (Banks, 1901) — USA
- Herpyllus sherus Platnick & Shadab, 1977 — Mexico
- Herpyllus vicinus Denis, 1958 — Afghanistan

=== Heser ===
Heser Tuneva, 2004

- Heser aradensis (Levy, 1998) — Israel
- Heser bernardi (Marinaro, 1967) — Spain, Algeria
- Heser bonneti (Marinaro, 1967) — Algeria
- Heser hierosolymitanus (Levy, 1998) — Israel
- Heser hispanus Senglet, 2012 — Spain
- Heser infumatus (O. Pickard-Cambridge, 1872) — Tanzania, Egypt, Israel
- Heser malefactor Tuneva, 2004 (type) — Kazakhstan
- Heser nilicola (O. Pickard-Cambridge, 1874) — Mediterranean, Canary Is. Introduced to USA, Mexico
- Heser schmitzi (Kulczyński, 1899) — Spain, Madeira, Canary Is. Introduced to USA
- Heser stoevi Deltshev, 2016 — Turkmenistan
- Heser vijayanagara Bosselaers, 2010 — India

=== Hitobia ===
Hitobia Kamura, 1992

- Hitobia asiatica (Bösenberg & Strand, 1906) — Japan
- Hitobia cancellata Yin, Peng, Gong & Kim, 1996 — China
- Hitobia chayuensis Song, Zhu & Zhang, 2004 — China
- Hitobia hirtella Wang & Peng, 2014 — China
- Hitobia makotoi Kamura, 2011 — China, Japan
- Hitobia menglong Song, Zhu & Zhang, 2004 — China
- Hitobia monsta Yin, Peng, Gong & Kim, 1996 — China
- Hitobia procula Sankaran & Sebastian, 2018 — India
- Hitobia shaohai Yin & Bao, 2012 — China
- Hitobia shimen Yin & Bao, 2012 — China
- Hitobia taiwanica Zhang, Zhu & Tso, 2009 — Taiwan
- Hitobia tengchong Wang & Peng, 2014 — China
- Hitobia tenuicincta (Simon, 1909) — Vietnam
- Hitobia unifascigera (Bösenberg & Strand, 1906) (type) — China, Korea, Japan
- Hitobia yaginumai Deeleman-Reinhold, 2001 — Thailand
- Hitobia yasunosukei Kamura, 1992 — China, Okinawa
- Hitobia yunnan Song, Zhu & Zhang, 2004 — China

=== Homoeothele ===
Homoeothele Simon, 1908

- Homoeothele micans Simon, 1908 (type) — Australia (Western Australia)

=== Hongkongia ===
Hongkongia Song & Zhu, 1998

- Hongkongia caeca Deeleman-Reinhold, 2001 — Indonesia (Moluccas)
- Hongkongia reptrix Deeleman-Reinhold, 2001 — Indonesia (Java, Borneo, Bali)
- Hongkongia songi Zhang, Zhu & Tso, 2009 — Taiwan
- Hongkongia wuae Song & Zhu, 1998 (type) — China, Hong Kong, Indonesia (Sulawesi)

=== Hotwheels ===
Hotwheels Liu & Zhang, 2024

- Hotwheels sisyphus Liu & Zhang, 2024 – China

=== Hypodrassodes ===
Hypodrassodes Dalmas, 1919

- Hypodrassodes apicus Forster, 1979 — New Zealand
- Hypodrassodes asbolodes (Rainbow & Pulleine, 1920) — Australia (Lord Howe Is.)
- Hypodrassodes canacus Berland, 1924 — New Caledonia
- Hypodrassodes cockerelli Berland, 1932 — New Caledonia
- Hypodrassodes courti Forster, 1979 — New Zealand
- Hypodrassodes crassus Forster, 1979 — New Zealand
- Hypodrassodes dalmasi Forster, 1979 — New Zealand
- Hypodrassodes ignambensis Berland, 1924 — New Caledonia
- Hypodrassodes insulanus Forster, 1979 — New Zealand
- Hypodrassodes isopus Forster, 1979 — New Zealand
- Hypodrassodes maoricus (Dalmas, 1917) (type) — New Zealand

== I ==
=== Ibala ===
Ibala Fitzpatrick, 2009

- Ibala arcus (Tucker, 1923) (type) — Zimbabwe, South Africa
- Ibala bilinearis (Tucker, 1923) — South Africa
- Ibala bulawayensis (Tucker, 1923) — Zimbabwe, South Africa
- Ibala declani Fitzpatrick, 2009 — Zimbabwe
- Ibala gonono Fitzpatrick, 2009 — Zimbabwe
- Ibala hessei (Lawrence, 1928) — Namibia
- Ibala isikela Fitzpatrick, 2009 — Zambia, Zimbabwe
- Ibala kaokoensis (Lawrence, 1928) — Namibia
- Ibala kevini Fitzpatrick, 2009 — Zimbabwe
- Ibala kylae Fitzpatrick, 2009 — Zimbabwe
- Ibala lapidaria (Lawrence, 1928) — Namibia
- Ibala mabalauta Fitzpatrick, 2009 — Zimbabwe
- Ibala minshullae Fitzpatrick, 2009 — Zimbabwe
- Ibala okorosave Fitzpatrick, 2009 — Namibia
- Ibala omuramba (Lawrence, 1927) — Namibia
- Ibala quadrativulva (Lawrence, 1927) — Namibia
- Ibala robinsoni Fitzpatrick, 2009 — Zimbabwe, Botswana

=== Intruda ===
Intruda Forster, 1979

- Intruda signata (Hogg, 1900) (type) — Australia (Victoria), New Zealand

=== Iranotricha ===
Iranotricha Zamani & Marusik, 2018

- Iranotricha lutensis Zamani & Marusik, 2018 (type) — Iran

== K ==
=== Kaitawa ===
Kaitawa

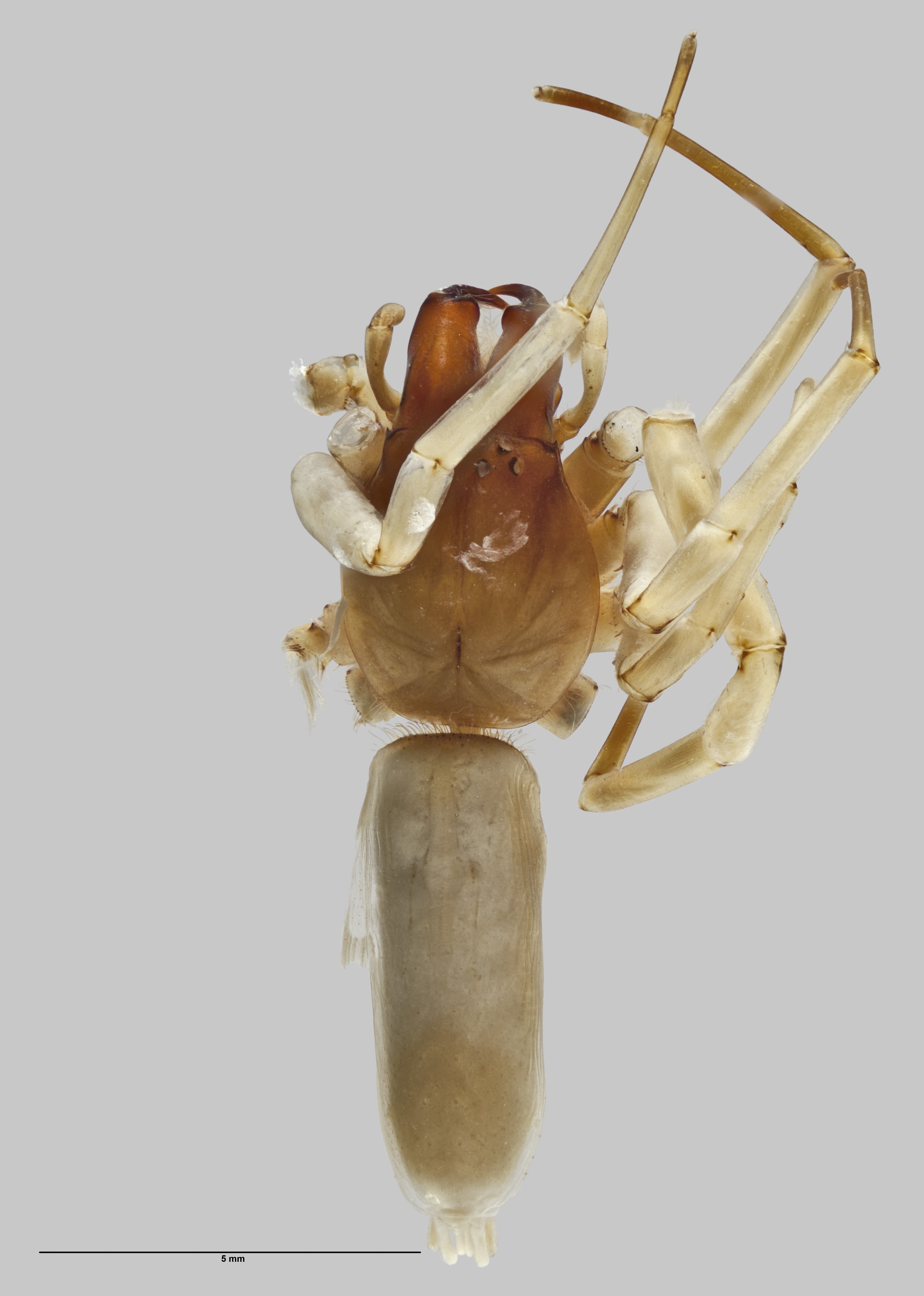
Kaitawa insulare

Kaitawa Forster, 1979

- Kaitawa insulare (Marples, 1956) (type) — New Zealand

=== Katumbea ===
Katumbea Cooke, 1964

- Katumbea oxoniensis Cooke, 1964 (type) — Tanzania

=== Kishidaia ===
Kishidaia Yaginuma, 1960

- Kishidaia albimaculata (Saito, 1934) (type) — Russia (Far East), China, Japan
- Kishidaia conspicua (L. Koch, 1866) — Europe, Caucasus, Russia (Europe to Far East), Central Asia, China
  - Kishidaia conspicua concolor (Caporiacco, 1951) — Italy
- Kishidaia coreana (Paik, 1992) — Korea

== L ==
=== Ladissa ===
Ladissa Simon, 1907

- Ladissa africana Simon, 1907 — Sierra Leone
- Ladissa inda (Simon, 1897) (type) — India
- Ladissa latecingulata Simon, 1907 — India
- Ladissa semirufa Simon, 1907 — Benin

=== Laronius ===
Laronius Platnick & Deeleman-Reinhold, 2001

- Laronius erewan Platnick & Deeleman-Reinhold, 2001 (type) — Thailand, Indonesia (Sumatra)

=== Lasophorus ===
Lasophorus Chatzaki, 2018

- Lasophorus zakkak Chatzaki, 2018 — Greece
- Lasophorus zografae Chatzaki, 2018 — Greece

=== Latonigena ===
Latonigena Simon, 1893

- Latonigena auricomis Simon, 1893 (type) — Brazil, Uruguay, Argentina
- Latonigena beni Ott, Rodrigues & Brescovit, 2012 — Bolivia, Brazil
- Latonigena colombo Ott, Rodrigues & Brescovit, 2012 — Brazil
- Latonigena lami Ott, Rodrigues & Brescovit, 2012 — Brazil, Argentina
- Latonigena pampa López Carrión & Grismado, 2014 — Argentina
- Latonigena pittieri López Carrión & Grismado, 2014 — Venezuela
- Latonigena santana Ott, Rodrigues & Brescovit, 2012 — Brazil, Argentina
- Latonigena sapiranga Ott, Rodrigues & Brescovit, 2012 — Brazil
- Latonigena taim Ott, Rodrigues & Brescovit, 2012 — Brazil
- Latonigena turvo Ott, Rodrigues & Brescovit, 2012 — Brazil, Argentina

=== Leptodrassex ===
Leptodrassex Murphy, 2007

- Leptodrassex algericus (Dalmas, 1919) — Algeria, Libya
- Leptodrassex hylaestomachi (Berland, 1934) — Canary Is.
- Leptodrassex memorialis (Spassky, 1940) — Greece, Ukraine, Russia (Europe to Central Asia), Kazakhstan, Pakistan, Mongolia
- Leptodrassex simoni (Dalmas, 1919) (type) — Portugal, Spain, France, Lebanon

=== Leptodrassus ===
Leptodrassus Simon, 1878

- Leptodrassus albidus Simon, 1914 — Azores, Canary Is., Spain to Greece (Crete), Turkey, Israel
- Leptodrassus bergensis Tucker, 1923 — South Africa
- Leptodrassus croaticus Dalmas, 1919 — Croatia
- Leptodrassus diomedeus Caporiacco, 1951 — Italy
- Leptodrassus femineus (Simon, 1873) (type) — Portugal to Crete, Israel
- Leptodrassus fragilis Dalmas, 1919 — Algeria, Libya
- Leptodrassus incertus Banks, 1898 — Mexico
- Leptodrassus licentiosus Dalmas, 1919 — South Africa
- Leptodrassus punicus Dalmas, 1919 — Tunisia
- Leptodrassus strandi Caporiacco, 1947 — Ethiopia
- Leptodrassus tropicus Dalmas, 1919 — Sierra Leone

=== Leptopilos ===
Leptopilos Levy, 2009

- Leptopilos hadjissaranti (Chatzaki, 2002) — Greece (Crete)
- Leptopilos lakhish Levy, 2009 — Israel
- Leptopilos levantinus Levy, 2009 — Greece (Crete), Israel
- Leptopilos manolisi (Chatzaki, 2002) — Greece (Crete), Israel
- Leptopilos pupa (Dalmas, 1919) — Egypt
- Leptopilos tenerrimus (O. Pickard-Cambridge, 1872) (type) — Libya, Israel

=== Litopyllus ===
Litopyllus Chamberlin, 1922

- Litopyllus cubanus (Bryant, 1940) — USA, Bahama Is., Cuba
- Litopyllus realisticus (Chamberlin, 1924) — Mexico
- Litopyllus temporarius Chamberlin, 1922 (type) — USA

=== Lygromma ===
Lygromma Simon, 1893

- Lygromma anops Peck & Shear, 1987 — Ecuador (Galapagos Is.)
- Lygromma chamberlini Gertsch, 1941 — Panama, Colombia, Cuba, Hispaniola
- Lygromma domingo Platnick & Shadab, 1981 — Ecuador
- Lygromma dybasi Platnick & Shadab, 1976 — Costa Rica, Panama
- Lygromma gasnieri Brescovit & Höfer, 1993 — Brazil
- Lygromma gertschi Platnick & Shadab, 1976 — Jamaica
- Lygromma huberti Platnick & Shadab, 1976 — Venezuela, Brazil
- Lygromma kochalkai Platnick & Shadab, 1976 — Colombia
- Lygromma peckorum Platnick & Shadab, 1976 — Colombia
- Lygromma peruvianum Platnick & Shadab, 1976 — Peru
- Lygromma quindio Platnick & Shadab, 1976 — Colombia
- Lygromma senoculatum Simon, 1893 (type) — Venezuela
- Lygromma simoni (Berland, 1913) — Ecuador
- Lygromma taruma Brescovit & Bonaldo, 1998 — Brazil
- Lygromma tuxtla Platnick, 1978 — Mexico
- Lygromma valencianum Simon, 1893 — Venezuela
- Lygromma volcan Platnick & Shadab, 1981 — Panama
- Lygromma wygodzinskyi Platnick, 1978 — Colombia
- Lygromma ybyguara Rheims & Brescovit, 2004 — Brazil

=== Lygrommatoides ===
Lygrommatoides Strand, 1918

- Lygrommatoides problematica Strand, 1918 (type) — Japan

== M ==
=== Macarophaeus ===
Macarophaeus Wunderlich, 2011

- Macarophaeus cultior (Kulczyński, 1899) — Canary Is., Madeira
- Macarophaeus insignis Wunderlich, 2011 — Canary Is.
- Macarophaeus varius (Simon, 1893) (type) — Canary Is.

=== Marjanus ===
Marjanus Chatzaki, 2018

- Marjanus platnicki (Zhang, Song & Zhu, 2001) (type) — Greece, Turkey, China

=== Matua ===
Matua Forster, 1979

- Matua festiva Forster, 1979 — New Zealand
- Matua valida Forster, 1979 (type) — New Zealand

=== Megamyrmaekion ===
Megamyrmaekion Reuss, 1834

- Megamyrmaekion algericum Simon, 1885 — Algeria, Tunisia
- Megamyrmaekion ashae Tikader & Gajbe, 1977 — India
- Megamyrmaekion austrinum Simon, 1908 — Australia (Western Australia)
- Megamyrmaekion caudatum Reuss, 1834 (type) — Tunisia, Libya, Egypt, Israel, Iran
- Megamyrmaekion hula Levy, 2009 — Israel
- Megamyrmaekion jodhpurense Gajbe, 1993 — India
- Megamyrmaekion kajalae Biswas & Biswas, 1992 — India
- Megamyrmaekion magshimim Levy, 2009 — Israel
- Megamyrmaekion nairobii Berland, 1920 — East Africa
- Megamyrmaekion schreineri Tucker, 1923 — South Africa
- Megamyrmaekion transvaalense Tucker, 1923 — South Africa
- Megamyrmaekion velox Simon, 1887 — South Africa
- Megamyrmaekion vulpinum (O. Pickard-Cambridge, 1874) — Niger, Egypt

=== Micaria ===
Micaria

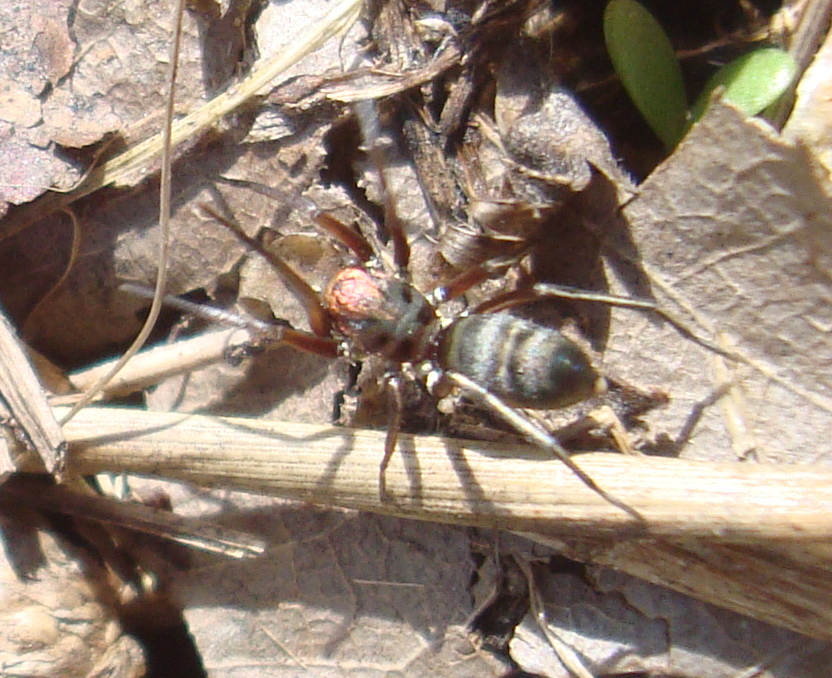
Micaria fulgens

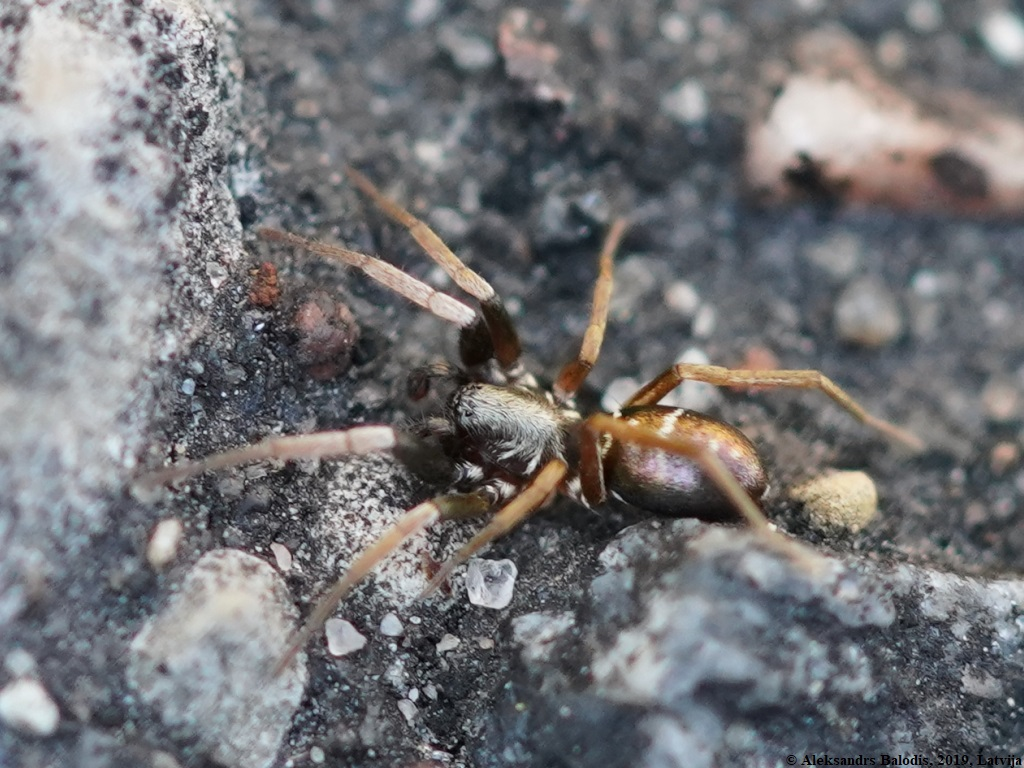
Glossy ant spider
(Micaria pulicaria)

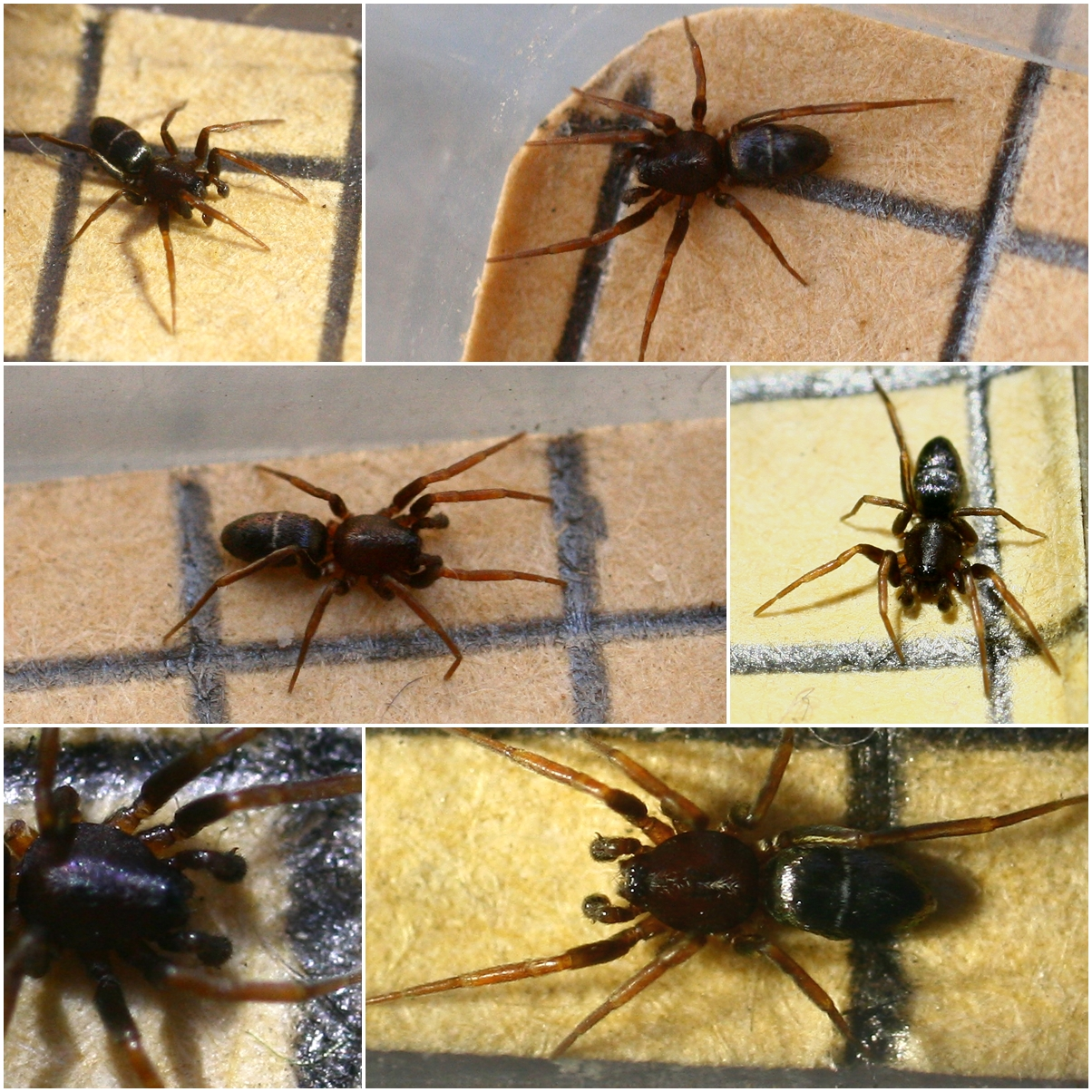
Micaria subopaca

Micaria Westring, 1851

- Micaria aborigenica Mikhailov, 1988 — Russia (northeastern Siberia)
- Micaria aciculata Simon, 1895 — Russia (south Siberia)
- Micaria aenea Thorell, 1871 — North America, Europe, Russia (Europe to Far East), Kazakhstan
- Micaria albofasciata Hu, 2001 — China
- Micaria albovittata (Lucas, 1846) — Europe, Turkey, Caucasus, Russia (Europe to Central Asia), Iran, Turkmenistan, China
- Micaria alpina L. Koch, 1872 — USA (Alaska), Canada, Europe, Russia (Europe to Far East), Japan
- Micaria alxa Tang, Urita, Song & Zhao, 1997 — China
- Micaria beaufortia (Tucker, 1923) — South Africa
- Micaria belezma Bosmans, 2000 — Algeria
- Micaria blicki Kovblyuk & Nadolny, 2008 — Ukraine
- Micaria bonneti Schenkel, 1963 — Mongolia, China
- Micaria bosmansi Kovblyuk & Nadolny, 2008 — Ukraine, Russia (Europe)
- Micaria braendegaardi Denis, 1958 — Afghanistan
- Micaria brignolii (Bosmans & Blick, 2000) — Portugal, France
- Micaria browni Barnes, 1953 — USA
- Micaria camargo Platnick & Shadab, 1988 — Mexico
- Micaria capistrano Platnick & Shadab, 1988 — USA, Mexico
- Micaria charitonovi Mikhailov & Ponomarev, 2008 — Kazakhstan
- Micaria chrysis (Simon, 1910) — South Africa
- Micaria cimarron Platnick & Shadab, 1988 — USA
- Micaria coarctata (Lucas, 1846) — Mediterranean, Eastern Europe, Caucasus, Russia (Europe to Far East), Kazakhstan, Central Asia
- Micaria coloradensis Banks, 1896 — USA, Canada
- Micaria connexa O. Pickard-Cambridge, 1885 — China (Yarkand)
- Micaria constricta Emerton, 1894 — North America, Svalbard, Russia (Northern Europe to middle Siberia)
- Micaria corvina Simon, 1878 — Algeria, Tunisia, Israel
- Micaria croesia L. Koch, 1873 — Australia (New South Wales)
- Micaria cyrnea Brignoli, 1983 — France (Corsica), Italy, Greece
- Micaria delicatula Bryant, 1941 — USA
- Micaria deserticola Gertsch, 1933 — USA, Mexico
- Micaria dives (Lucas, 1846) — Europe, Turkey, Israel, Caucasus, Russia (Europe to Far East), Central Asia, India, China, Korea, Japan
  - Micaria dives concolor (Caporiacco, 1935) — Karakorum
- Micaria donensis Ponomarev & Tsvetkov, 2006 — Russia (Europe)
- Micaria elizabethae Gertsch, 1942 — USA, Canada
- Micaria emertoni Gertsch, 1935 — North America
- Micaria faltana Bhattacharya, 1935 — India
- Micaria formicaria (Sundevall, 1831) — Europe, Turkey, Caucasus, Russia (Europe to Far East), Kazakhstan, China
- Micaria foxi Gertsch, 1933 — USA, Canada
- Micaria fulgens (Walckenaer, 1802) (type) — Europe, Caucasus, Russia (Europe to south Siberia), Central Asia, China
- Micaria funerea Simon, 1878 — Spain, France (Corsica), Bulgaria, Russia (Caucasus)
- Micaria galilaea Levy, 2009 — Israel
- Micaria gertschi Barrows & Ivie, 1942 — USA, Canada
- Micaria gomerae Strand, 1911 — Canary Is.
- Micaria gosiuta Gertsch, 1942 — USA, Mexico
- Micaria gulliae Tuneva & Esyunin, 2003 — Russia (Europe), Kazakhstan
- Micaria guttigera Simon, 1878 — Portugal, Spain, France
- Micaria guttulata (C. L. Koch, 1839) — Europe, Russia (Europe to Far East), Kazakhstan, Kyrgyzstan
- Micaria icenoglei Platnick & Shadab, 1988 — USA
- Micaria idana Platnick & Shadab, 1988 — USA, Canada
- Micaria ignea (O. Pickard-Cambridge, 1872) — Canary Is., Algeria, Spain, Greece (Crete), Cyprus, Egypt, Yemen, Israel, Syria, Iran, Central Asia
- Micaria imperiosa Gertsch, 1935 — USA, Mexico
- Micaria inornata L. Koch, 1873 — Australia
- Micaria japonica Hayashi, 1985 — Russia (Far East), Korea, Japan
- Micaria jeanae Gertsch, 1942 — USA, Mexico
- Micaria jinlin Song, Zhu & Zhang, 2004 — China
- Micaria kopetdaghensis Mikhailov, 1986 — Caucasus to Central Asia
- Micaria langtry Platnick & Shadab, 1988 — USA
- Micaria lassena Platnick & Shadab, 1988 — USA
- Micaria laticeps Emerton, 1909 — USA, Canada
- Micaria lenzi Bösenberg, 1899 — Europe, Caucasus, Russia (Europe to South and northeastern Siberia), Central Asia, China
- Micaria lindbergi Roewer, 1962 — Afghanistan
- Micaria logunovi Zhang, Song & Zhu, 2001 — China
- Micaria longipes Emerton, 1890 — North America
- Micaria longispina Emerton, 1911 — USA, Canada
- Micaria marchesii (Caporiacco, 1936) — Libya
- Micaria marusiki Zhang, Song & Zhu, 2001 — China
- Micaria medica Platnick & Shadab, 1988 — USA, Canada
- Micaria mexicana Platnick & Shadab, 1988 — Mexico
- Micaria mongunica Danilov, 1997 — Russia (south Siberia)
- Micaria mormon Gertsch, 1935 — North America
- Micaria nanella Gertsch, 1935 — USA, Mexico
- Micaria nivosa L. Koch, 1866 — Europe, Russia (Europe to south Siberia), Kazakhstan
- Micaria nye Platnick & Shadab, 1988 — USA, Mexico
- Micaria otero Platnick & Shadab, 1988 — USA
- Micaria pallens Denis, 1958 — Afghanistan
- Micaria pallida O. Pickard-Cambridge, 1885 — Tajikistan
- Micaria palliditarsa Banks, 1896 — USA, Mexico
- Micaria pallipes (Lucas, 1846) — Madeira, Mediterranean to Central Asia
- Micaria palma Platnick & Shadab, 1988 — USA
- Micaria palmgreni Wunderlich, 1980 — Finland
- Micaria paralbofasciata Song, Zhu & Zhang, 2004 — China
- Micaria pasadena Platnick & Shadab, 1988 — USA, Mexico
- Micaria porta Platnick & Shadab, 1988 — USA, Mexico
- Micaria pulcherrima Caporiacco, 1935 — India, Pakistan, Russia (south Siberia), China
  - Micaria pulcherrima flava Caporiacco, 1935 — Karakorum
- Micaria pulicaria (Sundevall, 1831) — North America, Europe, Turkey, Caucasus, Russia (Europe to Far East), Central Asia, China, Japan
- Micaria punctata Banks, 1896 — USA
- Micaria riggsi Gertsch, 1942 — USA, Canada
- Micaria rossica Thorell, 1875 — North America, Europe, Turkey, Caucasus, Russia (Europe to Far East), Central Asia, Mongolia, China
- Micaria seminola Gertsch, 1942 — USA
- Micaria seymuria Tuneva, 2004 — Kazakhstan
- Micaria silesiaca L. Koch, 1875 — Europe, Caucasus, Russia (Europe to south Siberia)
- Micaria siniloana Barrion & Litsinger, 1995 — Philippines
- Micaria sociabilis Kulczyński, 1897 — Europe, Azerbaijan
- Micaria subopaca Westring, 1861 — Europe, Russia (Europe to south Siberia, Kamchatka)
- Micaria tarabaevi Mikhailov, 1988 — Kazakhstan
- Micaria tersissima Simon, 1910 — South Africa
- Micaria triangulosa Gertsch, 1935 — USA
- Micaria triguttata Simon, 1884 — Spain, France, Algeria
- Micaria tripunctata Holm, 1978 — USA (Alaska), Canada, Northern Europe, Russia (Europe to Far East)
- Micaria tuvensis Danilov, 1993 — Russia (Central Asia, south Siberia), Kazakhstan, China
- Micaria utahna Gertsch, 1933 — USA
- Micaria vinnula Gertsch & Davis, 1936 — USA
- Micaria violens Oliger, 1983 — Russia (Far East)
- Micaria xiningensis Hu, 2001 — China
- Micaria yeniseica Marusik & Koponen, 2002 — Russia (middle Siberia)
- Micaria yushuensis Hu, 2001 — China
- Micaria zonsteini (Mikhailov, 2016) — Azerbaijan, Kyrgyzstan

=== Microdrassus ===
Microdrassus Dalmas, 1919

- Microdrassus inaudax (Simon, 1898) (type) — Seychelles

=== Microsa ===
Microsa Platnick & Shadab, 1977

- Microsa chickeringi Platnick & Shadab, 1977 (type) — Virgin Is.
- Microsa cubitas Alayón & Platnick, 1993 — Cuba
- Microsa gertschi Platnick, 1978 — Bahama Is.

=== Micythus ===
Micythus Thorell, 1897

- Micythus anopsis Deeleman-Reinhold, 2001 — Thailand
- Micythus pictus Thorell, 1897 (type) — Myanmar, Indonesia (Borneo)
- Micythus rangunensis (Thorell, 1895) — Myanmar, Indonesia (Sumatra, Borneo)

=== Minosia ===
Minosia Dalmas, 1921

- Minosia assimilis Caporiacco, 1941 — Ethiopia, Uganda
- Minosia berlandi Lessert, 1929 — Congo
- Minosia bicalcarata (Simon, 1882) — Yemen
- Minosia clypeolaria (Simon, 1907) — Guinea-Bissau
- Minosia eburneensis Jézéquel, 1965 — Ivory Coast
- Minosia irrugata (Simon, 1907) — Guinea-Bissau
- Minosia karakumensis (Spassky, 1939) — Turkmenistan
- Minosia lynx (Simon, 1886) — Senegal
- Minosia pharao Dalmas, 1921 — Egypt, Israel
  - Minosia pharao occidentalis Dalmas, 1921 — Algeria
- Minosia santschii Dalmas, 1921 — Tunisia, Libya
- Minosia senegaliensis Dalmas, 1921 — Senegal
- Minosia simeonica Levy, 1995 — Israel, Iran
- Minosia spinosissima (Simon, 1878) (type) — Spain, France, Israel

=== Minosiella ===
Minosiella Dalmas, 1921

- Minosiella intermedia Denis, 1958 — Central Asia, Afghanistan, Iran
- Minosiella mediocris Dalmas, 1921 (type) — Tunisia, Algeria, Egypt, Israel
- Minosiella pallida (L. Koch, 1875) — Somalia, Yemen
- Minosiella perimensis Dalmas, 1921 — Yemen
- Minosiella pharia Dalmas, 1921 — Libya, Egypt, Israel
- Minosiella spinigera (Simon, 1882) — Yemen

=== Molycria ===
Molycria Simon, 1887

- Molycria amphi Platnick & Baehr, 2006 — Australia (Queensland)
- Molycria broadwater Platnick & Baehr, 2006 — Australia (Queensland, New South Wales)
- Molycria bulburin Platnick & Baehr, 2006 — Australia (Queensland)
- Molycria bundjalung Platnick & Baehr, 2006 — Australia (New South Wales)
- Molycria burwelli Platnick & Baehr, 2006 — Australia (Queensland)
- Molycria canonba Platnick & Baehr, 2006 — Australia (Queensland, New South Wales)
- Molycria cleveland Platnick & Baehr, 2006 — Australia (Queensland)
- Molycria cooki Platnick & Baehr, 2006 — Australia (Queensland)
- Molycria dalby Platnick & Baehr, 2006 — Australia (Queensland, New South Wales)
- Molycria daviesae Platnick & Baehr, 2006 — Australia (Queensland)
- Molycria dawson Platnick & Baehr, 2006 — Australia (Queensland)
- Molycria drummond Platnick & Baehr, 2006 — Australia (Queensland)
- Molycria goanna Platnick & Baehr, 2006 — Australia (Queensland, New South Wales)
- Molycria grayi Platnick & Baehr, 2006 — Australia (Queensland, New South Wales, Lord Howe Is.)
- Molycria isla Platnick & Baehr, 2006 — Australia (Queensland)
- Molycria kaputar Platnick & Baehr, 2006 — Australia (New South Wales)
- Molycria mammosa (O. Pickard-Cambridge, 1874) (type) — Australia (New South Wales, Capital Territory)
- Molycria mcleani Platnick & Baehr, 2006 — Australia (Queensland)
- Molycria milledgei Platnick & Baehr, 2006 — Australia (New South Wales)
- Molycria moffatt Platnick & Baehr, 2006 — Australia (Queensland)
- Molycria monteithi Platnick & Baehr, 2006 — Australia (Queensland)
- Molycria moranbah Platnick & Baehr, 2006 — Australia (Queensland)
- Molycria nipping Platnick & Baehr, 2006 — Australia (Queensland)
- Molycria quadricauda (Simon, 1908) — Southern Australia
- Molycria raveni Platnick & Baehr, 2006 — Australia (Queensland)
- Molycria robert Platnick & Baehr, 2006 — Australia (Queensland)
- Molycria smithae Platnick & Baehr, 2006 — Australia (New South Wales)
- Molycria stanisici Platnick & Baehr, 2006 — Australia (Queensland)
- Molycria taroom Platnick & Baehr, 2006 — Australia (Queensland)
- Molycria thompsoni Platnick & Baehr, 2006 — Australia (Queensland)
- Molycria tooloombah Platnick & Baehr, 2006 — Australia (Queensland)
- Molycria upstart Platnick & Baehr, 2006 — Australia (Queensland)
- Molycria vokes Platnick & Baehr, 2006 — Australia (Western Australia, Northern Territory, South Australia)
- Molycria wallacei Platnick & Baehr, 2006 — Australia (Queensland)
- Molycria wardeni Platnick & Baehr, 2006 — Australia (Queensland)
- Molycria wrightae Platnick & Baehr, 2006 — Australia (Queensland)

=== Montebello ===
Montebello Hogg, 1914

- Montebello tenuis Hogg, 1914 (type) — Australia (Western Australia)

=== Moreno ===
Moreno Mello-Leitão, 1940

- Moreno chacabuco Platnick, Shadab & Sorkin, 2005 — Chile
- Moreno chivato Platnick, Shadab & Sorkin, 2005 — Chile
- Moreno grande Platnick, Shadab & Sorkin, 2005 — Chile
- Moreno morenoi Mello-Leitão, 1940 (type) — Argentina
- Moreno neuquen Platnick, Shadab & Sorkin, 2005 — Argentina
- Moreno ramirezi Platnick, Shadab & Sorkin, 2005 — Argentina

=== Myandra ===
Myandra Simon, 1887

- Myandra bicincta Simon, 1908 — Australia
- Myandra cambridgei Simon, 1887 (type) — Australia
- Myandra myall Platnick & Baehr, 2006 — Australia (Queensland to Tasmania)
- Myandra tinline Platnick & Baehr, 2006 — Southern Australia

== N ==
=== Namundra ===
Namundra Platnick & Bird, 2007

- Namundra brandberg Platnick & Bird, 2007 — Namibia
- Namundra griffinae Platnick & Bird, 2007 — Namibia
- Namundra kleynjansi Platnick & Bird, 2007 — Namibia
- Namundra leechi Platnick & Bird, 2007 — Angola

=== Nauhea ===
Nauhea

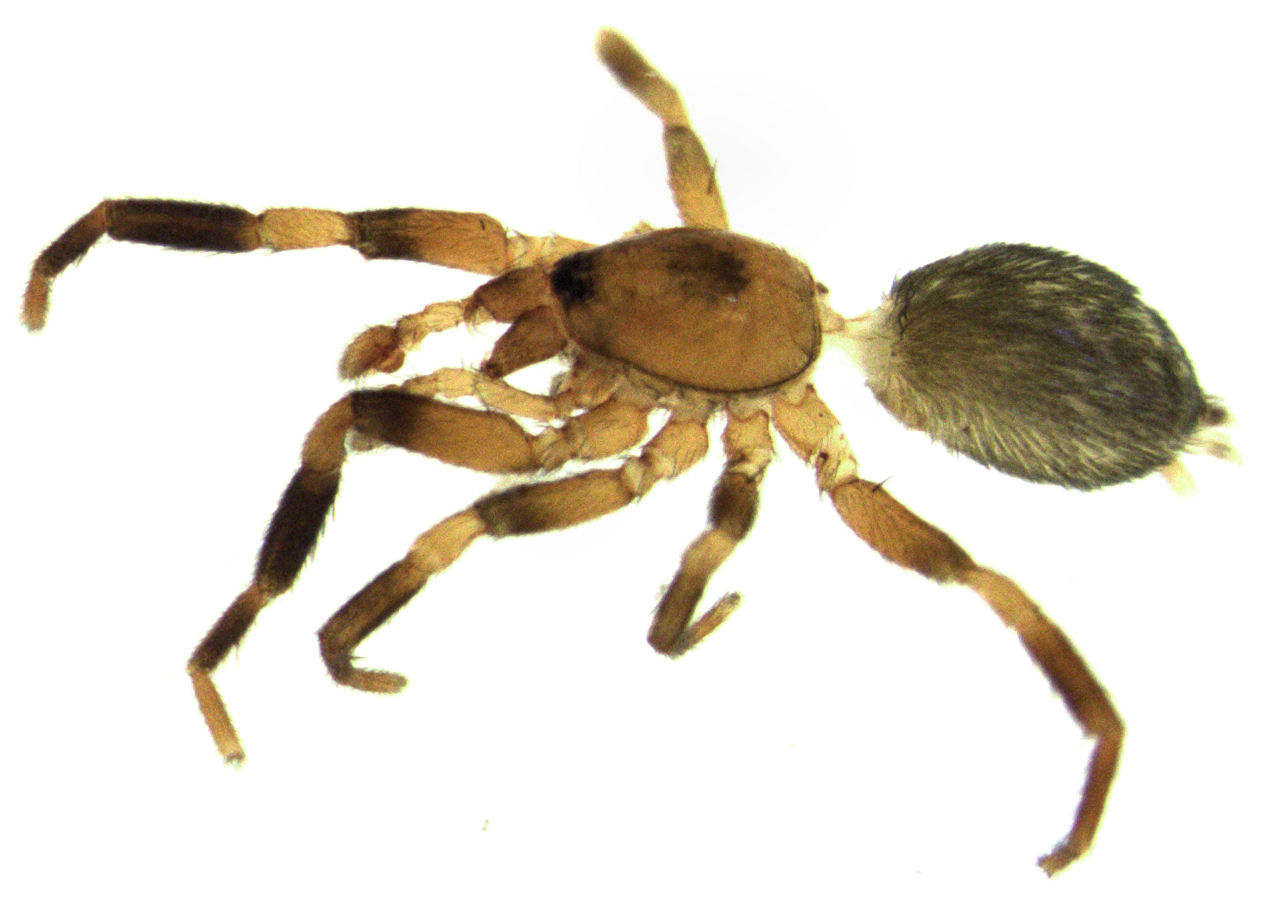
Nauhea tapa

Nauhea Forster, 1979

- Nauhea tapa Forster, 1979 (type) — New Zealand

=== Neodrassex ===
Neodrassex Ott, 2012

- Neodrassex aureus Ott, 2012 (type) — Brazil, Argentina
- Neodrassex cachimbo Ott, 2013 — Brazil
- Neodrassex ibirapuita Ott, 2013 — Brazil
- Neodrassex iguatemi Ott, 2012 — Brazil
- Neodrassex nordeste Ott, 2013 — Brazil

=== Neozimiris ===
Neozimiris Simon, 1903

- Neozimiris chickeringi Platnick & Shadab, 1976 — Panama
- Neozimiris crinis Platnick & Shadab, 1976 — Mexico
- Neozimiris escandoni Müller, 1987 — Colombia
- Neozimiris exuma Platnick & Shadab, 1976 — Bahama Is.
- Neozimiris levii Platnick & Shadab, 1976 — Curaçao
- Neozimiris nuda Platnick & Shadab, 1976 — Puerto Rico
- Neozimiris pinta Platnick & Shadab, 1976 — Ecuador (Galapagos Is.)
- Neozimiris pinzon Platnick & Shadab, 1976 — Ecuador (Galapagos Is.)
- Neozimiris pubescens (Banks, 1898) (type) — USA, Mexico

=== Nodocion ===
Nodocion Chamberlin, 1922

- Nodocion eclecticus Chamberlin, 1924 — North America
- Nodocion floridanus (Banks, 1896) — USA, Mexico
- Nodocion mateonus Chamberlin, 1922 (type) — USA
- Nodocion rufithoracicus Worley, 1928 — USA, Canada
- Nodocion solanensis Tikader & Gajbe, 1977 — India
- Nodocion tikaderi (Gajbe, 1993) — India
- Nodocion utus (Chamberlin, 1936) — USA, Mexico
- Nodocion voluntarius (Chamberlin, 1919) — North America

=== Nomindra ===
Nomindra Platnick & Baehr, 2006

- Nomindra arenaria Platnick & Baehr, 2006 — Australia (Northern Territory)
- Nomindra barlee Platnick & Baehr, 2006 — Australia (Western Australia)
- Nomindra berrimah Platnick & Baehr, 2006 — Australia (Northern Territory)
- Nomindra cocklebiddy Platnick & Baehr, 2006 — Australia (Western Australia)
- Nomindra cooma Platnick & Baehr, 2006 — Australia (Western Australia)
- Nomindra fisheri Platnick & Baehr, 2006 — Australia (Northern Territory)
- Nomindra flavipes (Simon, 1908) — Australia (Western Australia, South Australia)
- Nomindra gregory Platnick & Baehr, 2006 — Australia (Western Australia, Northern Territory)
- Nomindra indulkana Platnick & Baehr, 2006 — Australia (Western Australia, South Australia)
- Nomindra jarrnarm Platnick & Baehr, 2006 — Australia (Western Australia, Northern Territory)
- Nomindra kinchega Platnick & Baehr, 2006 (type) — Australia (South Australia, Queensland to Victoria)
- Nomindra leeuweni Platnick & Baehr, 2006 — Southern Australia
- Nomindra ormiston Platnick & Baehr, 2006 — Australia (Northern Territory, South Australia)
- Nomindra thatch Platnick & Baehr, 2006 — Australia (Queensland)
- Nomindra woodstock Platnick & Baehr, 2006 — Australia (Western Australia)
- Nomindra yeni Platnick & Baehr, 2006 — Australia (Western Australia to Queensland)

=== Nomisia ===
Nomisia

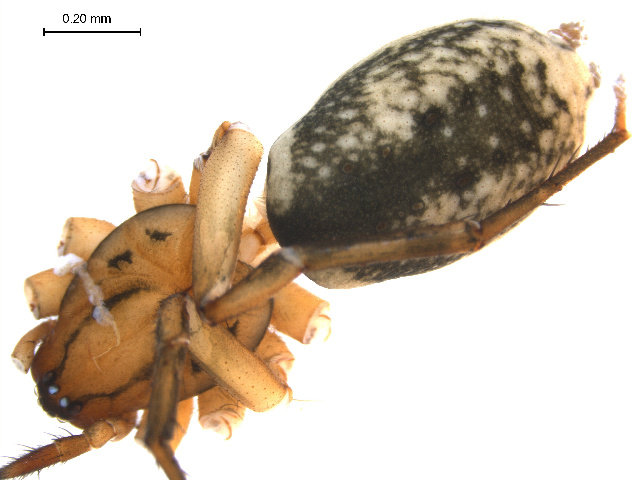
Nomisia aussereri

Nomisia Dalmas, 1921

- Nomisia aussereri (L. Koch, 1872) — Mediterranean, Eastern Europe, Turkey, Middle East, Caucasus, Russia (Europe to south Siberia), Kazakhstan, Central Asia, China
- Nomisia australis Dalmas, 1921 — South Africa
- Nomisia castanea Dalmas, 1921 — Algeria, Tunisia, Libya
- Nomisia celerrima (Simon, 1914) — Spain, France
- Nomisia chordivulvata (Strand, 1906) — Ethiopia, Somalia
- Nomisia conigera (Spassky, 1941) — Turkey, Caucasus, Kazakhstan, Central Asia
- Nomisia dalmasi Lessert, 1929 — Congo
- Nomisia excerpta (O. Pickard-Cambridge, 1872) — Canary Is. to Middle East
- Nomisia exornata (C. L. Koch, 1839) (type) — Europe to Central Asia
- Nomisia flavimana Denis, 1937 — Algeria
- Nomisia fortis Dalmas, 1921 — Canary Is.
- Nomisia frenata (Purcell, 1908) — South Africa
- Nomisia gomerensis Wunderlich, 2011 — Canary Is.
- Nomisia graciliembolus Wunderlich, 2011 — Canary Is.
- Nomisia harpax (O. Pickard-Cambridge, 1874) — India
- Nomisia kabuliana Roewer, 1961 — Afghanistan
- Nomisia levyi Chatzaki, 2010 — Greece
- Nomisia molendinaria (L. Koch, 1866) — Croatia, Georgia
- Nomisia monardi Lessert, 1933 — Angola
- Nomisia montenegrina Giltay, 1932 — Montenegro
- Nomisia musiva (Simon, 1889) — Canary Is.
- Nomisia negebensis Levy, 1995 — Turkey, Israel, Iran
- Nomisia notia Dalmas, 1921 — South Africa
- Nomisia orientalis Dalmas, 1921 — Turkey
- Nomisia palaestina (O. Pickard-Cambridge, 1872) — Greece, Turkey, Syria, Israel
- Nomisia peloponnesiaca Chatzaki, 2010 — Greece
- Nomisia perpusilla Dalmas, 1921 — Spain
- Nomisia poecilipes Caporiacco, 1939 — Ethiopia
- Nomisia punctata (Kulczyński, 1901) — Ethiopia
- Nomisia recepta (Pavesi, 1880) — Tunisia, Algeria, France (mainland, Corsica), Italy (mainland, Sicily), Malta, Cyprus
- Nomisia ripariensis (O. Pickard-Cambridge, 1872) — Bulgaria, Greece, Crete, Turkey to Azerbaijan
- Nomisia satulla (Simon, 1909) — Ethiopia
- Nomisia scioana (Pavesi, 1883) — Ethiopia
- Nomisia simplex (Kulczyński, 1901) — Ethiopia
- Nomisia tingitana Dalmas, 1921 — Morocco
- Nomisia transvaalica Dalmas, 1921 — South Africa
- Nomisia tubula (Tucker, 1923) — Angola, South Africa
- Nomisia uncinata Jézéquel, 1965 — Ivory Coast
- Nomisia varia (Tucker, 1923) — South Africa

=== Nopyllus ===
Nopyllus Ott, 2014

- Nopyllus isabelae (Brescovit & Lise, 1993) (type) — Brazil
- Nopyllus vicente Ott, 2014 — Brazil

=== Notiodrassus ===
Notiodrassus Bryant, 1935

- Notiodrassus distinctus Bryant, 1935 (type) — New Zealand
- Notiodrassus fiordensis Forster, 1979 — New Zealand

== O ==
=== Odontodrassus ===
Odontodrassus Jézéquel, 1965

- Odontodrassus aphanes (Thorell, 1897) — Seychelles, Myanmar to Japan, New Caledonia, French Polynesia. Introduced to Jamaica
- Odontodrassus aravaensis Levy, 1999 — Israel, Egypt
- Odontodrassus bicolor Jézéquel, 1965 — Ivory Coast
- Odontodrassus hondoensis (Saito, 1939) — Russia (Far East), China, Korea, Japan
- Odontodrassus mundulus (O. Pickard-Cambridge, 1872) — Tunisia to Israel, Karakorum
- Odontodrassus muralis Deeleman-Reinhold, 2001 — Thailand, China, Indonesia (Sulawesi, Lombok)
- Odontodrassus nigritibialis Jézéquel, 1965 (type) — Ivory Coast
- Odontodrassus yunnanensis (Schenkel, 1963) — China

=== Oltacloea ===
Oltacloea Mello-Leitão, 1940

- Oltacloea beltraoae Brescovit & Ramos, 2003 — Brazil
- Oltacloea mutilata Mello-Leitão, 1940 (type) — Argentina
- Oltacloea ribaslangei Bonaldo & Brescovit, 1997 — Brazil

=== Orodrassus ===
Orodrassus Chamberlin, 1922

- Orodrassus assimilis (Banks, 1895) — USA
- Orodrassus canadensis Platnick & Shadab, 1975 — USA, Canada
- Orodrassus coloradensis (Emerton, 1877) (type) — USA, Canada

== P ==
=== Parabonna ===
Parabonna Mello-Leitão, 1947

- Parabonna goffergei Mello-Leitão, 1947 (type) — Brazil

=== Paracymbiomma ===
Paracymbiomma Rodrigues, Cizauskas & Rheims, 2018

- Paracymbiomma angelim Rodrigues, Cizauskas & Rheims, 2018 (type) — Brazil
- Paracymbiomma bocaina Rodrigues, Cizauskas & Rheims, 2018 — Brazil
- Paracymbiomma caecus Rodrigues, Cizauskas & Rheims, 2018 — Brazil
- Paracymbiomma carajas Rodrigues, Cizauskas & Rheims, 2018 — Brazil
- Paracymbiomma doisirmaos Rodrigues, Cizauskas & Rheims, 2018 — Brazil
- Paracymbiomma pauferrense Rodrigues, Cizauskas & Rheims, 2018 — Brazil

=== Parasyrisca ===
Parasyrisca Schenkel, 1963

- Parasyrisca alai Ovtsharenko, Platnick & Marusik, 1995 — Kyrgyzstan, Pakistan
- Parasyrisca alexeevi Ovtsharenko, Platnick & Marusik, 1995 — Russia (Caucasus)
- Parasyrisca altaica Ovtsharenko, Platnick & Marusik, 1995 — Kazakhstan
- Parasyrisca andarbag Ovtsharenko, Platnick & Marusik, 1995 — Tajikistan
- Parasyrisca andreevae Ovtsharenko, Platnick & Marusik, 1995 — Tajikistan
- Parasyrisca anzobica Ovtsharenko, Platnick & Marusik, 1995 — Tajikistan
- Parasyrisca arrabonica Szinetár & Eichardt, 2009 — Hungary
- Parasyrisca asiatica Ovtsharenko, Platnick & Marusik, 1995 — Russia (south Siberia), Mongolia
- Parasyrisca balcarica Ovtsharenko, Platnick & Marusik, 1995 — Russia (Caucasus)
- Parasyrisca belengish Ovtsharenko, Platnick & Marusik, 1995 — Russia (south Siberia)
- Parasyrisca belukha Ovtsharenko, Platnick & Marusik, 1995 — Russia (south Siberia)
- Parasyrisca birikchul Ovtsharenko, Platnick & Marusik, 1995 — Russia (south Siberia)
- Parasyrisca breviceps (Kroneberg, 1875) — Tajikistan
- Parasyrisca bucklei Marusik & Fomichev, 2010 — Russia (south Siberia)
- Parasyrisca caucasica Ovtsharenko, Platnick & Marusik, 1995 — Russia (Caucasus)
- Parasyrisca chikatunovi Ovtsharenko, Platnick & Marusik, 1995 — Tajikistan
- Parasyrisca gissarika Ovtsharenko, Platnick & Marusik, 1995 — Tajikistan
- Parasyrisca golyakovi Marusik & Fomichev, 2016 — Russia (south Siberia)
- Parasyrisca guzeripli Ovtsharenko, Platnick & Marusik, 1995 — Russia (Caucasus)
- Parasyrisca heimeri Ovtsharenko, Platnick & Marusik, 1995 — Mongolia
- Parasyrisca helanshan Tang & Zhao, 1998 — China
- Parasyrisca hippai Ovtsharenko, Platnick & Marusik, 1995 — Russia (south Siberia)
- Parasyrisca holmi Ovtsharenko, Platnick & Marusik, 1995 — Russia (Far East, east Siberia)
- Parasyrisca iskander Ovtsharenko, Platnick & Marusik, 1995 — Tajikistan
- Parasyrisca khubsugul Ovtsharenko, Platnick & Marusik, 1995 — Mongolia
- Parasyrisca koksu Ovtsharenko, Platnick & Marusik, 1995 — Kyrgyzstan
- Parasyrisca kosachevi Fomichev, Marusik & Sidorov, 2018 — Mongolia
- Parasyrisca kurgan Ovtsharenko, Platnick & Marusik, 1995 — Kyrgyzstan
- Parasyrisca kyzylart Ovtsharenko, Platnick & Marusik, 1995 — Kyrgyzstan
- Parasyrisca logunovi Ovtsharenko, Platnick & Marusik, 1995 — Russia (south Siberia)
- Parasyrisca marusiki Kovblyuk, 2003 — Ukraine
- Parasyrisca mikhailovi Ovtsharenko, Platnick & Marusik, 1995 — Russia (Caucasus)
- Parasyrisca narynica Ovtsharenko, Platnick & Marusik, 1995 — Kyrgyzstan, Tajikistan
- Parasyrisca orites (Chamberlin & Gertsch, 1940) — USA, Canada
- Parasyrisca otmek Ovtsharenko, Platnick & Marusik, 1995 — Kyrgyzstan
- Parasyrisca paironica Ovtsharenko, Platnick & Marusik, 1995 — Tajikistan
- Parasyrisca pamirica Ovtsharenko, Platnick & Marusik, 1995 — Tajikistan
- Parasyrisca potanini Schenkel, 1963 (type) — Russia (south Siberia), Mongolia, China
- Parasyrisca pshartica Ovtsharenko, Platnick & Marusik, 1995 — Tajikistan
- Parasyrisca schenkeli Ovtsharenko & Marusik, 1988 — Kazakhstan, Mongolia, China
- Parasyrisca shakhristanica Ovtsharenko, Platnick & Marusik, 1995 — Tajikistan
- Parasyrisca sollers (Simon, 1895) — Mongolia, China
- Parasyrisca songi Marusik & Fritzén, 2009 — China
- Parasyrisca sulaki Fomichev, Marusik & Sidorov, 2018 — Kazakhstan
- Parasyrisca susamyr Ovtsharenko, Platnick & Marusik, 1995 — Kyrgyzstan
- Parasyrisca terskei Ovtsharenko, Platnick & Marusik, 1995 — Kyrgyzstan
- Parasyrisca tronovorum Fomichev, Marusik & Sidorov, 2018 — Mongolia
- Parasyrisca turkenica Ovtsharenko, Platnick & Marusik, 1995 — Turkey
- Parasyrisca tyshchenkoi Ovtsharenko, Platnick & Marusik, 1995 — Russia (south and east Siberia)
- Parasyrisca ulykpani Ovtsharenko, Platnick & Marusik, 1995 — Russia (south Siberia), Mongolia
- Parasyrisca vakhanski Ovtsharenko, Platnick & Marusik, 1995 — Tajikistan
- Parasyrisca vinosa (Simon, 1878) — Europe (Alps, Pyrenees)
- Parasyrisca volynkini Fomichev, 2016 — Russia (south Siberia)
- Parasyrisca vorobica Ovtsharenko, Platnick & Marusik, 1995 — Tajikistan

=== Phaeocedus ===
Phaeocedus Simon, 1893

- Phaeocedus braccatus (L. Koch, 1866) (type) — Europe, Turkey, Caucasus, Russia (Europe to Far East), Kazakhstan, Central Asia, China, Japan
  - Phaeocedus braccatus jugorum Simon, 1914 — France
- Phaeocedus fedotovi Charitonov, 1946 — Uzbekistan
- Phaeocedus haribhaiius Patel & Patel, 1975 — India
- Phaeocedus hebraeus Levy, 1999 — Israel
- Phaeocedus mikha Levy, 2009 — Israel, Portugal
- Phaeocedus mosambaensis Tikader, 1964 — Nepal
- Phaeocedus nicobarensis Tikader, 1977 — India (Nicobar Is.)
- Phaeocedus parvus O. Pickard-Cambridge, 1906 — probably India
- Phaeocedus poonaensis Tikader, 1982 — India

=== Plutonodomus ===
Plutonodomus Cooke, 1964

- Plutonodomus kungwensis Cooke, 1964 (type) — Tanzania

=== Poecilochroa ===
Poecilochroa Westring, 1874

- Poecilochroa albomaculata (Lucas, 1846) — Western Mediterranean
- Poecilochroa alcala Barrion & Litsinger, 1995 — Philippines
- Poecilochroa anomala (Hewitt, 1915) — South Africa
- Poecilochroa antineae Fage, 1929 — Mali
- Poecilochroa barmani Tikader, 1982 — India
- Poecilochroa behni Thorell, 1891 — India (Nicobar Is.)
- Poecilochroa bifasciata Banks, 1902 — Ecuador (Galapagos Is.)
- Poecilochroa capensis Strand, 1909 — South Africa
- Poecilochroa carinata Caporiacco, 1947 — Uganda
- Poecilochroa dayamibrookiana Barrion & Litsinger, 1995 — Philippines
- Poecilochroa devendrai Gajbe & Rane, 1985 — India
- Poecilochroa faradjensis Lessert, 1929 — Congo
- Poecilochroa furcata Simon, 1914 — France, Italy, Greece
- Poecilochroa golan Levy, 1999 — Israel
- Poecilochroa haplostyla Simon, 1907 — São Tomé and Príncipe
- Poecilochroa incompta (Pavesi, 1880) — Tunisia
- Poecilochroa insularis Kulczyński, 1911 — Indonesia (Java)
- Poecilochroa involuta Tucker, 1923 — South Africa
- Poecilochroa joreungensis Paik, 1992 — Korea
- Poecilochroa latefasciata Simon, 1893 — Peru
- Poecilochroa loricata Kritscher, 1996 — Malta
- Poecilochroa malagassa Strand, 1907 — Madagascar
- Poecilochroa parangunifasciata Barrion & Litsinger, 1995 — Philippines
- Poecilochroa patricia (Simon, 1878) — France (Corsica)
- Poecilochroa pauciaculeis Caporiacco, 1947 — East Africa
- Poecilochroa perversa Simon, 1914 — France
- Poecilochroa phyllobia (Thorell, 1871) — Italy
- Poecilochroa pugnax (O. Pickard-Cambridge, 1874) — Libya, Egypt, Ethiopia, Israel
- Poecilochroa rollini Berland, 1933 — French Polynesia (Marquesas Is., Tuamotu)
- Poecilochroa sedula (Simon, 1897) — India
- Poecilochroa senilis (O. Pickard-Cambridge, 1872) — France (Corsica) to Turkmenistan
  - Poecilochroa senilis auspex (Simon, 1878) — Spain, France
- Poecilochroa taborensis Levy, 1999 — Israel, Cyprus, Greece, Portugal
- Poecilochroa taeguensis Paik, 1992 — Korea
- Poecilochroa tikaderi Patel, 1989 — India
- Poecilochroa tridotus Caleb & Mathai, 2013 — India
- Poecilochroa trifasciata Mello-Leitão, 1918 — Brazil
- Poecilochroa variana (C. L. Koch, 1839) (type) — Europe to Central Asia
- Poecilochroa viduata (Pavesi, 1883) — Ethiopia
- Poecilochroa vittata Kulczyński, 1911 — Indonesia (Java)

=== Prodida ===
Prodida Dalmas, 1919

- Prodida longiventris Dalmas, 1919 (type) — Philippines
- Prodida stella Saaristo, 2002 — Seychelles

=== Prodidomus ===
Prodidomus Hentz, 1847

- Prodidomus amaranthinus (Lucas, 1846) — Mediterranean
- Prodidomus aurantiacus Simon, 1890 — Yemen
- Prodidomus beattyi Platnick, 1977 — Australia (Western Australia, Northern Territory)
- Prodidomus bendee Platnick & Baehr, 2006 — Australia (Queensland)
- Prodidomus bicolor Denis, 1957 — Sudan
- Prodidomus birmanicus Thorell, 1897 — Myanmar
- Prodidomus bryantae Alayón, 1995 — Cuba
- Prodidomus capensis Purcell, 1904 — South Africa
- Prodidomus chaperi (Simon, 1884) — India
- Prodidomus clarki Cooke, 1964 — Ascension Is.
- Prodidomus dalmasi Berland, 1920 — Kenya
- Prodidomus djibutensis Dalmas, 1919 — Somalia
- Prodidomus domesticus Lessert, 1938 — Congo
- Prodidomus duffeyi Cooke, 1964 — Ascension Is.
- Prodidomus flavidus (Simon, 1884) — Algeria
- Prodidomus flavipes Lawrence, 1952 — South Africa
- Prodidomus flavus Platnick & Baehr, 2006 — Australia (Queensland)
- Prodidomus geniculosus Dalmas, 1919 — Tunisia
- Prodidomus granulosus Cooke, 1964 — Rwanda
- Prodidomus hispanicus Dalmas, 1919 — Spain, Greece
- Prodidomus kimberley Platnick & Baehr, 2006 — Australia (Western Australia, Northern Territory)
- Prodidomus lampei Strand, 1915 — Namibia
- Prodidomus lampeli Cooke, 1964 — Ethiopia
- Prodidomus latebricola Cooke, 1964 — Tanzania
- Prodidomus margala Platnick, 1976 — Pakistan
- Prodidomus maximus Lessert, 1936 — Mozambique
- Prodidomus nigellus Simon, 1890 — Yemen
- Prodidomus nigricaudus Simon, 1893 — Venezuela
- Prodidomus opacithorax Simon, 1893 — Venezuela
- Prodidomus palkai Cooke, 1972 — India
- Prodidomus papavanasanemensis Cooke, 1972 — India
- Prodidomus purpurascens Purcell, 1904 — South Africa
- Prodidomus purpureus Simon, 1907 — West Africa
- Prodidomus redikorzevi Spassky, 1940 — Turkey, Azerbaijan, Iran, Kazakhstan, Turkmenistan
- Prodidomus reticulatus Lawrence, 1927 — Namibia
- Prodidomus revocatus Cooke, 1964 — Mauritius
- Prodidomus robustus Dalmas, 1919 — Ethiopia
- Prodidomus rodolphianus Dalmas, 1919 — East Africa
- Prodidomus rollasoni Cooke, 1964 — Libya
- Prodidomus rufus Hentz, 1847 (type) — Israel, China, Japan, New Caledonia, USA, Cuba, Argentina, Chile, St. Helena
- Prodidomus saharanpurensis (Tikader, 1982) — India
- Prodidomus sampeyi Platnick & Baehr, 2006 — Australia (Western Australia)
- Prodidomus seemani Platnick & Baehr, 2006 — Australia (Queensland)
- Prodidomus simoni Dalmas, 1919 — South Africa
- Prodidomus singulus Suman, 1967 — Hawaii
- Prodidomus sirohi Platnick, 1976 — India
- Prodidomus tigrinus Dalmas, 1919 — West Africa
- Prodidomus tirumalai Cooke, 1972 — India
- Prodidomus venkateswarai Cooke, 1972 — India
- Prodidomus watongwensis Cooke, 1964 — Tanzania
- Prodidomus woodleigh Platnick & Baehr, 2006 — Australia (Western Australia)
- Prodidomus wunderlichi Deeleman-Reinhold, 2001 — Thailand
- Prodidomus yorke Platnick & Baehr, 2006 — Australia (Queensland)

=== Pseudodrassus ===
Pseudodrassus Caporiacco, 1935

- Pseudodrassus pichoni Schenkel, 1963 — China
- Pseudodrassus quadridentatus (Caporiacco, 1928) — Libya
- Pseudodrassus ricasolii Caporiacco, 1935 (type) — Turkey
- Pseudodrassus scorteccii Caporiacco, 1936 — Libya

=== Pterotricha ===
Pterotricha Kulczyński, 1903

- Pterotricha aethiopica (L. Koch, 1875) — Ethiopia
- Pterotricha algerica Dalmas, 1921 — Algeria, Libya
- Pterotricha arabica Zamani, 2018 — United Arab Emirates
- Pterotricha arcifera (Simon, 1882) — Yemen
- Pterotricha argentosa Charitonov, 1946 — Uzbekistan
- Pterotricha arzhantsevi Fomichev, Marusik & Koponen, 2018 — Iraq
- Pterotricha auris (Tucker, 1923) — South Africa
- Pterotricha cambridgei (L. Koch, 1872) — Syria, Israel
- Pterotricha chazaliae (Simon, 1895) — Morocco, Mauritania, Algeria, Israel
- Pterotricha conspersa (O. Pickard-Cambridge, 1872) — Libya, Egypt, Israel
- Pterotricha dalmasi Fage, 1929 — Algeria, Egypt, Sudan, Israel, Jordan, Saudi Arabia, United Arab Emirates, Iran?
- Pterotricha djibutensis Dalmas, 1921 — Somalia
- Pterotricha egens Denis, 1966 — Libya
- Pterotricha engediensis Levy, 1995 — Israel
- Pterotricha esyunini Zamani, 2018 — United Arab Emirates
- Pterotricha insolita Dalmas, 1921 — Algeria
- Pterotricha kochi (O. Pickard-Cambridge, 1872) — Turkey, Lebanon, Syria, Israel
- Pterotricha kovblyuki Zamani & Marusik, 2018 — United Arab Emirates, Iran
- Pterotricha lentiginosa (C. L. Koch, 1837) (type) — Balkans, Greece, Turkey, Ukraine
- Pterotricha lesserti Dalmas, 1921 — Turkey, Egypt, Israel, Saudi Arabia
- Pterotricha levantina Levy, 1995 — Israel
- Pterotricha linnaei (Audouin, 1826) — Egypt
- Pterotricha lutata (O. Pickard-Cambridge, 1872) — Lebanon, Israel
- Pterotricha marginalis (Tucker, 1923) — South Africa
- Pterotricha mauritanica Denis, 1945 — Mauritania
- Pterotricha montana Zamani & Marusik, 2018 — Iran
- Pterotricha nadolnyi Zamani, 2018 — United Arab Emirates
- Pterotricha nomas (Thorell, 1875) — Russia (Europe)
- Pterotricha parasyriaca Levy, 1995 — Israel
- Pterotricha paupercula Denis, 1966 — Libya
- Pterotricha pavlovskyi Spassky, 1952 — Tajikistan
- Pterotricha procera (O. Pickard-Cambridge, 1874) — Egypt, Israel
- Pterotricha pseudoparasyriaca Nuruyeva & Huseynov, 2016 — Azerbaijan, Iran
- Pterotricha punctifera Dalmas, 1921 — Yemen
- Pterotricha quagga (Pavesi, 1884) — Ethiopia
- Pterotricha saga (Dönitz & Strand, 1906) — Japan
- Pterotricha schaefferi (Audouin, 1826) — Libya, Egypt, Sudan, Israel
- Pterotricha simoni Dalmas, 1921 — Spain
- Pterotricha sinoniae Caporiacco, 1953 — Italy
- Pterotricha somaliensis Dalmas, 1921 — Somalia
- Pterotricha stevensi Zamani, 2018 — United Arab Emirates
- Pterotricha strandi Spassky, 1936 — Iran, Turkmenistan, Afghanistan, India
- Pterotricha syriaca Dalmas, 1921 — Syria
- Pterotricha vicina Dalmas, 1921 — Algeria, Libya

=== Pterotrichina ===
Pterotrichina Dalmas, 1921

- Pterotrichina elegans Dalmas, 1921 (type) — Algeria, Tunisia
- Pterotrichina nova Caporiacco, 1934 — Karakorum

=== Purcelliana ===
Purcelliana Cooke, 1964

- Purcelliana problematica Cooke, 1964 (type) — South Africa

== S ==
=== Sanitubius ===
Sanitubius Kamura, 2001

- Sanitubius anatolicus (Kamura, 1989) — China, Korea, Japan

=== Scopoides ===
Scopoides Platnick, 1989

- Scopoides asceticus (Chamberlin, 1924) — Mexico
- Scopoides bryantae (Platnick & Shadab, 1976) — USA, Mexico
- Scopoides cambridgei (Gertsch & Davis, 1940) — USA, Mexico
- Scopoides catharius (Chamberlin, 1922) (type) — USA
- Scopoides gertschi (Platnick, 1978) — USA
- Scopoides gyirongensis Hu, 2001 — China
- Scopoides kastoni (Platnick & Shadab, 1976) — USA, Mexico
- Scopoides kuljitae (Tikader, 1982) — India
- Scopoides maitraiae (Tikader & Gajbe, 1977) — India
- Scopoides naturalisticus (Chamberlin, 1924) — USA, Mexico
- Scopoides nesiotes (Chamberlin, 1924) — USA, Mexico
- Scopoides ochraceus (F. O. Pickard-Cambridge, 1899) — Mexico
- Scopoides pritiae (Tikader, 1982) — India
- Scopoides rostratus (Platnick & Shadab, 1976) — Mexico
- Scopoides samarae Gawande & Bodkhe, 2018 — India
- Scopoides santiago (Platnick & Shadab, 1976) — Mexico
- Scopoides tikaderi (Gajbe, 1987) — India
- Scopoides tlacolula (Platnick & Shadab, 1976) — Mexico
- Scopoides wanglangensis Yuan, Zhao & Zhang, 2019 — China
- Scopoides xizangensis Hu, 2001 — China

=== Scotocesonia ===
Scotocesonia Caporiacco, 1947

- Scotocesonia demerarae Caporiacco, 1947 (type) — Guyana

=== Scotognapha ===
Scotognapha Dalmas, 1920

- Scotognapha arcuata Wunderlich, 2011 — Canary Is.
- Scotognapha atomaria Dalmas, 1920 — Canary Is.
- Scotognapha brunnea Schmidt, 1980 — Canary Is.
- Scotognapha canaricola (Strand, 1911) — Canary Is.
- Scotognapha convexa (Simon, 1883) (type) — Canary Is.
- Scotognapha costacalma Platnick, Ovtsharenko & Murphy, 2001 — Canary Is.
- Scotognapha galletas Platnick, Ovtsharenko & Murphy, 2001 — Canary Is.
- Scotognapha haria Platnick, Ovtsharenko & Murphy, 2001 — Canary Is.
- Scotognapha juangrandica Platnick, Ovtsharenko & Murphy, 2001 — Canary Is.
- Scotognapha medano Platnick, Ovtsharenko & Murphy, 2001 — Canary Is.
- Scotognapha paivani (Blackwall, 1864) — Selvagens Is.
- Scotognapha taganana Platnick, Ovtsharenko & Murphy, 2001 — Canary Is.
- Scotognapha teideensis (Wunderlich, 1992) — Canary Is.
- Scotognapha wunderlichi Platnick, Ovtsharenko & Murphy, 2001 — Canary Is.

=== Scotophaeus ===
Scotophaeus

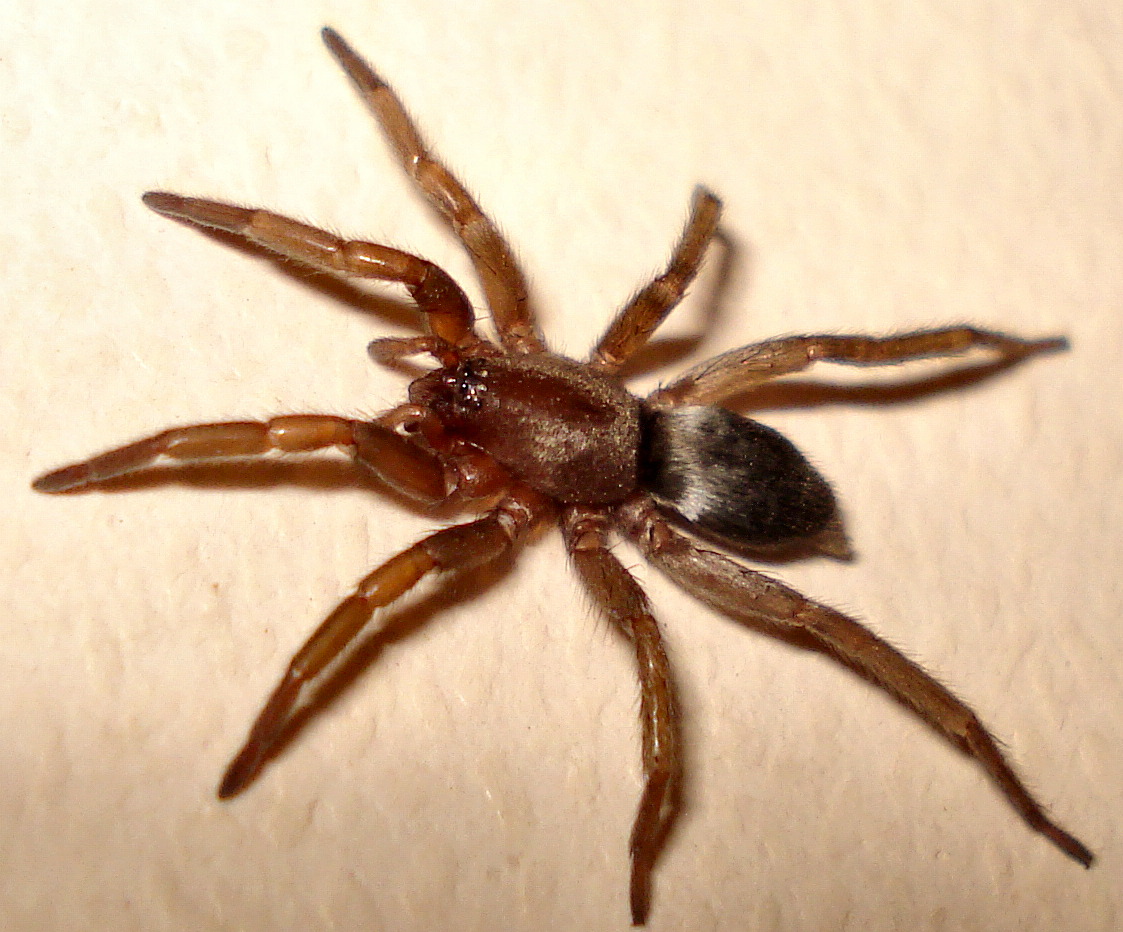
Mouse spider
(Scotophaeus blackwalli)

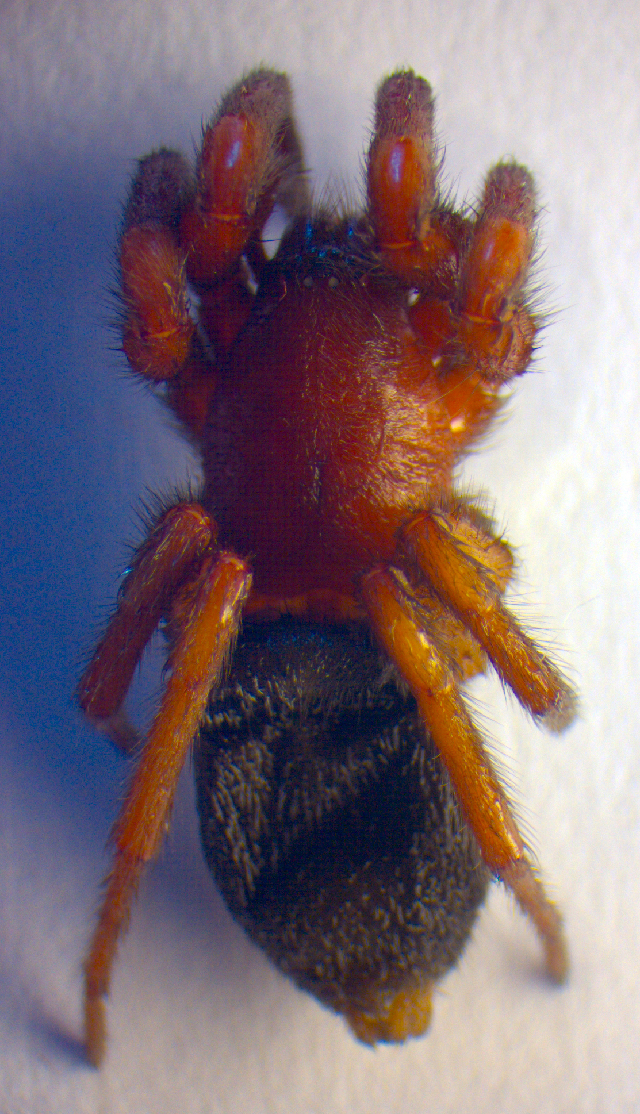
Scotophaeus scutulatus

Scotophaeus Simon, 1893

- Scotophaeus aculeatus Simon, 1914 — France
- Scotophaeus affinis Caporiacco, 1949 — Kenya
- Scotophaeus afghanicus Roewer, 1961 — Afghanistan
- Scotophaeus arboricola Jézéquel, 1965 — Ivory Coast
- Scotophaeus bersebaensis Strand, 1915 — Namibia
- Scotophaeus bharatae Gajbe, 1989 — India
- Scotophaeus bifidus Schmidt & Krause, 1994 — Cape Verde Is.
- Scotophaeus blackwalli (Thorell, 1871) — Europe, Caucasus. Introduced to North America, Peru, Hawaii
  - Scotophaeus blackwalli isabellinus (Simon, 1873) — France (Corsica), Italy, Croatia
  - Scotophaeus blackwalli politus (Simon, 1878) — France
- Scotophaeus brolemanni Simon, 1914 — France
- Scotophaeus cecileae Barrion & Litsinger, 1995 — Philippines
- Scotophaeus correntinus Mello-Leitão, 1945 — Argentina
- Scotophaeus crinitus Jézéquel, 1965 — Ivory Coast
- Scotophaeus dispulsus (O. Pickard-Cambridge, 1885) — Tajikistan, Mongolia
- Scotophaeus dolanskyi Lissner, 2017 — Portugal
- Scotophaeus domesticus Tikader, 1962 — India
- Scotophaeus fabrisae Caporiacco, 1950 — Italy
- Scotophaeus faisalabadiensis Ghafoor & Beg, 2002 — Pakistan
- Scotophaeus gridellii Caporiacco, 1928 — Canary Is.
- Scotophaeus hierro Schmidt, 1977 — Canary Is.
- Scotophaeus hunan Zhang, Song & Zhu, 2003 — China, Japan
- Scotophaeus insularis Berland, 1936 — Cape Verde Is., Greece
- Scotophaeus invisus (O. Pickard-Cambridge, 1885) — China (Yarkand)
- Scotophaeus jacksoni Berland, 1936 — Cape Verde Is.
- Scotophaeus jinlin Song, Zhu & Zhang, 2004 — China
- Scotophaeus kalimpongensis Gajbe, 1992 — India
- Scotophaeus lamperti Strand, 1906 — Central Africa
- Scotophaeus lindbergi Roewer, 1961 — Afghanistan
- Scotophaeus madalasae Tikader & Gajbe, 1977 — India
- Scotophaeus marleyi Tucker, 1923 — South Africa
- Scotophaeus mauckneri Schmidt, 1956 — Canary Is.
- Scotophaeus merkaricola Strand, 1907 — India
- Scotophaeus meruensis Tullgren, 1910 — East Africa
- Scotophaeus microdon Caporiacco, 1933 — Libya
- Scotophaeus musculus (Simon, 1878) — Salvages, Madeira, France
- Scotophaeus nanoides Wunderlich, 2011 — Portugal
- Scotophaeus nanus Wunderlich, 1995 — Austria
- Scotophaeus natalensis Lawrence, 1938 — South Africa
- Scotophaeus nigrosegmentatus (Simon, 1895) — Mongolia, Karakorum
- Scotophaeus nossibeensis Strand, 1907 — Madagascar
- Scotophaeus nyrensis Simon, 1909 — East Africa
- Scotophaeus parvioculis Strand, 1906 — Ethiopia
- Scotophaeus peninsularis Roewer, 1928 — Greece (incl. Crete), Israel
- Scotophaeus poonaensis Tikader, 1982 — India
- Scotophaeus pretiosus (L. Koch, 1873) — New Zealand
- Scotophaeus purcelli Tucker, 1923 — South Africa
- Scotophaeus quadripunctatus (Linnaeus, 1758) (type) — Europe, Turkey, Caucasus
- Scotophaeus rajasthanus Tikader, 1966 — India
- Scotophaeus rebellatus (Simon, 1880) — China
- Scotophaeus regularis Tullgren, 1910 — East Africa
- Scotophaeus relegatus Purcell, 1907 — Namibia, South Africa
- Scotophaeus retusus (Simon, 1878) — France
- Scotophaeus rufescens (Kroneberg, 1875) — Central Asia
- Scotophaeus schenkeli Caporiacco, 1949 — Kenya
- Scotophaeus scutulatus (L. Koch, 1866) — Europe, Algeria, Turkey, Caucasus, Russia (Europe to south Siberia), Central Asia
- Scotophaeus semitectus (Simon, 1886) — Senegal
- Scotophaeus simlaensis Tikader, 1982 — India, China
- Scotophaeus strandi Caporiacco, 1940 — Ethiopia
- Scotophaeus tubicola Schmidt, 1990 — Canary Is.
- Scotophaeus typhlus Schmidt & Piepho, 1994 — Cape Verde Is.
- Scotophaeus validus (Lucas, 1846) — Southern Europe, Morocco, Algeria
- Scotophaeus westringi Simon, 1914 — France
- Scotophaeus xizang Zhang, Song & Zhu, 2003 — China

=== Sergiolus ===
Sergiolus

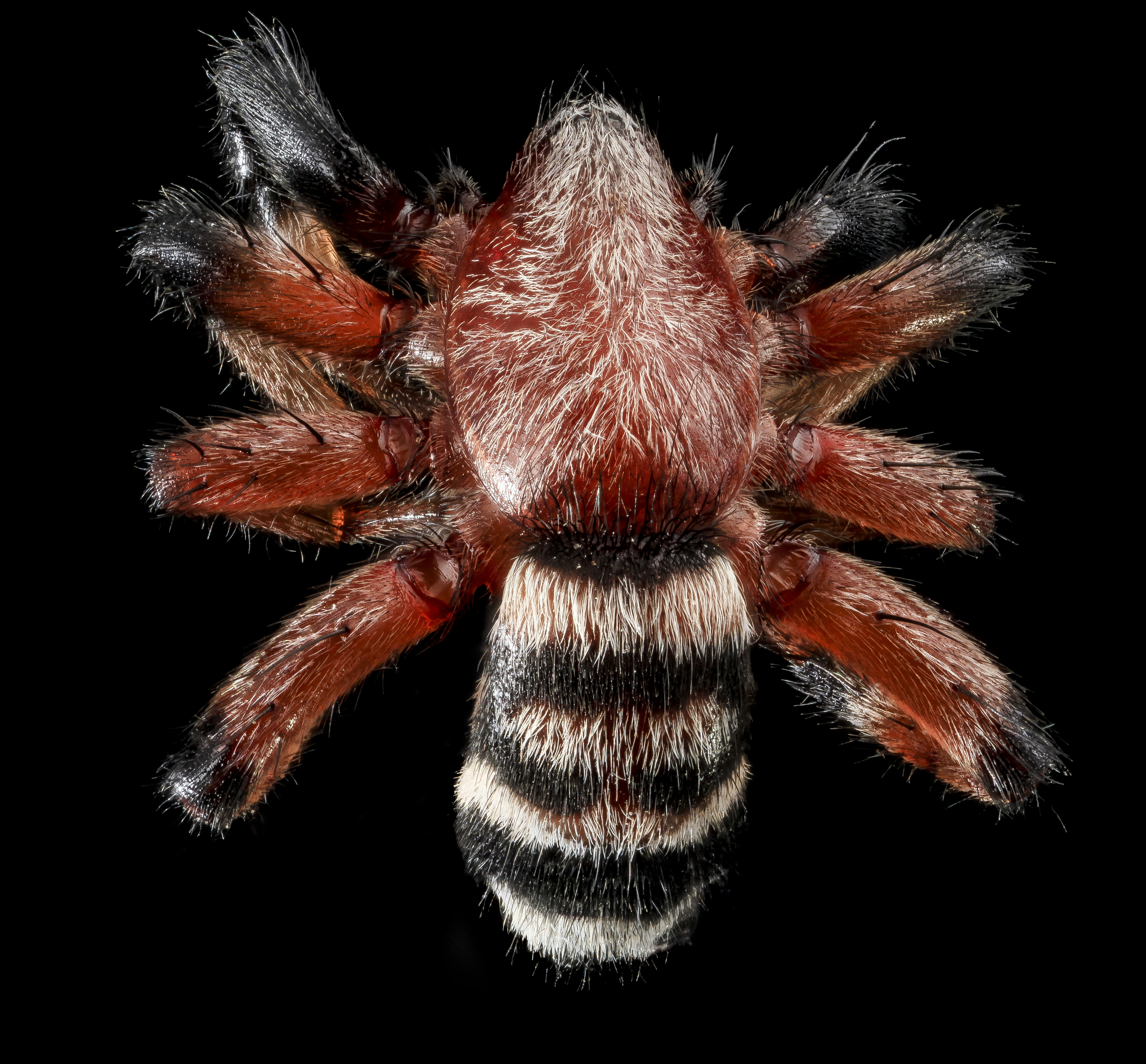
Sergiolus capulatus

Sergiolus Simon, 1892

- Sergiolus angustus (Banks, 1904) — North America
- Sergiolus bicolor Banks, 1900 — USA, Canada
- Sergiolus capulatus (Walckenaer, 1837) (type) — USA, Canada
- Sergiolus columbianus (Emerton, 1917) — USA, Canada
- Sergiolus cyaneiventris Simon, 1893 — USA, Cuba
- Sergiolus decoratus Kaston, 1945 — USA, Canada
- Sergiolus gertschi Platnick & Shadab, 1981 — USA, Mexico
- Sergiolus guadalupensis Platnick & Shadab, 1981 — Mexico
- Sergiolus hosiziro (Yaginuma, 1960) — China, Korea, Japan
- Sergiolus iviei Platnick & Shadab, 1981 — USA, Canada
- Sergiolus kastoni Platnick & Shadab, 1981 — USA, Cuba
- Sergiolus khodiarae Patel, 1988 — India
- Sergiolus lamhetaghatensis Gajbe & Gajbe, 1999 — India
- Sergiolus lowelli Chamberlin & Woodbury, 1929 — USA, Mexico
- Sergiolus magnus (Bryant, 1948) — Hispaniola
- Sergiolus mainlingensis Hu, 2001 — China
- Sergiolus meghalayensis Tikader & Gajbe, 1976 — India
- Sergiolus minutus (Banks, 1898) — USA, Cuba, Jamaica
- Sergiolus montanus (Emerton, 1890) — North America
- Sergiolus ocellatus (Walckenaer, 1837) — USA, Canada
- Sergiolus poonaensis Tikader & Gajbe, 1976 — India
- Sergiolus singhi Tikader & Gajbe, 1976 — India
- Sergiolus songi Xu, 1991 — China
- Sergiolus stella Chamberlin, 1922 — USA, Mexico
- Sergiolus tennesseensis Chamberlin, 1922 — USA
- Sergiolus unimaculatus Emerton, 1915 — USA, Canada

=== Sernokorba ===
Sernokorba Kamura, 1992

- Sernokorba fanjing Song, Zhu & Zhang, 2004 — China
- Sernokorba pallidipatellis (Bösenberg & Strand, 1906) (type) — Russia (Far East), China, Korea, Japan
- Sernokorba tescorum (Simon, 1914) — France, Spain

=== Setaphis ===
Setaphis Simon, 1893

- Setaphis algerica (Dalmas, 1922) — Spain, Algeria
- Setaphis atlantica (Berland, 1936) — Cape Verde Is.
- Setaphis browni (Tucker, 1923) — Central, South Africa to Pakistan, India
- Setaphis canariensis (Simon, 1883) — Canary Is., Madeira
- Setaphis carmeli (O. Pickard-Cambridge, 1872) — Canary Is., Mediterranean
- Setaphis fuscipes (Simon, 1885) — Morocco to Israel
- Setaphis gomerae (Schmidt, 1981) — Canary Is.
- Setaphis jocquei Platnick & Murphy, 1996 — Ivory Coast
- Setaphis makalali FitzPatrick, 2005 — South Africa
- Setaphis mediterranea Levy, 2009 — Israel
- Setaphis mollis (O. Pickard-Cambridge, 1874) — North Africa, Israel
- Setaphis murphyi Wunderlich, 2011 — Canary Is.
- Setaphis parvula (Lucas, 1846) (type) — Mediterranean
- Setaphis salrei Schmidt, 1999 — Cape Verde Is.
- Setaphis sexmaculata Simon, 1893 — South Africa
- Setaphis simplex (Simon, 1885) — Tunisia
- Setaphis spiribulbis (Denis, 1952) — Morocco
- Setaphis subtilis (Simon, 1897) — West, South Africa to Philippines
- Setaphis villiersi (Denis, 1955) — Niger, Somalia, Ethiopia
- Setaphis walteri Platnick & Murphy, 1996 — Canary Is.
- Setaphis wunderlichi Platnick & Murphy, 1996 — Canary Is.

=== Shaitan ===
Shaitan Kovblyuk, Kastrygina & Marusik, 2013

- Shaitan elchini Kovblyuk, Kastrygina & Marusik, 2013 (type) — Russia (Europe), Azerbaijan, Kazakhstan

=== Shiragaia ===
Shiragaia Paik, 1992

- Shiragaia taeguensis Paik, 1992 (type) — Korea

=== Sidydrassus ===
Sidydrassus Esyunin & Tuneva, 2002

- Sidydrassus rogue Tuneva, 2004 — Kazakhstan
- Sidydrassus shumakovi (Spassky, 1934) (type) — Russia (Europe), Azerbaijan, Iran, Kazakhstan
- Sidydrassus tianschanicus (Hu & Wu, 1989) — China

=== Smionia ===
Smionia Dalmas, 1920

- Smionia capensis Dalmas, 1920 (type) — South Africa
- Smionia lineatipes (Purcell, 1908) — Botswana, South Africa

=== Sosticus ===
Sosticus Chamberlin, 1922

- Sosticus californicus Platnick & Shadab, 1976 — USA
- Sosticus dherikanalensis Gajbe, 1979 — India
- Sosticus insularis (Banks, 1895) (type) — USA, Canada
- Sosticus jabalpurensis Bhandari & Gajbe, 2001 — India
- Sosticus loricatus (L. Koch, 1866) — Europe, Caucasus, Russia (Europe to Far East), Iran, Central Asia, China. Introduced to North America
- Sosticus nainitalensis Gajbe, 1979 — India
- Sosticus pawani Gajbe, 1993 — India
- Sosticus poonaensis Tikader, 1982 — India
- Sosticus solanensis Gajbe, 1979 — India
- Sosticus sundargarhensis Gajbe, 1979 — India

=== Symphanodes ===
Symphanodes Rainbow, 1916

- Symphanodes dianiphus Rainbow, 1916 (type) — Australia (Queensland)

=== Synaphosus ===
Synaphosus Platnick & Shadab, 1980

- Synaphosus cangshanus Yang, Yang & Zhang, 2013 — China
- Synaphosus daweiensis Yin, Bao & Peng, 2002 — China
- Synaphosus dubius Marusik & Omelko, 2018 — Thailand
- Synaphosus evertsi Ovtsharenko, Levy & Platnick, 1994 — Ivory Coast, Indonesia (Bali), Philippines
- Synaphosus femininis Deeleman-Reinhold, 2001 — China, Laos, Indonesia (Java)
- Synaphosus gracillimus (O. Pickard-Cambridge, 1872) — Egypt, Israel
- Synaphosus intricatus (Denis, 1947) — Algeria, Egypt
- Synaphosus iunctus Sankaran & Sebastian, 2018 — India
- Synaphosus jaegeri Marusik & Omelko, 2018 — Laos
- Synaphosus kakamega Ovtsharenko, Levy & Platnick, 1994 — Kenya
- Synaphosus karakumensis Ovtsharenko, Levy & Platnick, 1994 — Turkmenistan
- Synaphosus khashm Ovtsharenko, Levy & Platnick, 1994 — Saudi Arabia
- Synaphosus lehtineni Marusik & Omelko, 2018 — Indonesia (Sulawesi)
- Synaphosus makhambetensis Ponomarev, 2008 — Kazakhstan
- Synaphosus minimus (Caporiacco, 1936) — Libya, Egypt
- Synaphosus mongolicus Marusik & Fomichev, 2016 — Mongolia
- Synaphosus nanus (O. Pickard-Cambridge, 1872) — Israel
- Synaphosus neali Ovtsharenko, Levy & Platnick, 1994 — Iran, Pakistan
- Synaphosus ovtsharenkoi Marusik & Fomichev, 2016 — Mongolia
- Synaphosus palearcticus Ovtsharenko, Levy & Platnick, 1994 — Greece, Turkey to Central Asia
- Synaphosus paludis (Chamberlin & Gertsch, 1940) — USA
- Synaphosus raveni Deeleman-Reinhold, 2001 — Thailand
- Synaphosus saidovi Marusik & Fomichev, 2016 — Tajikistan
- Synaphosus sauvage Ovtsharenko, Levy & Platnick, 1994 — Spain, France, Switzerland, Italy
- Synaphosus shirin Ovtsharenko, Levy & Platnick, 1994 — Cyprus, Iran
- Synaphosus shmakovi Marusik & Fomichev, 2016 — Mongolia
- Synaphosus soyunovi Ovtsharenko, Levy & Platnick, 1994 — Turkmenistan
- Synaphosus syntheticus (Chamberlin, 1924) (type) — Libya, Egypt, Israel, Saudi Arabia. Introduced to USA, Mexico
- Synaphosus taukum Ovtsharenko, Levy & Platnick, 1994 — Kazakhstan
- Synaphosus trichopus (Roewer, 1928) — Greece, Crete
- Synaphosus turanicus Ovtsharenko, Levy & Platnick, 1994 — Central Asia
- Synaphosus yatenga Ovtsharenko, Levy & Platnick, 1994 — Burkina Faso

== T ==
=== Talanites ===
Talanites Simon, 1893

- Talanites atscharicus Mcheidze, 1946 — Georgia, Kazakhstan
- Talanites captiosus (Gertsch & Davis, 1936) — USA, Mexico
- Talanites cavernicola Thorell, 1897 — Myanmar
- Talanites dunini Platnick & Ovtsharenko, 1991 — Israel, Central Asia
- Talanites echinus (Chamberlin, 1922) — USA
- Talanites exlineae (Platnick & Shadab, 1976) — USA
- Talanites fagei Spassky, 1938 — Azerbaijan, Russia (Europe) to Central Asia
- Talanites fervidus Simon, 1893 (type) — Egypt, Israel
- Talanites mikhailovi Platnick & Ovtsharenko, 1991 — Kazakhstan
- Talanites moodyae Platnick & Ovtsharenko, 1991 — USA
- Talanites ornatus (O. Pickard-Cambridge, 1874) — Egypt
- Talanites santschii Dalmas, 1918 — Tunisia
- Talanites strandi Spassky, 1940 — Ukraine, Russia (Europe), Kazakhstan
- Talanites tibialis Caporiacco, 1934 — India, Pakistan
- Talanites ubicki Platnick & Ovtsharenko, 1991 — USA

=== Talanitoides ===
Talanitoides Levy, 2009

- Talanitoides habesor Levy, 2009 (type) — Israel

=== Theuma ===
Theuma Simon, 1893

- Theuma ababensis Tucker, 1923 — South Africa
- Theuma andonea Lawrence, 1927 — Namibia
- Theuma aprica Simon, 1893 — South Africa
- Theuma capensis Purcell, 1907 — Botswana, South Africa
- Theuma cedri Purcell, 1907 — South Africa
- Theuma elucubata Tucker, 1923 — South Africa
- Theuma foveolata Tucker, 1923 — South Africa
- Theuma funerea Lawrence, 1928 — Namibia
- Theuma fusca Purcell, 1907 — Namibia, South Africa
- Theuma intermedia Strand, 1915 — Namibia
- Theuma longipes Lawrence, 1927 — Namibia
- Theuma maculata Purcell, 1907 — South Africa
- Theuma microphthalma Lawrence, 1928 — Namibia
- Theuma mutica Purcell, 1907 — South Africa
- Theuma ovambica Lawrence, 1927 — Namibia
- Theuma parva Purcell, 1907 — South Africa
- Theuma purcelli Tucker, 1923 — South Africa
- Theuma pusilla Purcell, 1908 — Namibia, South Africa
- Theuma recta Lawrence, 1927 — Namibia
- Theuma schreineri Purcell, 1907 — South Africa
- Theuma schultzei Purcell, 1908 — Namibia, South Africa
- Theuma tragardhi Lawrence, 1947 — South Africa
- Theuma velox Purcell, 1908 — Namibia
- Theuma walteri (Simon, 1889) (type) — Turkmenistan?
- Theuma xylina Simon, 1893 — South Africa
- Theuma zuluensis Lawrence, 1947 — South Africa

=== Theumella ===
Theumella Strand, 1906

- Theumella penicillata Strand, 1906 — Ethiopia
- Theumella typica Strand, 1906 (type) — Ethiopia

=== Titus ===
Titus O. Pickard-Cambridge, 1901

- Titus lugens O. Pickard-Cambridge, 1901 (type) — Zimbabwe

=== Tivodrassus ===
Tivodrassus Chamberlin & Ivie, 1936

- Tivodrassus ethophor Chamberlin & Ivie, 1936 (type) — Mexico
- Tivodrassus farias Platnick & Shadab, 1976 — Mexico
- Tivodrassus pecki Platnick & Shadab, 1976 — Mexico
- Tivodrassus reddelli Platnick & Shadab, 1976 — Mexico

=== Trachyzelotes ===
Trachyzelotes Lohmander, 1944

- Trachyzelotes adriaticus (Caporiacco, 1951) — Italy to China
- Trachyzelotes ansimensis Seo, 2002 — Korea
- Trachyzelotes baiyuensis Xu, 1991 — China
- Trachyzelotes barbatus (L. Koch, 1866) — Mediterranean to Caucasus. Introduced to USA
- Trachyzelotes bardiae (Caporiacco, 1928) — Mediterranean
- Trachyzelotes chybyndensis Tuneva & Esyunin, 2002 — Russia (Europe), Kazakhstan
- Trachyzelotes cumensis (Ponomarev, 1979) — Ukraine, Russia (Europe), Azerbaijan, Kazakhstan
- Trachyzelotes fuscipes (L. Koch, 1866) — Mediterranean, Kazakhstan, China
- Trachyzelotes glossus (Strand, 1915) — Turkey, Israel
- Trachyzelotes holosericeus (Simon, 1878) — Mediterranean
- Trachyzelotes huberti Platnick & Murphy, 1984 — Algeria, Italy, Albania
- Trachyzelotes jaxartensis (Kroneberg, 1875) — Northern Africa to Caucasus, Russia (Europe) to Central Asia, Iran. Introduced to Hawaii, USA, Mexico, South Africa, India, China
- Trachyzelotes kulczynskii (Bösenberg, 1902) — Macedonia, Bulgaria. Introduced to USA, Caribbean, Colombia, Brazil, Japan, Samoa
- Trachyzelotes lyonneti (Audouin, 1826) — Macaronesia, Mediterranean to Central Asia. Introduced to USA, Mexico, Peru, Brazil
- Trachyzelotes malkini Platnick & Murphy, 1984 — Romania, Albania, Macedonia, Bulgaria, Greece, Ukraine, Russia (Europe, Caucasus), Turkey, Iran, Kazakhstan
- Trachyzelotes manytchensis Ponomarev & Tsvetkov, 2006 — Russia (Europe), Iran
- Trachyzelotes miniglossus Levy, 2009 — Israel, Iran
- Trachyzelotes minutus Crespo, 2010 — Portugal
- Trachyzelotes mutabilis (Simon, 1878) — Mediterranean, Romania
- Trachyzelotes pedestris (C. L. Koch, 1837) (type) — Europe, Caucasus, Turkey, Iran
- Trachyzelotes ravidus (L. Koch, 1875) — Ethiopia
- Trachyzelotes stubbsi Platnick & Murphy, 1984 — Greece, Cyprus

=== Trephopoda ===
Trephopoda Tucker, 1923

- Trephopoda aplanita (Tucker, 1923) — South Africa
- Trephopoda biamenta (Tucker, 1923) — South Africa
- Trephopoda ctenipalpis (Lawrence, 1927) — Namibia
- Trephopoda hanoveria Tucker, 1923 (type) — South Africa
- Trephopoda kannemeyeri (Tucker, 1923) — South Africa
- Trephopoda parvipalpa (Tucker, 1923) — South Africa

=== Trichothyse ===
Trichothyse Tucker, 1923

- Trichothyse africana (Tucker, 1923) — South Africa
- Trichothyse fontensis Lawrence, 1928 — Namibia
- Trichothyse hortensis Tucker, 1923 (type) — South Africa
- Trichothyse subtropica Lawrence, 1927 — Namibia

=== Tricongius ===
Tricongius Simon, 1893

- Tricongius amazonicus Platnick & Höfer, 1990 — Brazil
- Tricongius collinus Simon, 1893 (type) — Venezuela
- Tricongius granadensis Mello-Leitão, 1941 — Colombia

=== Turkozelotes ===
Turkozelotes Kovblyuk & Seyyar, 2009

- Turkozelotes mccowani (Chatzaki & Russell-Smith, 2017) — Greece, Cyprus
- Turkozelotes microb Kovblyuk & Seyyar, 2009 (type) — Greece, Turkey
- Turkozelotes mirandus Ponomarev, 2011 — Russia (Europe), Iran

== U ==
=== Urozelotes ===
Urozelotes Mello-Leitão, 1938

- Urozelotes kabenge FitzPatrick, 2005 — Zambia
- Urozelotes mysticus Platnick & Murphy, 1984 — Italy
- Urozelotes patulusus Sankaran & Sebastian, 2018 — India
- Urozelotes rusticus (L. Koch, 1872) (type) — Both Americas, Africa, Europe, Asia, Australia. Native area unknown, probably Old World.
- Urozelotes trifidus Tuneva, 2003 — France, Russia (Europe)

== V ==
=== Verita ===
Verita Ramírez & Grismado, 2016

- Verita williamsi Ramírez & Grismado, 2016 (type) — Argentina

== W ==
=== Wesmaldra ===
Wesmaldra Platnick & Baehr, 2006

- Wesmaldra baynesi Platnick & Baehr, 2006 — Australia (Western Australia)
- Wesmaldra bidgemia Platnick & Baehr, 2006 (type) — Australia (Western Australia)
- Wesmaldra bromilowi Platnick & Baehr, 2006 — Australia (Western Australia)
- Wesmaldra hirsti Platnick & Baehr, 2006 — Australia (Western Australia)
- Wesmaldra kakadu Platnick & Baehr, 2006 — Australia (Northern Territory)
- Wesmaldra learmonth Platnick & Baehr, 2006 — Australia (Western Australia)
- Wesmaldra napier Platnick & Baehr, 2006 — Australia (Western Australia)
- Wesmaldra nixaut Platnick & Baehr, 2006 — Australia (Western Australia)
- Wesmaldra rolfei Platnick & Baehr, 2006 — Australia (Western Australia)
- Wesmaldra splendida (Simon, 1908) — Australia (Western Australia)
- Wesmaldra talgomine Platnick & Baehr, 2006 — Australia (Western Australia)
- Wesmaldra urawa Platnick & Baehr, 2006 — Australia (Western Australia)
- Wesmaldra waldockae Platnick & Baehr, 2006 — Australia (Western Australia)
- Wesmaldra wiluna Platnick & Baehr, 2006 — Australia (Western Australia)

=== Wydundra ===
Wydundra Platnick & Baehr, 2006

- Wydundra alexandria Platnick & Baehr, 2013 — Australia (Northern Territory)
- Wydundra anjo Platnick & Baehr, 2006 — Australia (Western Australia)
- Wydundra barrow Platnick & Baehr, 2006 — Australia (Western Australia, Northern Territory)
- Wydundra camooweal Platnick & Baehr, 2013 — Australia (Queensland)
- Wydundra carinda Platnick & Baehr, 2006 — Australia (South Australia, New South Wales)
- Wydundra charnley Platnick & Baehr, 2006 — Australia (Western Australia)
- Wydundra chillagoe Platnick & Baehr, 2013 — Australia (Queensland)
- Wydundra churchillae Platnick & Baehr, 2006 — Australia (Northern Territory)
- Wydundra clifton Platnick & Baehr, 2006 — Australia (South Australia)
- Wydundra cooper Platnick & Baehr, 2006 — Australia (South Australia, New South Wales)
- Wydundra cunderdin Platnick & Baehr, 2006 — Australia (Western Australia)
- Wydundra daunton Platnick & Baehr, 2006 — Australia (Queensland)
- Wydundra drysdale Platnick & Baehr, 2006 — Australia (Western Australia)
- Wydundra ethabuka Platnick & Baehr, 2006 — Australia (Northern Territory, Queensland)
- Wydundra fitzroy Platnick & Baehr, 2006 — Australia (Queensland)
- Wydundra flattery Platnick & Baehr, 2006 — Australia (Queensland)
- Wydundra garnet Platnick & Baehr, 2006 — Australia (Queensland)
- Wydundra gibb Platnick & Baehr, 2006 — Australia (Western Australia, Northern Territory)
- Wydundra gilliat Platnick & Baehr, 2013 — Australia (Queensland)
- Wydundra gully Platnick & Baehr, 2006 — Australia (Queensland)
- Wydundra gunbiyarrmi Platnick & Baehr, 2006 — Australia (Northern Territory)
- Wydundra humbert Platnick & Baehr, 2006 — Australia (Northern Territory)
- Wydundra humptydoo Platnick & Baehr, 2006 — Australia (Northern Territory)
- Wydundra jabiru Platnick & Baehr, 2006 — Australia (Northern Territory)
- Wydundra kalamurina Platnick & Baehr, 2006 — Australia (South Australia)
- Wydundra kennedy Platnick & Baehr, 2006 — Australia (Western Australia)
- Wydundra kohi Platnick & Baehr, 2006 — Australia (Queensland)
- Wydundra leichhardti Platnick & Baehr, 2013 — Australia (Queensland)
- Wydundra lennard Platnick & Baehr, 2006 — Australia (Western Australia)
- Wydundra lindsay Platnick & Baehr, 2006 — Australia (South Australia)
- Wydundra lowrie Platnick & Baehr, 2006 — Australia (Queensland)
- Wydundra moolooloo Platnick & Baehr, 2006 — Australia (South Australia)
- Wydundra moondarra Platnick & Baehr, 2006 — Australia (Queensland)
- Wydundra morton Platnick & Baehr, 2006 — Australia (New South Wales)
- Wydundra neinaut Platnick & Baehr, 2006 — Australia (Queensland)
- Wydundra newcastle Platnick & Baehr, 2006 — Australia (Queensland)
- Wydundra normanton Platnick & Baehr, 2006 — Australia (Queensland)
- Wydundra octomile Platnick & Baehr, 2006 — Australia (Queensland)
- Wydundra osbourne Platnick & Baehr, 2006 (type) — Australia (Queensland)
- Wydundra percy Platnick & Baehr, 2006 — Australia (Queensland)
- Wydundra solo Platnick & Baehr, 2006 — Australia (Western Australia)
- Wydundra uluru Platnick & Baehr, 2006 — Australia (Western Australia, Northern Territory)
- Wydundra undara Platnick & Baehr, 2006 — Australia (Queensland)
- Wydundra voc (Deeleman-Reinhold, 2001) — Malaysia, Indonesia Moluccas)
- Wydundra webberae Platnick & Baehr, 2006 — Australia (Northern Territory)
- Wydundra windsor Platnick & Baehr, 2006 — Australia (Queensland)

== X ==
=== Xerophaeus ===
Xerophaeus Purcell, 1907

- Xerophaeus ahenus Purcell, 1908 — South Africa
- Xerophaeus anthropoides Hewitt, 1916 — South Africa
- Xerophaeus appendiculatus Purcell, 1907 — South Africa
- Xerophaeus aridus Purcell, 1907 — Namibia, South Africa
- Xerophaeus aurariarum Purcell, 1907 — South Africa
- Xerophaeus bicavus Tucker, 1923 — South Africa
- Xerophaeus biplagiatus Tullgren, 1910 — East AFrica
- Xerophaeus capensis Purcell, 1907 (type) — South Africa
- Xerophaeus communis Purcell, 1907 — South Africa
- Xerophaeus coruscus (L. Koch, 1875) — Ethiopia, East Africa, Yemen
  - Xerophaeus coruscus kibonotensis Tullgren, 1910 — East, South Africa
- Xerophaeus crusculus Tucker, 1923 — South Africa
- Xerophaeus crustosus Purcell, 1907 — South Africa
- Xerophaeus druryi Tucker, 1923 — South Africa
- Xerophaeus espoir Platnick, 1981 — Seychelles
- Xerophaeus exiguus Purcell, 1907 — South Africa
- Xerophaeus flammeus Tucker, 1923 — South Africa
- Xerophaeus flavescens Purcell, 1907 — South Africa
- Xerophaeus hottentottus Purcell, 1908 — South Africa
- Xerophaeus kiwuensis Strand, 1913 — Central Africa
- Xerophaeus lightfooti Purcell, 1907 — South Africa
- Xerophaeus longispina Purcell, 1908 — South Africa
- Xerophaeus lunulifer Purcell, 1907 — South Africa
- Xerophaeus maritimus Lawrence, 1938 — South Africa
- Xerophaeus matroosbergensis Tucker, 1923 — South Africa
- Xerophaeus occiduus Tucker, 1923 — South Africa
- Xerophaeus oceanicus Schmidt & Jocqué, 1983 — Réunion
- Xerophaeus pallidus Tucker, 1923 — South Africa
- Xerophaeus patricki Purcell, 1907 — South Africa
- Xerophaeus perversus Purcell, 1923 — South Africa
- Xerophaeus phaseolus Tucker, 1923 — South Africa
- Xerophaeus robustus Lawrence, 1936 — South Africa
- Xerophaeus rostratus Purcell, 1907 — South Africa
- Xerophaeus ruandanus Strand, 1913 — Rwanda
- Xerophaeus rubeus Tucker, 1923 — South Africa
- Xerophaeus silvaticus Tucker, 1923 — South Africa
- Xerophaeus spiralifer Purcell, 1907 — South Africa
- Xerophaeus spoliator Purcell, 1907 — South Africa
- Xerophaeus tenebrosus Tucker, 1923 — South Africa
- Xerophaeus thomasi (Caporiacco, 1949) — Kenya
- Xerophaeus vickermani Tucker, 1923 — South Africa
- Xerophaeus zuluensis Lawrence, 1938 — South Africa

=== Xizangia ===
Xizangia Song, Zhu & Zhang, 2004

- Xizangia linzhiensis (Hu, 2001) (type) — China
- Xizangia rigaze Song, Zhu & Zhang, 2004 — China

== Z ==
=== Zelanda ===
Zelanda Özdikmen, 2009

- Zelanda elongata (Forster, 1979) — New Zealand
- Zelanda erebus (L. Koch, 1873) (type) — New Zealand
- Zelanda kaituna (Forster, 1979) — New Zealand
- Zelanda miranda (Forster, 1979) — New Zealand
- Zelanda obtusa (Forster, 1979) — New Zealand
- Zelanda titirangia (Ovtsharenko, Fedoryak & Zakharov, 2006) — New Zealand

=== Zelominor ===
Zelominor Snazell & Murphy, 1997

- Zelominor algarvensis Snazell & Murphy, 1997 — Portugal, Spain
- Zelominor algericus Snazell & Murphy, 1997 — Algeria
- Zelominor malagensis Snazell & Murphy, 1997 (type) — Spain

=== Zelotes ===
Zelotes

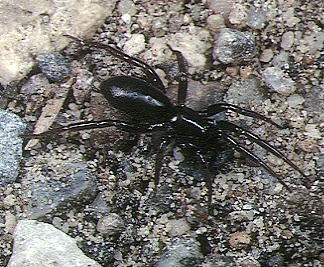
Zelotes flexuosus, female

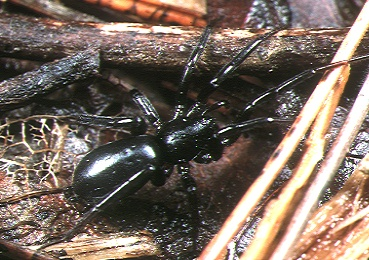
Zelotes iriomotensis, female

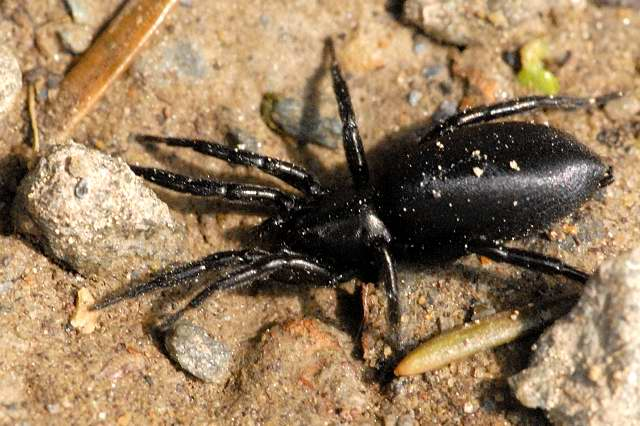
Zelotes latreillei

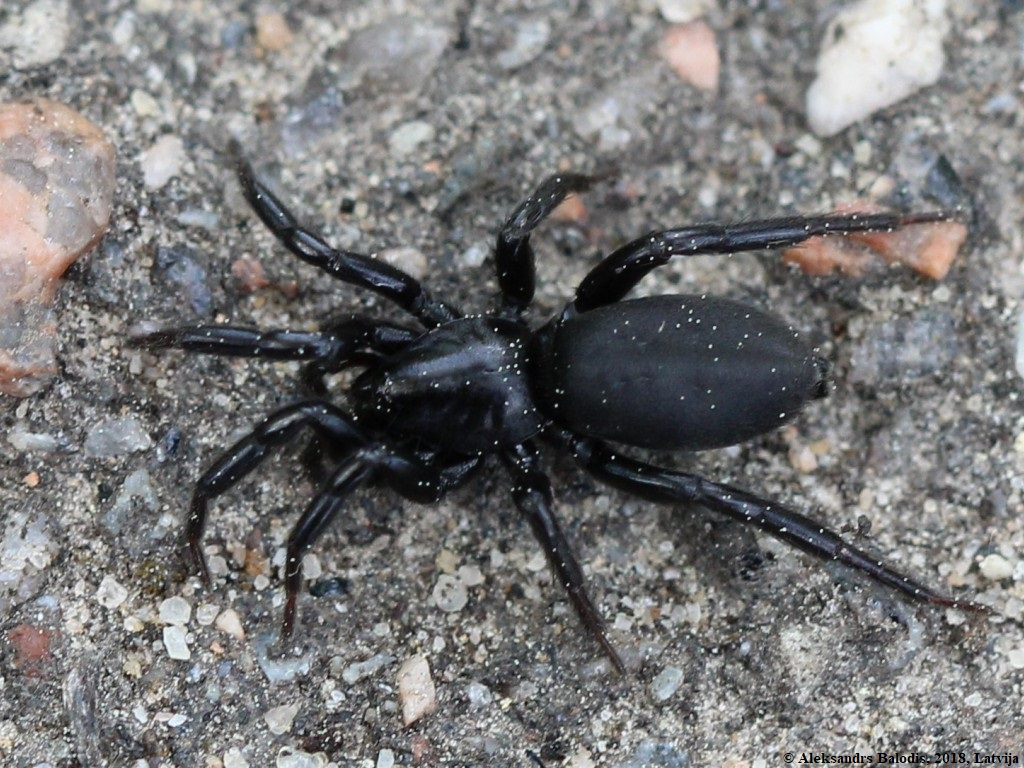
Zelotes pusillus

Zelotes Gistel, 1848

- Zelotes abdurakhmanovi Ponomarev, 2018 — Kazakhstan
- Zelotes acapulcoanus Gertsch & Davis, 1940 — Mexico
- Zelotes acarnanicus Lissner & Chatzaki, 2018 — Greece
- Zelotes adderet Levy, 2009 — Israel
- Zelotes aeneus (Simon, 1878) — Madeira, Europe, Azerbaijan
- Zelotes aerosus Charitonov, 1946 — Greece (Crete), Central Asia
- Zelotes aestus (Tucker, 1923) — Namibia
- Zelotes aiken Platnick & Shadab, 1983 — USA
- Zelotes albanicus (Hewitt, 1915) — South Africa
- Zelotes albomaculatus (O. Pickard-Cambridge, 1901) — South Africa
- Zelotes alpujarraensis Senglet, 2011 — Spain
- Zelotes altissimus Hu, 1989 — China
- Zelotes anchoralis Denis, 1958 — Afghanistan
- Zelotes andreinii Reimoser, 1937 — Ethiopia, Uganda
- Zelotes anglo Gertsch & Riechert, 1976 — USA, Mexico
- Zelotes angolensis FitzPatrick, 2007 — Angola
- Zelotes annamarieae Lissner, 2017 — Canary Is.
- Zelotes anthereus Chamberlin, 1936 — USA
- Zelotes apricorum (L. Koch, 1876) — Europe, Turkey, Kazakhstan
- Zelotes argoliensis (C. L. Koch, 1839) — Greece
- Zelotes aridus (Purcell, 1907) — Tanzania, Namibia, South Africa
- Zelotes arnoldii Charitonov, 1946 — Central Asia
- Zelotes ashae Tikader & Gajbe, 1976 — India
- Zelotes asiaticus (Bösenberg & Strand, 1906) — Russia (Far East), China, Korea, Japan
- Zelotes atlanticus (Simon, 1909) — Morocco
- Zelotes atrocaeruleus (Simon, 1878) — Europe, Turkey, Caucasus, Russia (Europe) to Central Asia, China
- Zelotes aurantiacus Miller, 1967 — Central to eastern Europe, Turkey
- Zelotes azsheganovae Esyunin & Efimik, 1992 — Ukraine, Russia (Europe to south Siberia), Kazakhstan
- Zelotes babunaensis (Drensky, 1929) — Greece
- Zelotes baeticus Senglet, 2011 — Spain
- Zelotes bajo Platnick & Shadab, 1983 — Mexico
- Zelotes balcanicus Deltshev, 2006 — Italy, Bulgaria, Romania, Greece, Macedonia, Israel
- Zelotes baltistanus Caporiacco, 1934 — Pakistan, Russia (south and northeastern Siberia), Mongolia
- Zelotes baltoroi Caporiacco, 1934 — India, Karakorum
- Zelotes bambari FitzPatrick, 2007 — Central African Rep.
- Zelotes banana FitzPatrick, 2007 — Congo
- Zelotes barbarus (Simon, 1885) — Morocco, Algeria, Tunisia
- Zelotes barkol Platnick & Song, 1986 — Russia (south Siberia), China
- Zelotes bashaneus Levy, 1998 — Israel
- Zelotes bassari FitzPatrick, 2007 — Togo
- Zelotes bastardi (Simon, 1896) — Zimbabwe, South Africa, Madagascar
- Zelotes beijianensis Hu & Wu, 1989 — China
- Zelotes berytensis (Simon, 1884) — Syria
- Zelotes bharatae Gajbe, 2005 — India
- Zelotes bicolor Hu & Wu, 1989 — China
- Zelotes bifukaensis Kamura, 2000 — Japan
- Zelotes bifurcutis Zhang, Zhu & Tso, 2009 — Taiwan
- Zelotes bimaculatus (C. L. Koch, 1837) — Hungary, Greece, Russia (Europe)
- Zelotes birmanicus (Simon, 1884) — Myanmar
- Zelotes bokerensis Levy, 1998 — Israel
- Zelotes boluensis Wunderlich, 2011 — Turkey
- Zelotes bozbalus Roewer, 1961 — Afghanistan
- Zelotes brennanorum FitzPatrick, 2007 — Malawi, Zimbabwe
- Zelotes broomi (Purcell, 1907) — South Africa
- Zelotes butarensis FitzPatrick, 2007 — West, Central Africa
- Zelotes butembo FitzPatrick, 2007 — Congo
- Zelotes calactinus Di Franco, 1989 — Italy
- Zelotes caldarius (Purcell, 1907) — South Africa
- Zelotes callidus (Simon, 1878) — Spain (mainland, Menorca), France, Italy, Morocco
- Zelotes cantonensis Platnick & Song, 1986 — China
- Zelotes capensis FitzPatrick, 2007 — South Africa
- Zelotes capiliae Barrion & Litsinger, 1995 — Philippines
- Zelotes caprearum (Pavesi, 1875) — Italy
- Zelotes caprivi FitzPatrick, 2007 — Namibia
- Zelotes capsula Tucker, 1923 — South Africa
- Zelotes caracasanus (Simon, 1893) — Venezuela
- Zelotes caspius Ponomarev & Tsvetkov, 2006 — Kazakhstan
- Zelotes cassinensis FitzPatrick, 2007 — Guinea-Bissau
- Zelotes catholicus Chamberlin, 1924 — Mexico
- Zelotes cayucos Platnick & Shadab, 1983 — USA
- Zelotes chandosiensis Tikader & Gajbe, 1976 — India
- Zelotes chaniaensis Senglet, 2011 — Greece (Crete), Iran?
- Zelotes chinguli FitzPatrick, 2007 — Botswana, Zimbabwe
- Zelotes chotorus Roewer, 1961 — Afghanistan
- Zelotes choubeyi Tikader & Gajbe, 1979 — India
- Zelotes cingarus (O. Pickard-Cambridge, 1874) — Macedonia, Bulgaria, Greece, Turkey, Tajikistan
- Zelotes clivicola (L. Koch, 1870) — Europe, Turkey, Russia (Europe to south Siberia), Kazakhstan
- Zelotes coeruleus (Holmberg, 1876) — Argentina
- Zelotes comparilis (Simon, 1886) — Senegal, Burkina Faso
- Zelotes cordiger (L. Koch, 1875) — Ethiopia
- Zelotes cordubensis Senglet, 2011 — Spain
- Zelotes cornipalpus Melic, Silva & Barrientos, 2016 — Portugal, Spain
- Zelotes corrugatus (Purcell, 1907) — Southern Africa
- Zelotes creticus (Kulczyński, 1903) — Greece (Crete)
- Zelotes criniger Denis, 1937 — Mediterranean
- Zelotes cruz Platnick & Shadab, 1983 — USA
- Zelotes cyanescens Simon, 1914 — France
- Zelotes daidalus Chatzaki, 2003 — Greece (Crete)
- Zelotes davidi (Simon, 1884) — Libya, Syria
- Zelotes davidi Schenkel, 1963 — China, Korea, Japan
- Zelotes denapes Platnick, 1993 — Italy
- Zelotes desioi Caporiacco, 1934 — India
- Zelotes devotus Grimm, 1982 — Alps (France, Switzerland, Austria, Italy)
- Zelotes discens Chamberlin, 1922 — USA
- Zelotes distinctissimus Caporiacco, 1929 — Greece
- Zelotes doddieburni FitzPatrick, 2007 — Zimbabwe, South Africa
- Zelotes donan Kamura, 1999 — Japan (Ryukyu Is.)
- Zelotes donnanae FitzPatrick, 2007 — Congo
- Zelotes duplex Chamberlin, 1922 — USA, Canada
- Zelotes egregioides Senglet, 2011 — Portugal, Spain, France
- Zelotes egregius Simon, 1914 — Spain (Balearic Is.), Andorra, France, Italy
- Zelotes electus (C. L. Koch, 1839) — Europe, Turkey, Caucasus, Russia (Europe to south Siberia), Central Asia
- Zelotes erebeus (Thorell, 1871) — Europe, Turkey
- Zelotes eremus Levy, 1998 — Israel
- Zelotes ernsti (Simon, 1893) — Venezuela
- Zelotes erythrocephalus (Lucas, 1846) — Algeria
- Zelotes eskovi Zhang & Song, 2001 — China
- Zelotes eugenei Kovblyuk, 2009 — Greece, Ukraine, Russia (Europe, Caucasus)
- Zelotes exiguoides Platnick & Shadab, 1983 — USA, Canada
- Zelotes exiguus (Müller & Schenkel, 1895) — Europe, Turkey, Russia (Europe to Far East), China, Korea, Japan
- Zelotes fagei Denis, 1955 — Niger, Egypt
- Zelotes faisalabadensis Butt & Beg, 2004 — Pakistan
- Zelotes fallax Tuneva & Esyunin, 2003 — Russia (Europe), Kazakhstan
- Zelotes femellus (L. Koch, 1866) — Southern Europe
- Zelotes flabellis Zhang, Zhu & Tso, 2009 — Taiwan
- Zelotes flagellans (L. Koch, 1882) — Spain (mainland, Balearic Is.)
- Zelotes flavens (L. Koch, 1873) — Australia (Western Australia)
- Zelotes flavimanus (C. L. Koch, 1839) — Greece
- Zelotes flavitarsis (Purcell, 1908) — South Africa
- Zelotes flexuosus Kamura, 1999 — Japan (Ryukyu Is.)
- Zelotes florisbad FitzPatrick, 2007 — South Africa
- Zelotes florodes Platnick & Shadab, 1983 — USA
- Zelotes foresta Platnick & Shadab, 1983 — USA
- Zelotes fratris Chamberlin, 1920 — Russia (middle Siberia to Far East), North America
- Zelotes frenchi Tucker, 1923 — Botswana, Zimbabwe, South Africa
- Zelotes fuligineus (Purcell, 1907) — Central, East, Southern Africa
- Zelotes fulvaster (Simon, 1878) — France (Corsica), Macedonia, Greece
- Zelotes fulvopilosus (Simon, 1878) — Spain (mainland, Balearic Is.), France
- Zelotes funestus (Keyserling, 1887) — USA
- Zelotes fuscimanus (Kroneberg, 1875) — Uzbekistan
- Zelotes fuscorufus (Simon, 1878) — Spain, France (Corsica), Italy
- Zelotes fuscus (Thorell, 1875) — Ukraine, Kazakhstan
- Zelotes fuzeta Wunderlich, 2011 — Portugal
- Zelotes gabriel Platnick & Shadab, 1983 — USA
- Zelotes gallicus Simon, 1914 — Europe, Kazakhstan
- Zelotes galunae Levy, 1998 — Israel
- Zelotes gattefossei Denis, 1952 — Morocco
- Zelotes gertschi Platnick & Shadab, 1983 — USA, Mexico
- Zelotes geshur Levy, 2009 — Israel
- Zelotes gladius Kamura, 1999 — Japan (Ryukyu Is.)
- Zelotes golanensis Levy, 2009 — Israel
- Zelotes gooldi (Purcell, 1907) — Namibia, South Africa
- Zelotes graecus (L. Koch, 1867) — Greece
- Zelotes griswoldi Platnick & Shadab, 1983 — USA
- Zelotes grovus Platnick & Shadab, 1983 — USA
- Zelotes guineanus (Simon, 1907) — West, Central, East Africa
- Zelotes gussakovskyi Charitonov, 1951 — Tajikistan
- Zelotes gynethus Chamberlin, 1919 — USA
- Zelotes haifaensis Levy, 2009 — Israel
- Zelotes hanangensis FitzPatrick, 2007 — Tanzania
- Zelotes haplodrassoides (Denis, 1955) — Niger, Ethiopia
- Zelotes hardwar Platnick & Shadab, 1983 — Jamaica
- Zelotes harmeron Levy, 2009 — Greece, Turkey, Israel
- Zelotes haroni FitzPatrick, 2007 — Zimbabwe, Malawi
- Zelotes hayashii Kamura, 1987 — Japan
- Zelotes helanshan Tang, Urita, Song & Zhao, 1997 — Russia (Altai), China
- Zelotes helicoides Chatzaki, 2010 — Greece (Crete)
- Zelotes helsdingeni Zhang & Song, 2001 — China
- Zelotes henderickxi Bosselaers, 2012 — Canary Is.
- Zelotes hentzi Barrows, 1945 — USA, Canada
- Zelotes hermani (Chyzer, 1897) — Central Europe to Russia (Europe, Caucasus)
- Zelotes hirtus (Thorell, 1875) — France
- Zelotes hispaliensis Senglet, 2011 — Spain
- Zelotes holguin Alayón, 1992 — Cuba
- Zelotes hospitus (Simon, 1897) — India
- Zelotes hui Platnick & Song, 1986 — Kazakhstan, China
- Zelotes humilis (Purcell, 1907) — Zimbabwe, South Africa
- Zelotes hummeli Schenkel, 1936 — Kazakhstan, China
- Zelotes ibayensis FitzPatrick, 2007 — Tanzania
- Zelotes icenoglei Platnick & Shadab, 1983 — USA
- Zelotes illustris Butt & Beg, 2004 — Pakistan
- Zelotes incertissimus Caporiacco, 1934 — Libya
- Zelotes inderensis Ponomarev & Tsvetkov, 2006 — Kazakhstan
- Zelotes inglenook Platnick & Shadab, 1983 — USA
- Zelotes inqayi FitzPatrick, 2007 — Congo
- Zelotes insulanus (L. Koch, 1867) — Greece
- Zelotes insulanus Dalmas, 1922 — Italy
- Zelotes invidus (Purcell, 1907) — Namibia, South Africa
- Zelotes iriomotensis Kamura, 1994 — Japan
- Zelotes itandae FitzPatrick, 2007 — Congo
- Zelotes ivieorum Platnick & Shadab, 1983 — Mexico
- Zelotes jabalpurensis Tikader & Gajbe, 1976 — India
- Zelotes jamaicensis Platnick & Shadab, 1983 — Jamaica
- Zelotes jocquei FitzPatrick, 2007 — Kenya
- Zelotes josephine Platnick & Shadab, 1983 — USA
- Zelotes katombora FitzPatrick, 2007 — Zimbabwe
- Zelotes kazachstanicus Ponomarev & Tsvetkov, 2006 — Kazakhstan
- Zelotes kerimi (Pavesi, 1880) — Tunisia
- Zelotes keumjeungsanensis Paik, 1986 — China, Korea
- Zelotes khostensis Kovblyuk & Ponomarev, 2008 — Italy, Caucasus (Russia, Georgia)
- Zelotes kimi Paik, 1992 — Korea
- Zelotes kimwha Paik, 1986 — Korea, Japan
- Zelotes konarus Roewer, 1961 — Afghanistan
- Zelotes kulempikus FitzPatrick, 2007 — Kenya
- Zelotes kulukhunus FitzPatrick, 2007 — Burkina Faso, Chad
- Zelotes kumazomba FitzPatrick, 2007 — Malawi
- Zelotes kuncinyanus FitzPatrick, 2007 — South Africa
- Zelotes kuntzi Denis, 1953 — Yemen
- Zelotes kusumae Tikader, 1982 — India
- Zelotes laccus (Barrows, 1919) — USA, Canada
- Zelotes laconicus Senglet, 2011 — Greece
- Zelotes laetus (O. Pickard-Cambridge, 1872) — North Africa to Senegal and Kenya, Portugal, France, Israel, Saudi Arabia. Introduced to Hawaii, USA, Mexico, Peru
- Zelotes laghmanus Roewer, 1961 — Afghanistan
- Zelotes lagrecai Di Franco, 1994 — Portugal, Spain, Morocco
- Zelotes lasalanus Chamberlin, 1928 — North America
- Zelotes latreillei (Simon, 1878) — Europe, Turkey, Caucasus, Russia (Europe to south Siberia), Kazakhstan
- Zelotes lavus Tucker, 1923 — Southern Africa
- Zelotes lehavim Levy, 2009 — Israel
- Zelotes liaoi Platnick & Song, 1986 — China, Taiwan
- Zelotes lichenyensis FitzPatrick, 2007 — Malawi
- Zelotes lightfooti (Purcell, 1907) — South Africa
- Zelotes limnatis Chatzaki & Russell-Smith, 2017 — Cyprus
- Zelotes listeri (Audouin, 1826) — Egypt
- Zelotes lividus Mello-Leitão, 1943 — Argentina
- Zelotes longestylus Simon, 1914 — France
- Zelotes longinquus (L. Koch, 1866) — Algeria
- Zelotes longipes (L. Koch, 1866) — Europe, Turkey, Caucasus, Russia (Europe to Far East), Central Asia, Mongolia, China
- Zelotes lotzi FitzPatrick, 2007 — South Africa
- Zelotes lubumbashi FitzPatrick, 2007 — Congo
- Zelotes lutorius (Tullgren, 1910) — Tanzania
- Zelotes lymnophilus Chamberlin, 1936 — USA
- Zelotes maccaricus Di Franco, 1998 — Italy
- Zelotes maindroni (Simon, 1905) — India
- Zelotes mandae Tikader & Gajbe, 1979 — India
- Zelotes mandlaensis Tikader & Gajbe, 1976 — India
- Zelotes manius (Simon, 1878) — Southern Europe
- Zelotes manzae (Strand, 1908) — Canary Is.
- Zelotes mashonus FitzPatrick, 2007 — Congo, Botswana, Zimbabwe, South Africa
- Zelotes matobensis FitzPatrick, 2007 — Zimbabwe
- Zelotes mayanus Chamberlin & Ivie, 1938 — Mexico
- Zelotes mazumbai FitzPatrick, 2007 — Tanzania
- Zelotes mediocris (Kulczyński, 1901) — Ethiopia
- Zelotes meinsohni Denis, 1954 — Morocco
- Zelotes meronensis Levy, 1998 — Israel
- Zelotes mesa Platnick & Shadab, 1983 — USA, Mexico
- Zelotes messinai Di Franco, 1995 — Italy
- Zelotes metellus Roewer, 1928 — France, Albania, Greece to Iran, Israel, Russia (Europe)
- Zelotes mikhailovi Marusik, 1995 — Russia (Europe), Kazakhstan, Mongolia
- Zelotes minous Chatzaki, 2003 — Greece (Crete)
- Zelotes miramar Platnick & Shadab, 1983 — Mexico
- Zelotes mkomazi FitzPatrick, 2007 — Tanzania
- Zelotes moestus (O. Pickard-Cambridge, 1898) — Mexico
- Zelotes monachus Chamberlin, 1924 — USA, Mexico
- Zelotes monodens Chamberlin, 1936 — USA
- Zelotes mosioatunya FitzPatrick, 2007 — Botswana, Zambia, Zimbabwe
- Zelotes muizenbergensis FitzPatrick, 2007 — South Africa
- Zelotes mulanjensis FitzPatrick, 2007 — Malawi
- Zelotes mundus (Kulczyński, 1897) — Europe, Russia (Europe to south Siberia), Kazakhstan, China
- Zelotes murcidus Simon, 1914 — France
- Zelotes murphyorum FitzPatrick, 2007 — Kenya
- Zelotes musapi FitzPatrick, 2007 — Zimbabwe
- Zelotes nainitalensis Tikader & Gajbe, 1976 — India
- Zelotes naliniae Tikader & Gajbe, 1979 — India
- Zelotes namaquus FitzPatrick, 2007 — South Africa
- Zelotes namibensis FitzPatrick, 2007 — Namibia
- Zelotes nannodes Chamberlin, 1936 — USA
- Zelotes naphthalii Levy, 2009 — Israel
- Zelotes nasikensis Tikader & Gajbe, 1976 — India
- Zelotes natalensis Tucker, 1923 — South Africa
- Zelotes ngomensis FitzPatrick, 2007 — South Africa
- Zelotes nilgirinus Reimoser, 1934 — India
- Zelotes nishikawai Kamura, 2010 — Taiwan
- Zelotes nyathii FitzPatrick, 2007 — Congo, Botswana, Zimbabwe
- Zelotes oblongus (C. L. Koch, 1833) — Europe, Turkey
- Zelotes ocala Platnick & Shadab, 1983 — USA
- Zelotes occidentalis Melic, 2014 — Portugal, Spain
- Zelotes occultus Tuneva & Esyunin, 2003 — Russia (Europe, Urals)
- Zelotes olympi (Kulczyński, 1903) — Bulgaria, Ukraine, Turkey, Russia (Caucasus)
- Zelotes orenburgensis Tuneva & Esyunin, 2003 — Ukraine, Russia (Europe, Caucasus), Kazakhstan
- Zelotes oryx (Simon, 1880) — Morocco, Algeria
- Zelotes otavi FitzPatrick, 2007 — Namibia, Botswana
- Zelotes ovambensis Lawrence, 1927 — Namibia
- Zelotes ovtsharenkoi Zhang & Song, 2001 — China
- Zelotes pakistaniensis Butt & Beg, 2004 — Pakistan
- Zelotes pallidipes Tucker, 1923 — Namibia
- Zelotes paradderet Levy, 2009 — Israel
- Zelotes paraegregius Wunderlich, 2012 — Canary Is.
- Zelotes paranaensis Mello-Leitão, 1947 — Brazil
- Zelotes parascrutatus Levy, 1998 — Israel
- Zelotes paroculus Simon, 1914 — France, Italy
- Zelotes pediculatoides Senglet, 2011 — Spain
- Zelotes pediculatus Marinaro, 1967 — Algeria, Israel
- Zelotes pedimaculosus Tucker, 1923 — Namibia
- Zelotes perditus Chamberlin, 1922 — USA
- Zelotes petrensis (C. L. Koch, 1839) — Europe, Turkey, Caucasus, Russia (Europe to south Siberia), Central Asia
- Zelotes petrophilus Chamberlin, 1936 — USA
- Zelotes pexus (Simon, 1885) — India
- Zelotes piceus (Kroneberg, 1875) — Tajikistan
- Zelotes piercy Platnick & Shadab, 1983 — USA
- Zelotes pinos Platnick & Shadab, 1983 — USA
- Zelotes planiger Roewer, 1961 — Afghanistan
- Zelotes plumiger (L. Koch, 1882) — Spain (Majorca)
- Zelotes pluridentatus Marinaro, 1967 — Algeria
- Zelotes poecilochroaeformis Denis, 1937 — Algeria, Tunisia
- Zelotes poonaensis Tikader & Gajbe, 1976 — India
- Zelotes potanini Schenkel, 1963 — Russia (Urals to Far East), Kazakhstan, China, Korea, Japan
- Zelotes prishutovae Ponomarev & Tsvetkov, 2006 — Greece, Turkey, Ukraine, Russia (Europe)
- Zelotes pseudoapricorum Schenkel, 1963 — Kazakhstan, China
- Zelotes pseudogallicus Ponomarev, 2007 — Ukraine, Russia (Europe to west Siberia), Kazakhstan
- Zelotes pseudopusillus Caporiacco, 1934 — India
- Zelotes pseustes Chamberlin, 1922 — USA, Mexico
- Zelotes pulchellus Butt & Beg, 2004 — Pakistan
- Zelotes pulchripes (Purcell, 1908) — South Africa
- Zelotes pullus (Bryant, 1936) — USA
- Zelotes puritanus Chamberlin, 1922 — North America, Europe, Turkey, Russia (Europe to Far East), Kazakhstan
- Zelotes pyrenaeus Di Franco & Blick, 2003 — France
- Zelotes quadridentatus (Strand, 1906) — Tunisia
- Zelotes quipungo FitzPatrick, 2007 — Angola
- Zelotes qwabergensis FitzPatrick, 2007 — South Africa
- Zelotes radiatus Lawrence, 1928 — Southern Africa
- Zelotes rainier Platnick & Shadab, 1983 — USA
- Zelotes reduncus (Purcell, 1907) — South Africa
- Zelotes reimoseri Roewer, 1951 — France
- Zelotes remyi Denis, 1954 — Algeria
- Zelotes resolution FitzPatrick, 2007 — South Africa
- Zelotes rinske van Helsdingen, 2012 — Italy
- Zelotes rothschildi (Simon, 1909) — Ethiopia, Congo
- Zelotes rufi Esyunin & Efimik, 1997 — Russia (Urals), Kazakhstan
- Zelotes rugege FitzPatrick, 2007 — Congo, Rwanda
- Zelotes rungwensis FitzPatrick, 2007 — Tanzania
- Zelotes ryukyuensis Kamura, 1999 — Japan (Ryukyu Is.)
- Zelotes sajali Tikader & Gajbe, 1979 — India
- Zelotes sanmen Platnick & Song, 1986 — China
- Zelotes santos Platnick & Shadab, 1983 — Mexico
- Zelotes sarawakensis (Thorell, 1890) — Pakistan to Indonesia (Borneo) and Australia
- Zelotes sardus (Canestrini, 1873) — France, Italy
- Zelotes sataraensis Tikader & Gajbe, 1979 — India
- Zelotes sclateri Tucker, 1923 — South Africa, Lesotho
- Zelotes scrutatus (O. Pickard-Cambridge, 1872) — Canary Is., Africa to Central Asia
- Zelotes segrex (Simon, 1878) — Europe, Turkey, Caucasus, Russia (Europe) to Central Asia
- Zelotes serratus Wunderlich, 2011 — Portugal, Spain
- Zelotes shabae FitzPatrick, 2007 — Congo
- Zelotes shaked Levy, 1998 — Israel
- Zelotes shantae Tikader, 1982 — India
- Zelotes siculus (Simon, 1878) — Italy (Sicily)
- Zelotes similis (Kulczyński, 1887) — Italy, Central Europe to Turkey
- Zelotes sindi Caporiacco, 1934 — India, Pakistan
- Zelotes singroboensis Jézéquel, 1965 — Ivory Coast
- Zelotes siyabonga FitzPatrick, 2007 — Zimbabwe
- Zelotes skinnerensis Platnick & Prentice, 1999 — USA
- Zelotes somaliensis FitzPatrick, 2007 — Somalia
- Zelotes songus FitzPatrick, 2007 — South Africa
- Zelotes soulouensis FitzPatrick, 2007 — Burkina Faso
- Zelotes spadix (L. Koch, 1866) — Spain, Greece, North Africa
- Zelotes spilosus Yin, 2012 — China
- Zelotes spinulosus Denis, 1958 — Afghanistan
- Zelotes stolidus (Simon, 1880) — Algeria, Libya
- Zelotes strandi (Nosek, 1905) — Bulgaria, Turkey
- Zelotes subaeneus (Simon, 1886) — Senegal
- Zelotes subterraneus (C. L. Koch, 1833) (type) — Europe, Turkey, Caucasus, Russia (Europe to Far East), Central Asia, China
- Zelotes sula Lowrie & Gertsch, 1955 — Russia (Far East), North America
- Zelotes surekhae Tikader & Gajbe, 1976 — India
- Zelotes swelus FitzPatrick, 2007 — Congo
- Zelotes talpa Platnick & Shadab, 1983 — Mexico
- Zelotes talpinus (L. Koch, 1872) — Western to Central Europe, Italy
- Zelotes tambaramensis Caleb & Mathai, 2013 — India
- Zelotes tarsalis Fage, 1929 — North Africa
- Zelotes tendererus FitzPatrick, 2007 — Malawi, Zambia, Zimbabwe
- Zelotes tenuis (L. Koch, 1866) — Mediterranean and Central Europe to Russia (Caucasus), Iran. Introduced to Galapagos Is., USA
- Zelotes tetramamillatus (Caporiacco, 1947) — Tanzania
- Zelotes thorelli Simon, 1914 — Portugal, Spain, France
- Zelotes tongdao Yin, Bao & Zhang, 1999 — China
- Zelotes tortuosus Kamura, 1987 — Korea, Japan
- Zelotes tragicus (O. Pickard-Cambridge, 1872) — Chad, Ethiopia, Israel
- Zelotes trimaculatus Mello-Leitão, 1930 — Brazil
- Zelotes tristis (Thorell, 1871) — Sweden
- Zelotes tropicalis FitzPatrick, 2007 — West, Central Africa
- Zelotes tsaii Platnick & Song, 1986 — China
- Zelotes tuckeri Roewer, 1951 — East, Southern Africa
- Zelotes tulare Platnick & Shadab, 1983 — USA
- Zelotes tuobus Chamberlin, 1919 — USA, Canada
- Zelotes turanicus Charitonov, 1946 — Uzbekistan
- Zelotes turcicus Seyyar, Demir & Aktaş, 2010 — Turkey
- Zelotes ubicki Platnick & Shadab, 1983 — Mexico
- Zelotes uniformis Mello-Leitão, 1941 — Argentina
- Zelotes union Platnick & Shadab, 1983 — Mexico
- Zelotes univittatus (Simon, 1897) — India
- Zelotes uquathus FitzPatrick, 2007 — South Africa
- Zelotes uronesae Melic, 2014 — Spain
- Zelotes vespertinus (Thorell, 1875) — France, Italy, Bulgaria, Macedonia
- Zelotes vikela FitzPatrick, 2007 — Senegal
- Zelotes viola Platnick & Shadab, 1983 — USA
- Zelotes viveki Gajbe, 2005 — India
- Zelotes wallacei Melic, Silva & Barrientos, 2016 — Portugal, Spain
- Zelotes wuchangensis Schenkel, 1963 — China, Korea
- Zelotes wunderlichi Blick, 2017 — Turkey
- Zelotes xerophilus Levy, 1998 — Israel
- Zelotes xiaoi Yin, Bao & Zhang, 1999 — China
- Zelotes yani Yin, Bao & Zhang, 1999 — China
- Zelotes yinae Platnick & Song, 1986 — China
- Zelotes yogeshi Gajbe, 2005 — India
- Zelotes yosemite Platnick & Shadab, 1983 — USA
- Zelotes zekharya Levy, 2009 — Cyprus, Israel, Iran
- Zelotes zellensis Grimm, 1982 — Germany, Austria
- Zelotes zephyrus Kamura, 1999 — Japan (Ryukyu Is.)
- Zelotes zhaoi Platnick & Song, 1986 — Russia (Far East), China
- Zelotes zhengi Platnick & Song, 1986 — China
- Zelotes zhui Yang & Tang, 2003 — China
- Zelotes zin Levy, 1998 — Israel
- Zelotes zonognathus (Purcell, 1907) — West, Central, Southern Africa

=== Zelotibia ===
Zelotibia

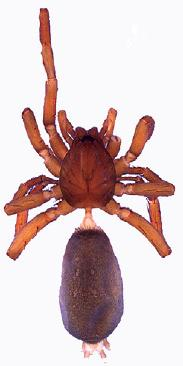
Zelotibia angelica, female

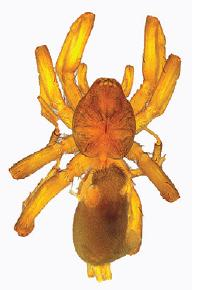
Zelotibia curvifemur, female

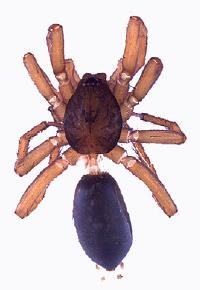
Zelotibia fosseyae, female

Zelotibia Russell-Smith & Murphy, 2005

- Zelotibia acicula Russell-Smith & Murphy, 2005 — Congo
- Zelotibia angelica Nzigidahera & Jocqué, 2009 — Burundi
- Zelotibia bicornuta Russell-Smith & Murphy, 2005 — Tanzania
- Zelotibia cultella Russell-Smith & Murphy, 2005 — Congo
- Zelotibia curvifemur Nzigidahera & Jocqué, 2009 — Burundi
- Zelotibia dolabra Russell-Smith & Murphy, 2005 — Congo
- Zelotibia filiformis Russell-Smith & Murphy, 2005 — Congo, Burundi
- Zelotibia flexuosa Russell-Smith & Murphy, 2005 — Congo, Rwanda
- Zelotibia fosseyae Nzigidahera & Jocqué, 2009 — Burundi
- Zelotibia johntony Nzigidahera & Jocqué, 2009 — Congo
- Zelotibia kaibos Russell-Smith & Murphy, 2005 — Kenya
- Zelotibia kanama Nzigidahera & Jocqué, 2009 — Rwanda
- Zelotibia kibira Nzigidahera & Jocqué, 2009 — Burundi
- Zelotibia lejeunei Nzigidahera & Jocqué, 2009 — Congo
- Zelotibia major Russell-Smith & Murphy, 2005 — Burundi
- Zelotibia mitella Russell-Smith & Murphy, 2005 (type) — Congo
- Zelotibia papillata Russell-Smith & Murphy, 2005 — Congo, Rwanda
- Zelotibia paucipapillata Russell-Smith & Murphy, 2005 — Congo, Burundi
- Zelotibia scobina Russell-Smith & Murphy, 2005 — Congo
- Zelotibia simpula Russell-Smith & Murphy, 2005 — Congo, Kenya
- Zelotibia subsessa Nzigidahera & Jocqué, 2009 — Burundi
- Zelotibia supercilia Russell-Smith & Murphy, 2005 — Congo

=== Zelowan ===
Zelowan Murphy & Russell-Smith, 2010

- Zelowan allegena Murphy & Russell-Smith, 2010 — Congo
- Zelowan bulbiformis Murphy & Russell-Smith, 2010 — Congo
- Zelowan cochleare Murphy & Russell-Smith, 2010 — Congo
- Zelowan cordiformis Murphy & Russell-Smith, 2010 — Congo
- Zelowan cuniculiformis Murphy & Russell-Smith, 2010 — Congo
- Zelowan ensifer Murphy & Russell-Smith, 2010 — Congo
- Zelowan etruricassis Murphy & Russell-Smith, 2010 — Congo
- Zelowan falciformis Murphy & Russell-Smith, 2010 — Congo
- Zelowan galea Murphy & Russell-Smith, 2010 — Congo
- Zelowan larva Murphy & Russell-Smith, 2010 — Congo
- Zelowan mammosa Murphy & Russell-Smith, 2010 — Congo
- Zelowan nodivulva Murphy & Russell-Smith, 2010 — Burundi
- Zelowan pyriformis Murphy & Russell-Smith, 2010 — Congo
- Zelowan remota Murphy & Russell-Smith, 2010 — Namibia
- Zelowan rostrata Murphy & Russell-Smith, 2010 — Congo
- Zelowan rotundipalpis Murphy & Russell-Smith, 2010 — Congo
- Zelowan similis Murphy & Russell-Smith, 2010 — Congo
- Zelowan spiculiformis Murphy & Russell-Smith, 2010 (type) — Congo

=== Zimirina ===
Zimirina Dalmas, 1919

- Zimirina brevipes Pérez & Blasco, 1986 — Spain, Italy (Sardinia)
- Zimirina cineris Cooke, 1964 — Canary Is.
- Zimirina deserticola Dalmas, 1919 — Algeria
- Zimirina gomerae (Schmidt, 1981) — Canary Is.
- Zimirina grancanariensis Wunderlich, 1992 — Canary Is.
- Zimirina hirsuta Cooke, 1964 — Canary Is.
- Zimirina lepida (Blackwall, 1859) — Madeira
- Zimirina moyaensis Wunderlich, 1992 — Canary Is.
- Zimirina nabavii Wunderlich, 2011 — Canary Is.
- Zimirina penicillata (Simon, 1893) (type) — Algeria
- Zimirina relegata Cooke, 1977 — St. Helena
- Zimirina spinicymbia Wunderlich, 1992 — Canary Is.
- Zimirina tenuidens Denis, 1956 — Morocco
- Zimirina transvaalica Dalmas, 1919 — South Africa
- Zimirina vastitatis Cooke, 1964 — Libya, Egypt

=== Zimiris ===
Zimiris Simon, 1882

- Zimiris diffusa Platnick & Penney, 2004 — Yemen (Socotra), India. Introduced to St. Helena
- Zimiris doriae Simon, 1882 (type) — Ivory Coast, Sudan, Eritrea, Yemen, Iran, India. Introduced to Mexico, Caribbean, French Guiana, Brazil, Germany, Indonesia (Java), Malaysia

=== Zimiromus ===
Zimiromus Banks, 1914

- Zimiromus aduncus Platnick & Shadab, 1976 — Panama
- Zimiromus atrifus Platnick & Höfer, 1990 — Brazil
- Zimiromus beni Platnick & Shadab, 1981 — Bolivia, Brazil
- Zimiromus bimini Platnick & Shadab, 1976 — Bahama Is.
- Zimiromus boistus Platnick & Höfer, 1990 — Brazil
- Zimiromus brachet Platnick & Shadab, 1976 — Ecuador
- Zimiromus buzios Brescovit & Buckup, 1998 — Brazil
- Zimiromus canje Platnick & Shadab, 1979 — Guyana
- Zimiromus chickeringi Platnick & Shadab, 1976 — Panama
- Zimiromus circulus Platnick & Shadab, 1976 — Peru
- Zimiromus dorado Platnick & Shadab, 1979 — Peru
- Zimiromus eberhardi Platnick & Shadab, 1976 — Colombia
- Zimiromus exlineae Platnick & Shadab, 1976 — Ecuador
- Zimiromus hortenciae Buckup & Brescovit, 1993 — Brazil
- Zimiromus iotus (Banks, 1929) — Panama
- Zimiromus jamaicensis Platnick & Shadab, 1976 — Jamaica
- Zimiromus kleini Buckup & Brescovit, 1993 — Brazil
- Zimiromus kochalkai Platnick & Shadab, 1976 — Colombia
- Zimiromus lawa Platnick & Shadab, 1981 — Suriname
- Zimiromus lingua Platnick & Shadab, 1976 — Mexico
- Zimiromus lubricus (Simon, 1893) — Venezuela, Trinidad
- Zimiromus malkini Platnick & Shadab, 1976 — Nicaragua
- Zimiromus medius (Keyserling, 1891) — Brazil
- Zimiromus montenegro Buckup & Brescovit, 1993 — Brazil
- Zimiromus muchmorei Platnick & Shadab, 1976 — Virgin Is.
- Zimiromus nadleri Platnick & Shadab, 1979 — Suriname
- Zimiromus penai Platnick & Shadab, 1976 — Ecuador
- Zimiromus piura Platnick & Shadab, 1976 — Peru
- Zimiromus platnicki Brescovit & Höfer, 1994 — Bolivia
- Zimiromus rabago Platnick & Shadab, 1976 — Colombia
- Zimiromus racamus Buckup & Brescovit, 1993 — Brazil
- Zimiromus recs Zapata & Grismado, 2012 — Argentina
- Zimiromus reichardti Platnick & Shadab, 1976 — Brazil
- Zimiromus rothi Platnick & Shadab, 1981 — Mexico
- Zimiromus sinop Platnick & Shadab, 1981 — Brazil, Argentina
- Zimiromus sununga Buckup & Brescovit, 1993 — Brazil
- Zimiromus syenus Buckup & Brescovit, 1993 — Brazil
- Zimiromus tapirape Brescovit & Buckup, 1998 — Brazil
- Zimiromus tonina Platnick & Shadab, 1976 — Mexico
- Zimiromus tropicalis (Banks, 1909) (type) — Costa Rica, Panama
- Zimiromus volksberg Platnick & Shadab, 1981 — Suriname
