= Micrargpelecopsis =

Scientific classification
- Kingdom: Animalia
- Phylum: Arthropoda
- Subphylum: Chelicerata
- Class: Arachnida
- Order: Araneae
- Infraorder: Araneomorphae
- Family: Linyphiidae
- Subfamily: Erigoninae
- Genus: Micrargpelecopsis; Wunderlich, 2025

Type species
- M. ascutata Wunderlich, 2025

Species
- 2, see text

Genus of spiders

Micrargpelecopsis is a genus of spiders in the family Linyphiidae.

== Distribution ==
Both species in Micrargpelecopsis are endemic to the Southeastern Algarve of Portugal.

== Description ==
In both described species, both sexes have a body length of about 1.5 mm.

== Etymology ==
The genus name is a combination of Linyphiid genera Micrargus and Pelecopsis, referring to the similarity to both.

== Species ==
As of January 2026, this genus includes two species:

- Micrargpelecopsis ascutata Wunderlich, 2026 – Portugal
- Micrargpelecopsis spinosa Wunderlich, 2026 – Portugal
