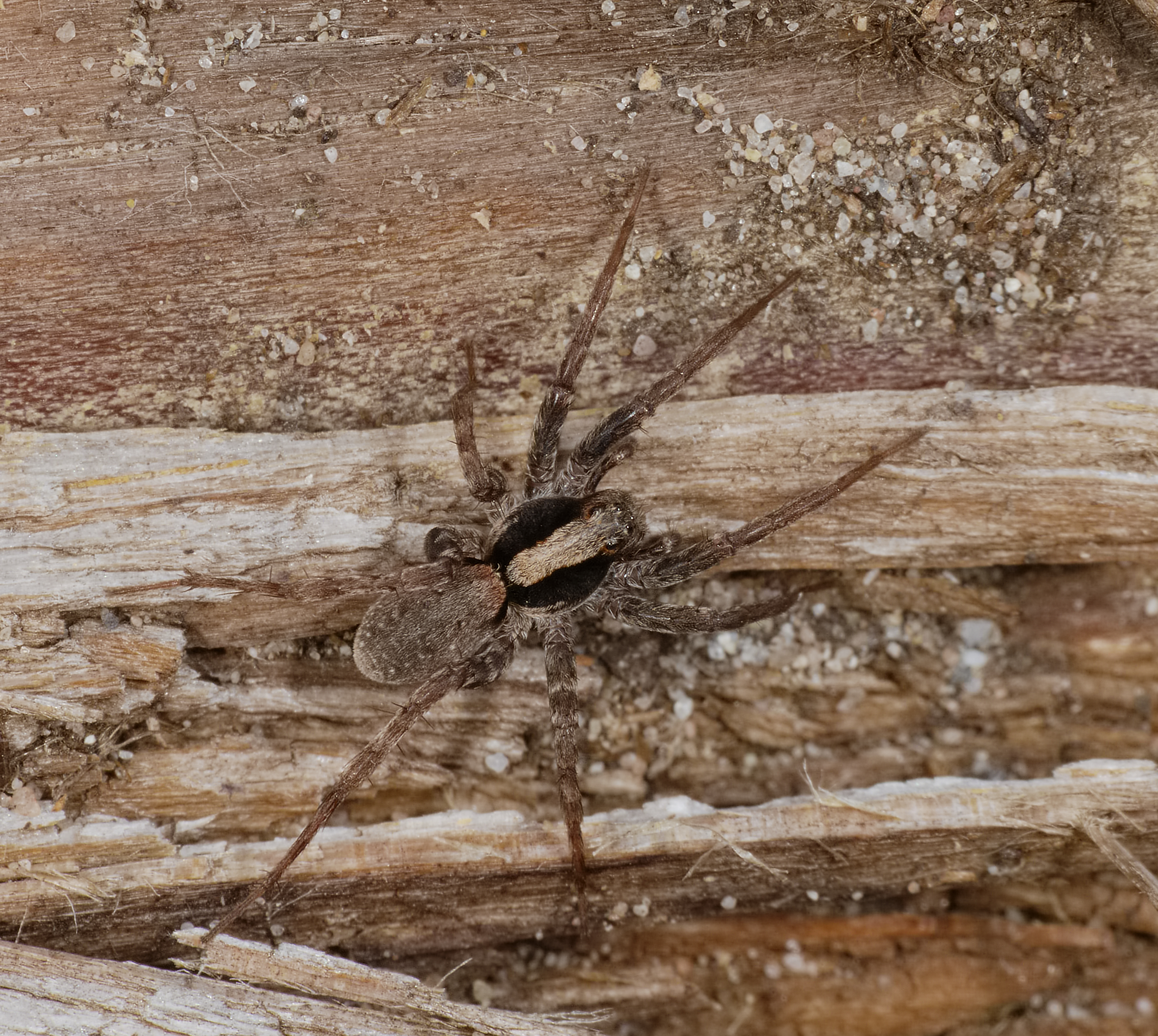
- Female

Scientific classification
- Kingdom: Animalia
- Phylum: Arthropoda
- Subphylum: Chelicerata
- Class: Arachnida
- Order: Araneae
- Infraorder: Araneomorphae
- Family: Lycosidae
- Genus: Xerolycosa
- Species: X. nemoralis

Binomial name
- Xerolycosa nemoralis (Westring, 1861)

Synonyms
- Lycosa nemoralis Westring, 1861; Tarentula nivalis (C. L. Koch, 1847); Tarentula nemoralis (Westring, 1861); Xerolycosa nemoralis (Westring, 1861); Tarentula flavitibia Saito, 1934; Saitocosa flavitibia (Saito, 1934)

= Xerolycosa nemoralis =

Species of spider

Xerolycosa nemoralis, or the burnt wolf spider, is a species of wolf spider found from western Europe eastwards to the Pacific.

== Description ==
The male has swollen palpal bulbs which are as long as they are wide at the base. The grooves on the genital shield are wider than they are long. The prosoma is brown, with a bright median stripe, which has parallel margins with white hair. The sternum is dark brown and the legs are a uniform dark brown, almost black. The opisthosoma is dark brown with a slightly darker cardiac spot.

The males are 4.5–5.7 millimetres (0.18–0.22 in) in length, the larger females 5–7.5 mm (0.20–0.30 in).

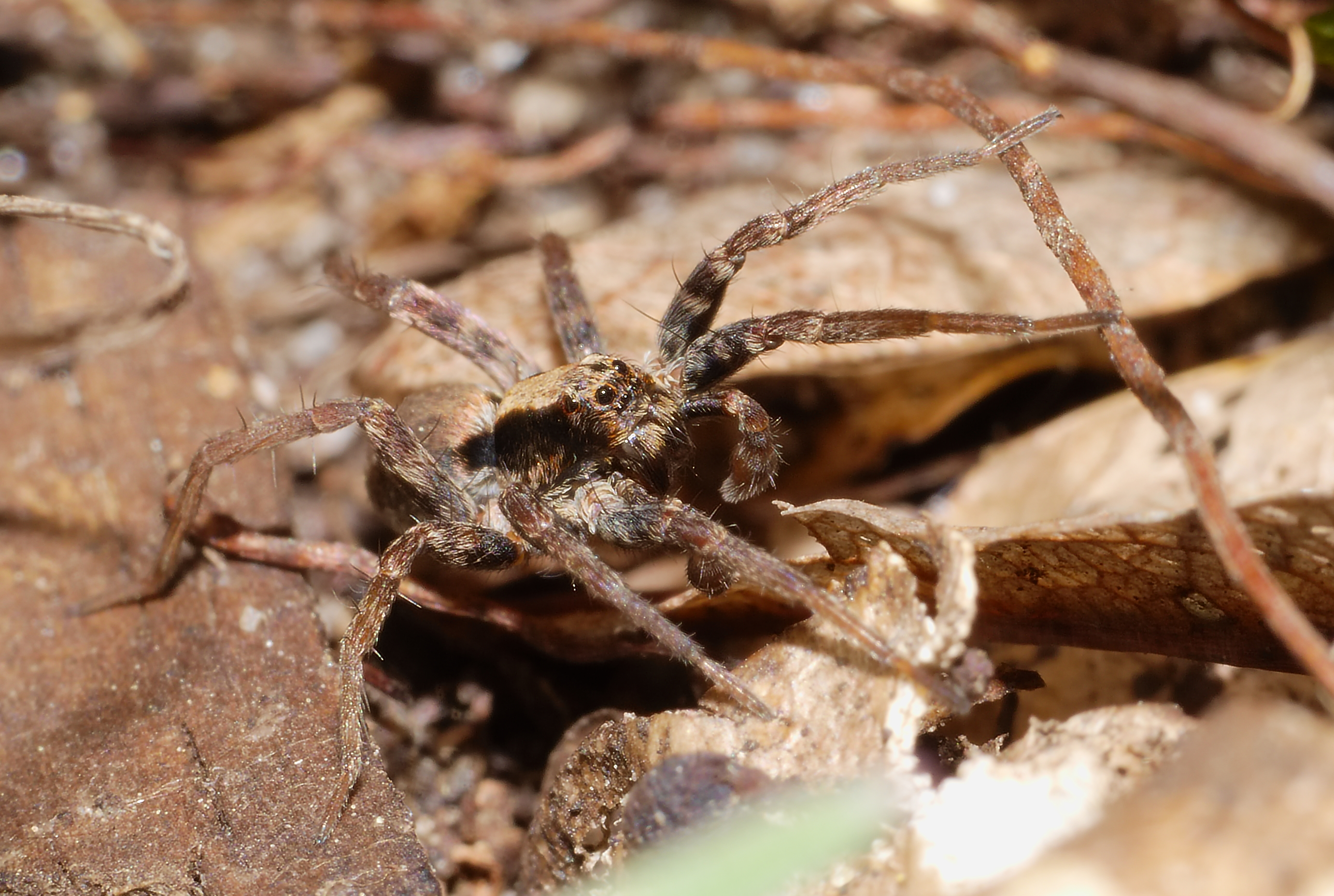
Male

== Habitat and ecology ==
The spider lives in dry litter and bark in sunny coppiced areas or clearings in woods, on stony chalk grassland with a short sward, on burnt heathland (up to approximately four years after the heath has been burnt) or bare patches of ground in older heathland. X. nemoralis has occurred in large numbers in sparsely vegetated man-made sites, such as railway ballast, almost to the exclusion of other wolf-spiders. In mainland Europe, it can be found on the sunny edges of coniferous forest up to 1800 m above sea level. Female Xerolycosa nemoralis are known to excavate shallow depressions in soil.

In Britain, X. nemoralis is active from late March through the summer to mid-September. The males emerge earlier than the females and the last specimens in Autumn are females.

== Distribution ==
X. nemoralis is widely distributed in Europe from south eastern England east to Russia. And across the Palearctic to Kamchatka and Honshu, south as far as Azerbaijan.
