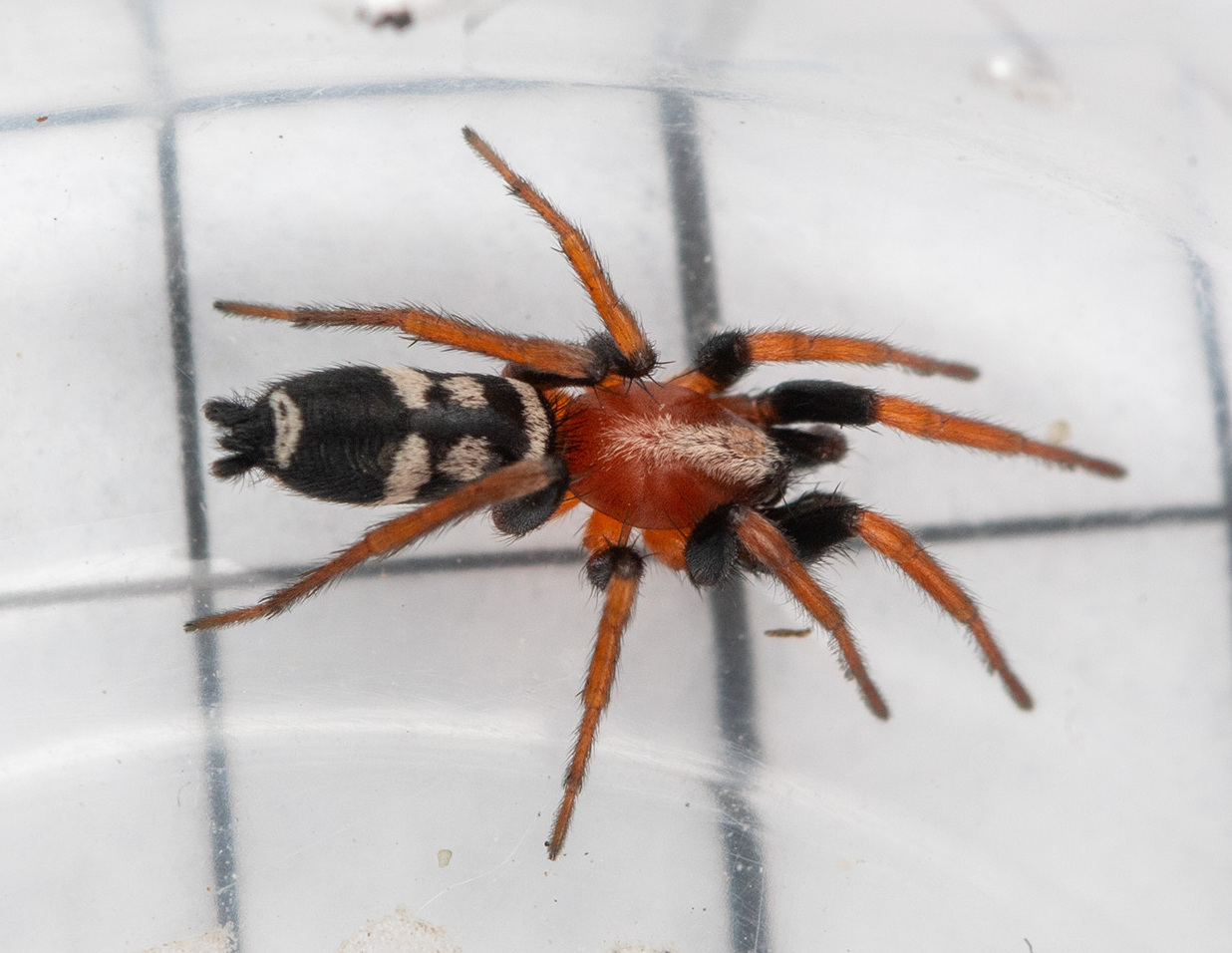
- P. variana
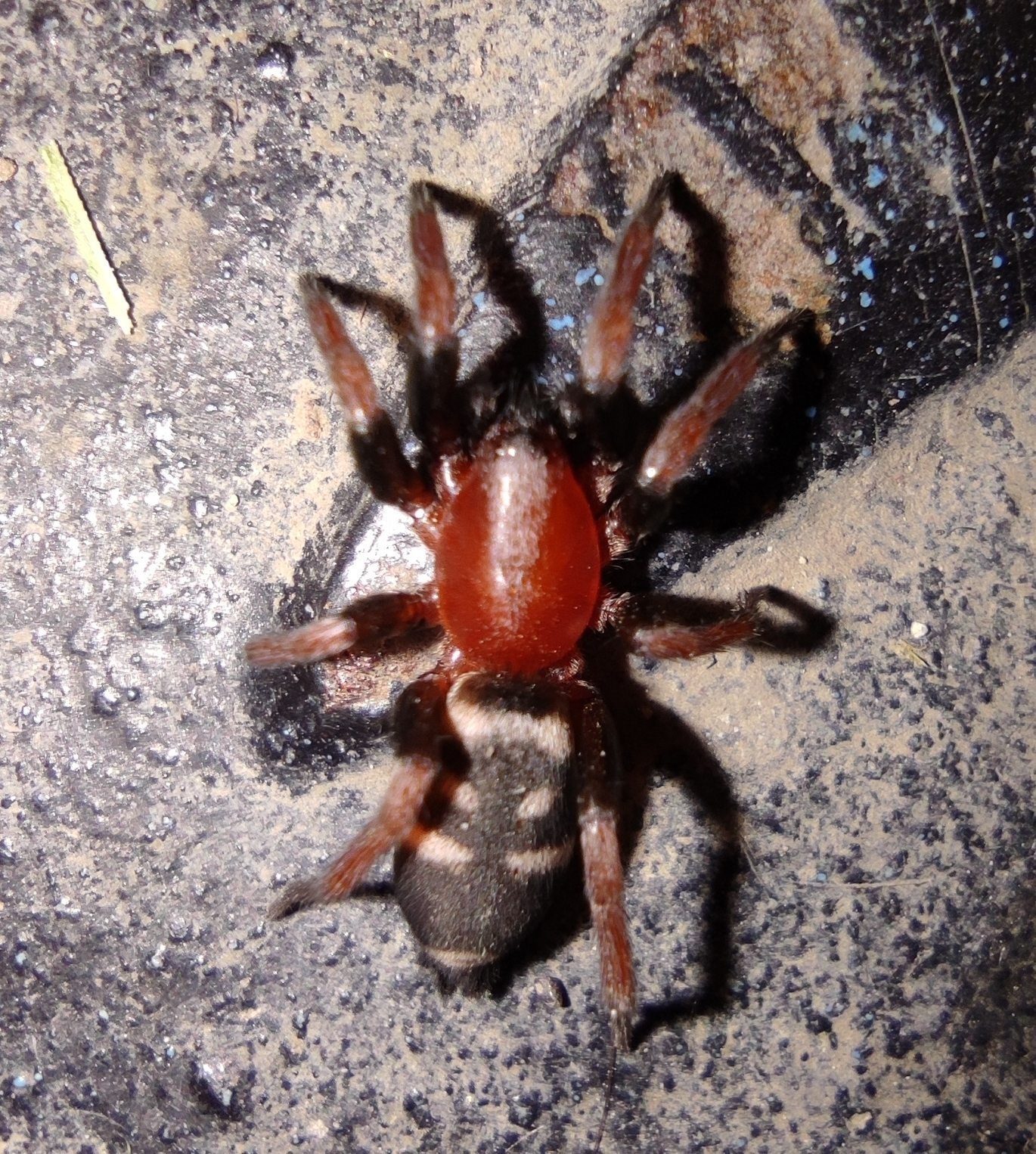
- P. variana

Scientific classification
- Kingdom: Animalia
- Phylum: Arthropoda
- Subphylum: Chelicerata
- Class: Arachnida
- Order: Araneae
- Infraorder: Araneomorphae
- Family: Gnaphosidae
- Genus: Poecilochroa; Westring, 1874

Type species
- P. variana (C. L. Koch, 1839)

Species
- 28, see text

= Poecilochroa =

Genus of spiders

Poecilochroa is a genus of ground spiders that was first described by Niklas Westring in 1874.

== Description ==
As Gnaphosidae, Poecilochroa have large cylindrical spinnerets. They are nocturnal, spending the day in silken retreats and going out at night to hunt.

Poecilochroa are divided into two gnaphosid groups based on their abdomen colouration: those with plain abdomens are in the Echemus group, while those with black and white abdomen are in the Herpyllus group. Males of both groups have well-developed dorsal scuta.

== Habitat ==
Poecilochroa occur in various habitats including on and under stones and dead leaves, on vegetation, in steppes, grasslands, dry fields, stream beds and forest floors.

== Species ==
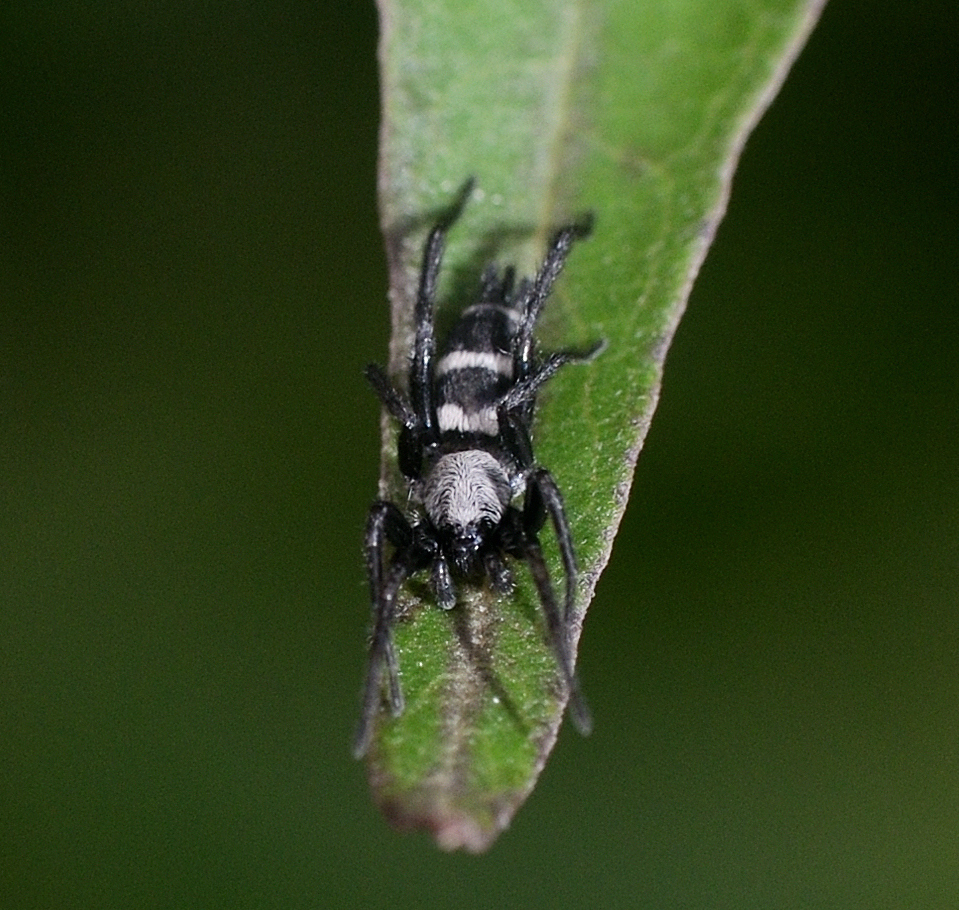
Poecilochroa sp. from Karnataka, India

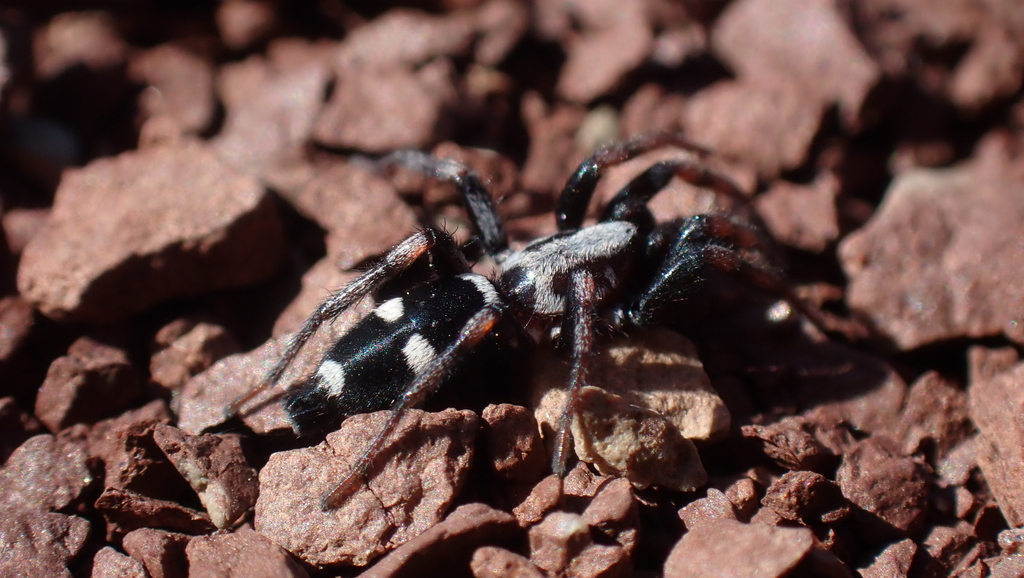
P. albomaculata

As of September 2025, this genus includes 28 species:

- Poecilochroa albomaculata (Lucas, 1846) – Portugal, Spain, France, Italy, Morocco, Algeria, Tunisia
- Poecilochroa alcala Barrion & Litsinger, 1995 – Philippines
- Poecilochroa anomala (Hewitt, 1915) – South Africa, Lesotho
- Poecilochroa barmani Tikader, 1982 – India
- Poecilochroa bifasciata Banks, 1902 – Galapagos
- Poecilochroa capensis Strand, 1909 – South Africa
- Poecilochroa carinata Caporiacco, 1947 – Uganda
- Poecilochroa dayamibrookiana Barrion & Litsinger, 1995 – Philippines
- Poecilochroa exoculata Lissner, 2024 – Canary Islands
- Poecilochroa faradjensis Lessert, 1929 – DR Congo
- Poecilochroa haplostyla Simon, 1907 – São Tomé and Príncipe
- Poecilochroa insularis Kulczyński, 1911 – Indonesia (Java)
- Poecilochroa involuta Tucker, 1923 – South Africa
- Poecilochroa joreungensis Paik, 1992 – Korea
- Poecilochroa khodiar (Patel, 1988) – India
- Poecilochroa kuljitae (Tikader, 1982) – India
- Poecilochroa latefasciata Simon, 1893 – Peru
- Poecilochroa parangunifasciata Barrion & Litsinger, 1995 – Philippines
- Poecilochroa patricia (Simon, 1878) – France (Corsica)
- Poecilochroa pauciaculeis Caporiacco, 1947 – Eritrea
- Poecilochroa phyllobia (Thorell, 1871) – Italy
- Poecilochroa rollini Berland, 1933 – French Polynesia (Marquesas Islands, Tuamotu)
- Poecilochroa taeguensis Paik, 1992 – Korea
- Poecilochroa tridotus Caleb & Mathai, 2013 – India
- Poecilochroa trifasciata Mello-Leitão, 1918 – Brazil
- Poecilochroa variana (C. L. Koch, 1839) – Europe, Central Asia (type species)
- Poecilochroa viduata (Pavesi, 1883) – Ethiopia
- Poecilochroa vittata Kulczyński, 1911 – Indonesia (Java)
