= Trichopternoides =

Scientific classification
- Kingdom: Animalia
- Phylum: Arthropoda
- Subphylum: Chelicerata
- Class: Arachnida
- Order: Araneae
- Infraorder: Araneomorphae
- Family: Linyphiidae
- Genus: Trichopternoides; Wunderlich, 2008
- Species: T. thorelli

Binomial name
- Trichopternoides thorelli (Westring, 1861)

Genus of spiders

Trichopternoides is a monotypic genus of European sheet weavers containing the single species, Trichopternoides thorelli. It was first described by J. Wunderlich in 2008, and is only found in Europe.
