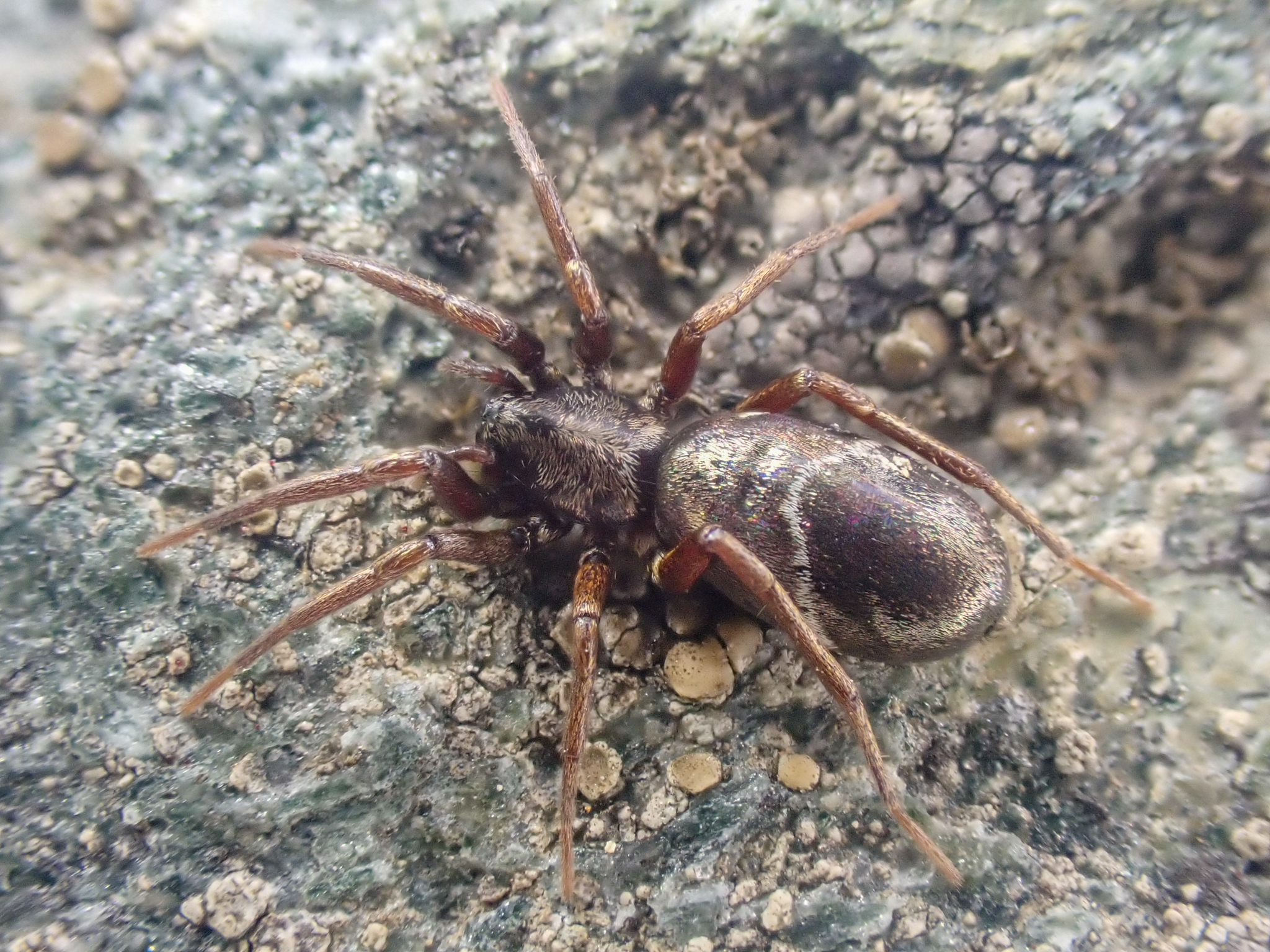
- female Micaria sp.
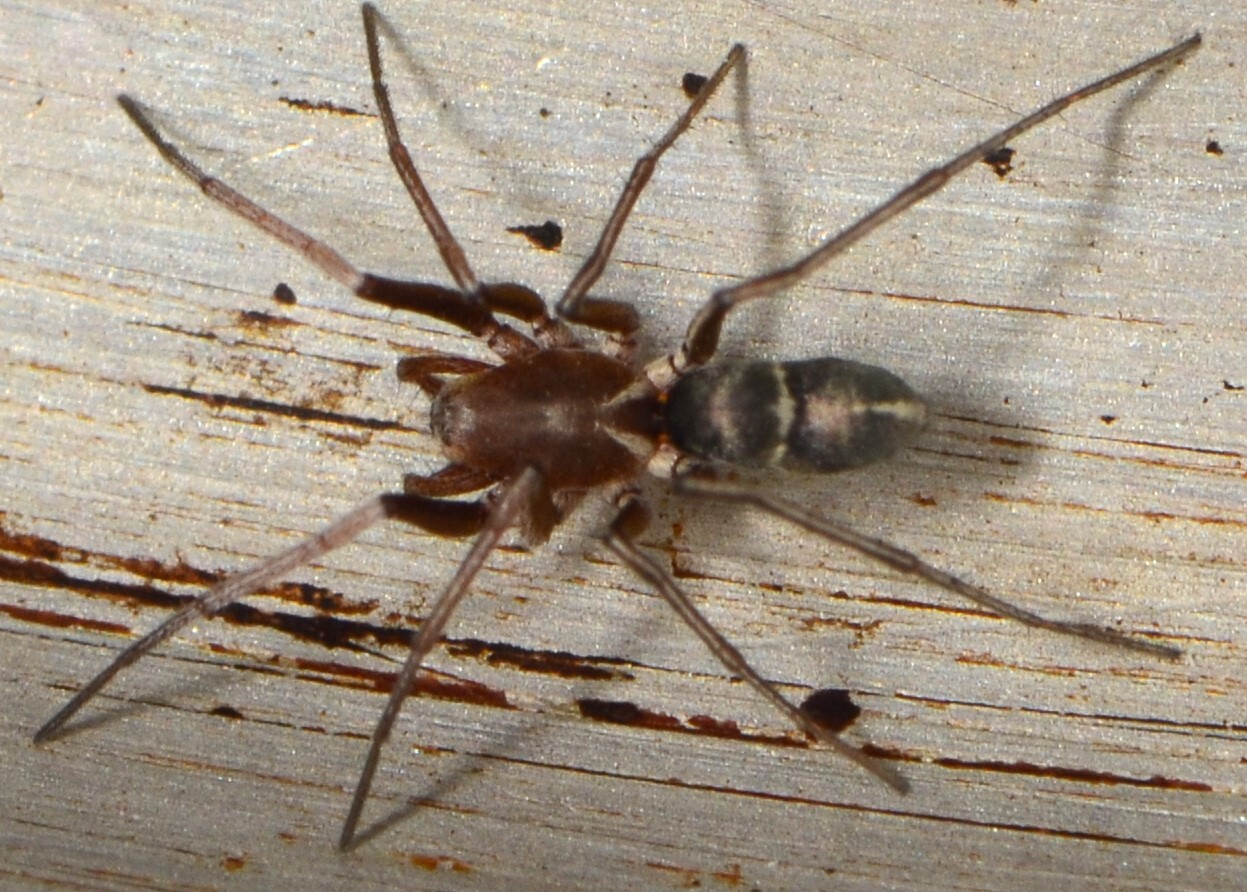
- male M. beaufortia

Scientific classification
- Kingdom: Animalia
- Phylum: Arthropoda
- Subphylum: Chelicerata
- Class: Arachnida
- Order: Araneae
- Infraorder: Araneomorphae
- Family: Gnaphosidae
- Genus: Micaria; Westring, 1851

Type species
- M. fulgens (Walckenaer, 1802)

Species
- 127, see text

Synonyms
- Arboricaria Bosmans, 2000; Castanilla Caporiacco, 1936; Epikurtomma Tucker, 1923>; Micariolepis Simon, 1879

= Micaria =

Micaria Temporal range: Palaeogene–present

Genus of spiders

Micaria is a genus of ground spiders that was first described by Niklas Westring in 1851. They are 1.3 to 6.5 millimetres (0.051 to 0.256 in) long.

They are often called "ant spiders" due to their ant-like appearance and ant mimicking behavior.

== Distribution ==
Spiders in this genus are found in the Holarctic, Indomalayan, Australasian and Afrotropical zoogeographic regions.

== Species ==
As of September 2025 the genus contains 127 species and two subspecies.

These species have articles on Wikipedia:

- Micaria beaufortia (Tucker, 1923) – Ethiopia, Namibia, Botswana, Zimbabwe, Mozambique, South Africa, Lesotho
- Micaria chrysis (Simon, 1910) – Ivory Coast, Ethiopia, Tanzania, Namibia, Mozambique, South Africa, Lesotho
- Micaria dives (Lucas, 1846) – Europe, North Africa, Turkey, Israel, Caucasus, Russia (Europe to Far East), Iran, Kazakhstan, Central Asia, Pakistan, India, China, Korea, Japan
- Micaria gertschi Barrows & Ivie, 1942 – Canada, United States
- Micaria longipes Emerton, 1890 – Canada, United States, Mexico
- Micaria longispina Emerton, 1911 – Canada, United States
- Micaria pasadena Platnick & Shadab, 1988 – United States, Mexico
- Micaria pulicaria (Sundevall, 1831) – Europe, Georgia, Russia (Europe to Far East), Kazakhstan, China, Japan, Alaska, Canada, United States
- Micaria rossica Thorell, 1875 – Alaska, Canada, United States, Europe, Turkey, Caucasus, Russia (Europe to Far East), Kazakhstan, Iran, Central Asia, Mongolia, China
- Micaria tersissima Simon, 1910 – South Africa
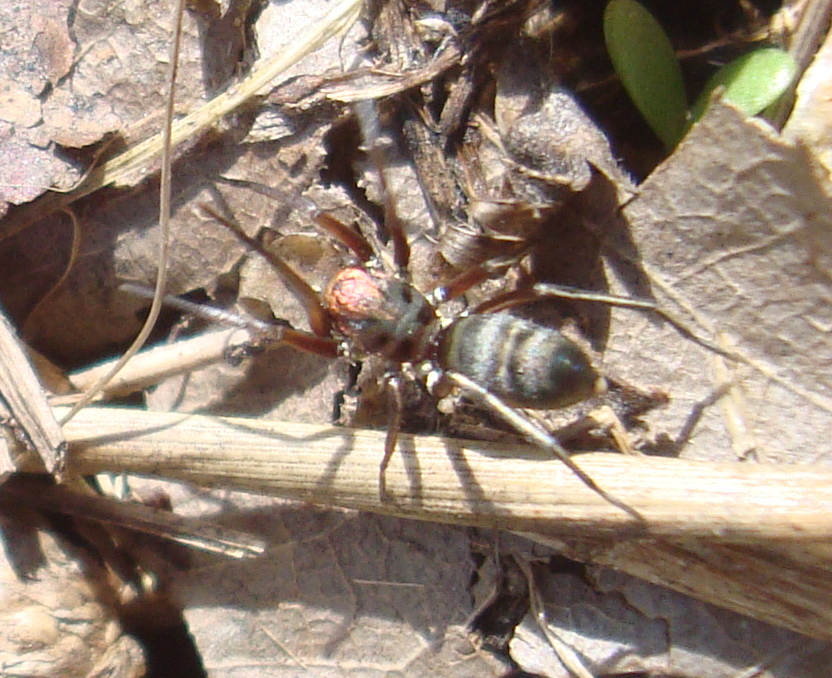
Micaria fulgens

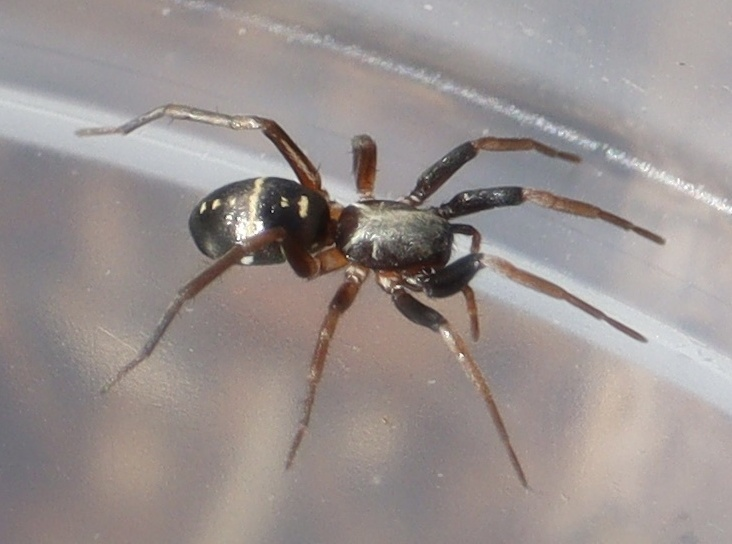
M. micans

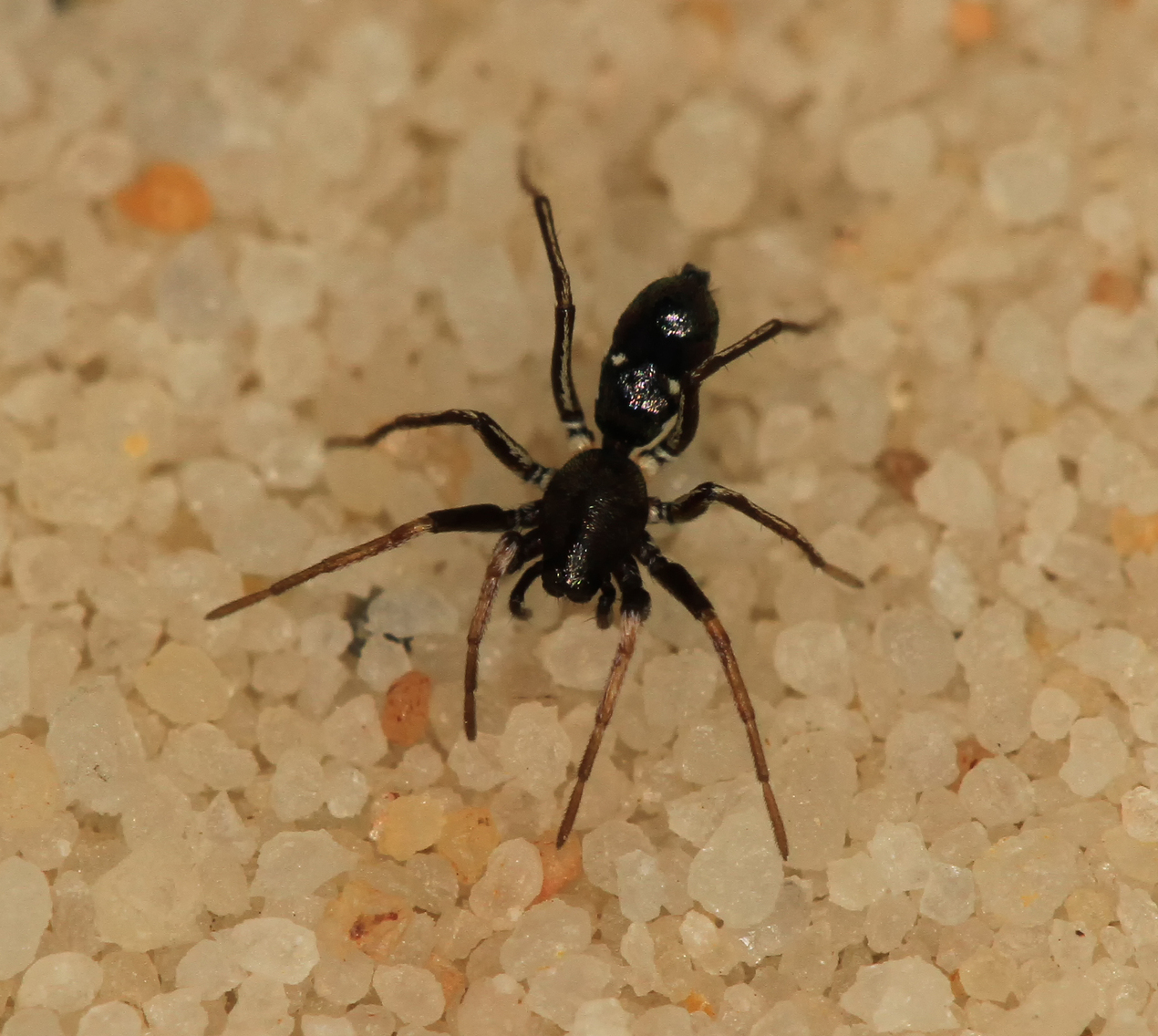
M. tersissima

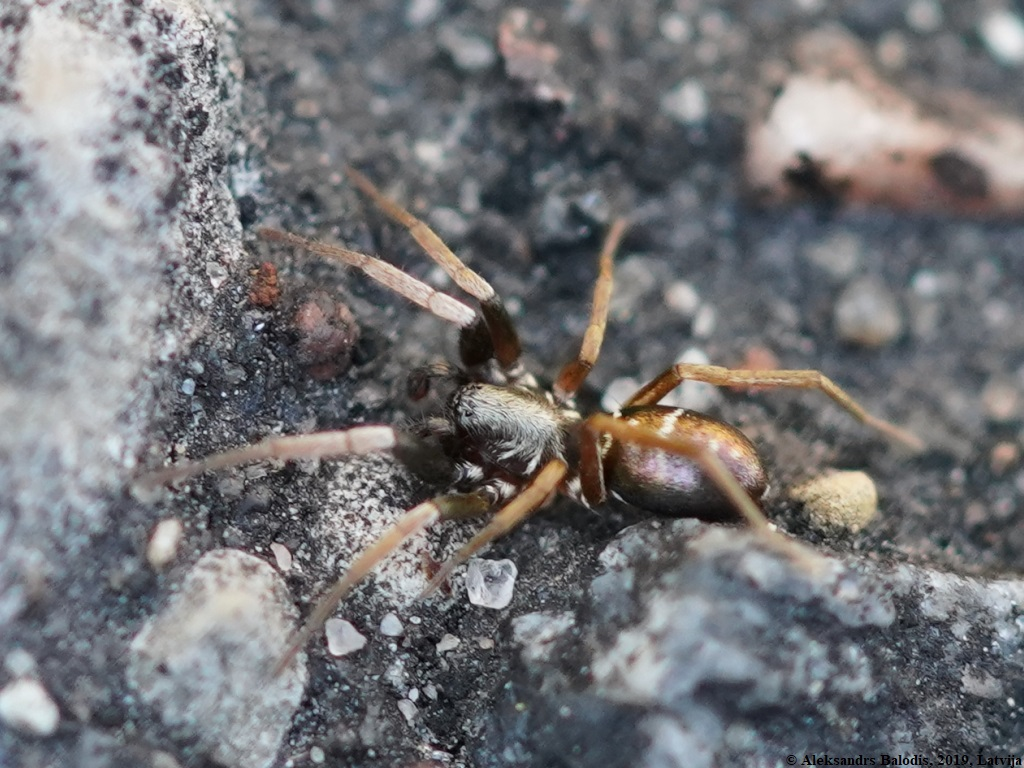
M. pulicaria

Complete species list as of September 2025
- Micaria aborigenica Mikhailov, 1988 – Russia (north-eastern Siberia)
- Micaria aciculata Simon, 1895 – Russia (South Siberia)
- Micaria aenea Thorell, 1871 – Alaska, Canada, United States, Europe, Russia (Europe to Far East), Kazakhstan
- Micaria albofasciata Hu, 2001 – China (Himalaya)
- Micaria albovittata (Lucas, 1846) – Europe, Turkey, Caucasus, Russia (Europe to Central Asia), Iran, Turkmenistan, China?
- Micaria alpina L. Koch, 1872 – Alaska, Canada, Europe, Russia (Europe to Far East), Japan
- Micaria atropatene Zamani & Marusik, 2021 – Azerbaijan, Iran
- Micaria basaliducta Booysen & Haddad, 2021 – South Africa
- Micaria beaufortia (Tucker, 1923) – Ethiopia, Namibia, Botswana, Zimbabwe, Mozambique, South Africa, Lesotho
- Micaria belezma Bosmans, 2000 – Algeria
- Micaria bimaculata Booysen & Haddad, 2021 – Mauritania
- Micaria bispicula Booysen & Haddad, 2021 – Namibia, South Africa
- Micaria bonneti Schenkel, 1963 – Mongolia, China
- Micaria bosmansi Kovblyuk & Nadolny, 2008 – Turkey, Ukraine, Russia (Europe, Caucasus)
- Micaria braendegaardi Denis, 1958 – Afghanistan
- Micaria brignolii (Bosmans & Blick, 2000) – Portugal, Spain, France
- Micaria browni Barnes, 1953 – United States
- Micaria camargo Platnick & Shadab, 1988 – Mexico
- Micaria capistrano Platnick & Shadab, 1988 – United States, Mexico
- Micaria charitonovi Mikhailov & Ponomarev, 2008 – Kazakhstan
- Micaria chrysis (Simon, 1910) – Ivory Coast, Ethiopia, Tanzania, Namibia, Mozambique, South Africa, Lesotho
- Micaria cimarron Platnick & Shadab, 1988 – United States
- Micaria ciri Liu & Zhang, 2025 – China (Himalaya)
- Micaria coarctata (Lucas, 1846) – Mediterranean, Eastern Europe, Caucasus, Russia (Europe to Far East), Iran, Kazakhstan, Central Asia
- Micaria coloradensis Banks, 1896 – Alaska, Canada, United States
- Micaria constricta Emerton, 1894 – Canada, United States, Svalbard, Russia (Northern Europe to Middle Siberia)
- Micaria corvina Simon, 1878 – Morocco, Algeria, Tunisia, Israel
- Micaria croesia L. Koch, 1873 – Australia (New South Wales)
- Micaria cyrnea Brignoli, 1983 – France (Corsica), Italy, Greece
- Micaria delicatula Bryant, 1941 – United States
- Micaria deserticola Gertsch, 1933 – United States, Mexico
- Micaria dives (Lucas, 1846) – Europe, North Africa, Turkey, Israel, Caucasus, Russia (Europe to Far East), Iran, Kazakhstan, Central Asia, Pakistan, India, China, Korea, Japan
  - Micaria dives concolor (Caporiacco, 1935) – Pakistan (Karakorum)
- Micaria donensis Ponomarev & Tsvetkov, 2006 – Ukraine, Russia (Europe)
- Micaria durbana Booysen & Haddad, 2021 – Zambia, South Africa
- Micaria elizabethae Gertsch, 1942 – Canada, United States
- Micaria emertoni Gertsch, 1935 – Canada, United States, Mexico
- Micaria everest Liu & Zhang, 2025 – China (Himalaya)
- Micaria faltana Bhattacharya, 1935 – India
- Micaria felix Booysen & Haddad, 2021 – Cameroon, Ethiopia, Malawi, Zambia, Namibia, Zimbabwe, Mozambique, South Africa
- Micaria formicaria (Sundevall, 1831) – Europe, Turkey, Caucasus, Russia (Europe to Far East), Iran, Kazakhstan, China
- Micaria foxi Gertsch, 1933 – Canada, United States
- Micaria fulgens (Walckenaer, 1802) – Europe, Turkey, Caucasus, Russia (Europe to South Siberia), Iran, Kazakhstan, Central Asia, China (type species)
- Micaria funerea Simon, 1878 – Spain, France (Corsica), Bulgaria, Russia (Caucasus)
- Micaria gagnoa Booysen & Haddad, 2021 – Ivory Coast, Tanzania, Mozambique
- Micaria galilaea Levy, 2009 – Israel
- Micaria ganzi Liu & Zhang, 2025 – China
- Micaria geralt Liu & Zhang, 2025 – China (Himalaya)
- Micaria gertschi Barrows & Ivie, 1942 – Canada, United States
- Micaria gomerae Strand, 1911 – Canary Islands
- Micaria gosiuta Gertsch, 1942 – United States, Mexico
- Micaria gulliae Tuneva & Esyunin, 2003 – Russia (Europe), Kazakhstan
- Micaria guttigera Simon, 1878 – Portugal, Spain, France
- Micaria guttulata (C. L. Koch, 1839) – Europe, Russia (Europe to Far East), Kazakhstan, Kyrgyzstan
- Micaria icenoglei Platnick & Shadab, 1988 – United States
- Micaria idana Platnick & Shadab, 1988 – Canada, United States
- Micaria ignea O. Pickard-Cambridge, 1872 – Cape Verde, Canary Islands, Algeria, Tunisia, Spain, Greece, Cyprus, Egypt, Yemen, Israel, Syria, Azerbaijan, Iran, Central Asia
- Micaria imperiosa Gertsch, 1935 – United States, Mexico
- Micaria inornata L. Koch, 1873 – Australia
- Micaria japonica Hayashi, 1985 – Russia (Far East), Korea, Japan
- Micaria jeanae Gertsch, 1942 – United States, Mexico
- Micaria jinlin Song, Zhu & Zhang, 2004 – China
- Micaria koingnaas Booysen & Haddad, 2021 – South Africa
- Micaria kopetdaghensis Mikhailov, 1986 – Caucasus, Kazakhstan, Iran, Turkmenistan
- Micaria langtry Platnick & Shadab, 1988 – United States
- Micaria lassena Platnick & Shadab, 1988 – United States
- Micaria lata Booysen & Haddad, 2021 – Namibia, South Africa
- Micaria laticeps Emerton, 1909 – Canada, United States
- Micaria laxa Booysen & Haddad, 2021 – South Africa
- Micaria lenzi Bösenberg, 1899 – Europe, Turkey, Caucasus, Russia (Europe to South and north-eastern Siberia), Iran, Kazakhstan, Central Asia, China
- Micaria lindbergi Roewer, 1962 – Afghanistan
- Micaria longimana Suzuki, 2022 – China, Japan (Ryukyu Is.)
- Micaria longipes Emerton, 1890 – Canada, United States, Mexico
- Micaria longispina Emerton, 1911 – Canada, United States
- Micaria marchesii (Caporiacco, 1936) – Libya
- Micaria marusiki Zhang, Song & Zhu, 2001 – China
- Micaria medica Platnick & Shadab, 1988 – Canada, United States
- Micaria mediospina Booysen & Haddad, 2021 – South Africa
- Micaria mexicana Platnick & Shadab, 1988 – Mexico
- Micaria micans (Blackwall, 1858) – Europe, Caucasus, Russia (Europe to South Siberia), Kazakhstan, Central Asia, China
- Micaria mongunica Danilov, 1997 – Russia (South Siberia)
- Micaria mormon Gertsch, 1935 – Canada, United States, Mexico
- Micaria nanella Gertsch, 1935 – United States, Mexico
- Micaria nivosa L. Koch, 1866 – Europe, Russia (Europe to South Siberia), Kazakhstan, China
- Micaria nye Platnick & Shadab, 1988 – United States, Mexico
- Micaria otero Platnick & Shadab, 1988 – United States, Mexico
- Micaria pallens Denis, 1958 – Afghanistan
- Micaria palliditarsus Banks, 1896 – United States, Mexico
- Micaria pallipes (Lucas, 1846) – Azores, Madeira, Mediterranean, Russia (Europe), Caucasus, Kazakhstan, Iran, Central Asia, China
- Micaria palma Platnick & Shadab, 1988 – United States
- Micaria palmgreni Wunderlich, 1980 – Finland
- Micaria paralbofasciata Song, Zhu & Zhang, 2004 – China (Himalaya)
- Micaria parvotibialis Booysen & Haddad, 2021 – Senegal
- Micaria pasadena Platnick & Shadab, 1988 – United States, Mexico
- Micaria plana Booysen & Haddad, 2021 – Ethiopia
- Micaria porta Platnick & Shadab, 1988 – Canada, United States
- Micaria pulcherrima Caporiacco, 1935 – Pakistan, India, Russia (South Siberia), China, Korea
  - Micaria pulcherrima flava Caporiacco, 1935 – Pakistan (Karakorum)
- Micaria pulicaria (Sundevall, 1831) – Europe, Georgia, Russia (Europe to Far East), Kazakhstan, China, Japan, Alaska, Canada, United States
- Micaria punctata Banks, 1896 – United States
- Micaria quadrata Booysen & Haddad, 2021 – Ethiopia
- Micaria quinquemaculosa Booysen & Haddad, 2021 – Namibia, South Africa
- Micaria riggsi Gertsch, 1942 – Canada, United States
- Micaria rivonosy Booysen & Haddad, 2021 – Madagascar
- Micaria rossica Thorell, 1875 – Alaska, Canada, United States, Europe, Turkey, Caucasus, Russia (Europe to Far East), Kazakhstan, Iran, Central Asia, Mongolia, China
- Micaria sanipass Booysen & Haddad, 2021 – South Africa
- Micaria scutellata Booysen & Haddad, 2021 – South Africa
- Micaria seminola Gertsch, 1942 – United States
- Micaria seymuria Tuneva, 2004 – Kazakhstan
- Micaria silesiaca L. Koch, 1875 – Europe, Turkey, Caucasus, Russia (Europe to South Siberia)
- Micaria siniloana Barrion & Litsinger, 1995 – Philippines
- Micaria sociabilis Kulczyński, 1897 – Europe, Turkey, Caucasus (Russia, Azerbaijan)
- Micaria subopaca Westring, 1861 – Europe, Russia (Europe to South Siberia, Kamchatka), Georgia, Iran
- Micaria tarabaevi Mikhailov, 1988 – Kazakhstan
- Micaria tersissima Simon, 1910 – South Africa
- Micaria triangulosa Gertsch, 1935 – United States
- Micaria triguttata Simon, 1884 – Portugal, Spain, France, Algeria
- Micaria tripunctata Holm, 1978 – Northern Europe, Italy (Alps), Russia (Europe to Far East), China, Alaska, Canada
- Micaria tuvensis Danilov, 1993 – Russia (Central Asia, South Siberia), Kazakhstan, China
- Micaria utahna Gertsch, 1933 – Canada, United States
- Micaria vinnula Gertsch & Davis, 1936 – United States
- Micaria violens Oliger, 1983 – Russia (Far East)
- Micaria xinglongi Liu & Zhang, 2025 – China (Himalaya)
- Micaria xizang Liu & Zhang, 2025 – China (Himalaya)
- Micaria ya Liu & Zhang, 2025 – China
- Micaria yeniseica Marusik & Koponen, 2002 – Russia (Middle Siberia, Kamchatka)
- Micaria yeti Liu & Zhang, 2025 – China (Himalaya)
- Micaria yunshani Liu & Zhang, 2025 – China (Himalaya)
- Micaria zonsteini (Mikhailov, 2016) – Azerbaijan, Kyrgyzstan
