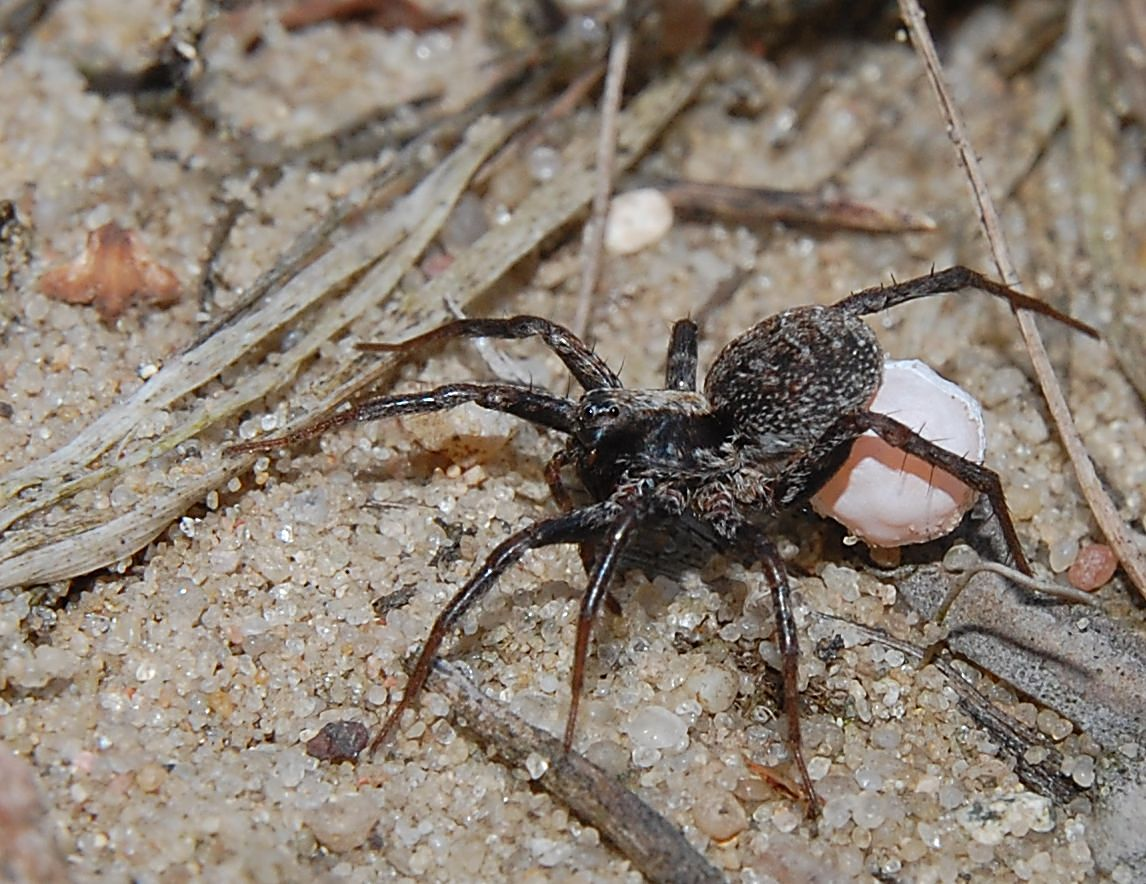
- Xerolycosa miniata female with egg sac

Scientific classification
- Kingdom: Animalia
- Phylum: Arthropoda
- Subphylum: Chelicerata
- Class: Arachnida
- Order: Araneae
- Infraorder: Araneomorphae
- Family: Lycosidae
- Genus: Xerolycosa; Dahl, 1908

Type species
- Lycosa nemoralis (Westring, 1861)

= Xerolycosa =

Genus of spiders

Xerolycosa is a small genus of wolf spiders in the family Lycosidae, subfamily Evippinae, consisting of three species which have a Palearctic distribution and one with an Afro-tropical distribution.

== Species ==
As of August 2016, the World Spider Catalog accepted the following species:

- Xerolycosa miniata (C.L. Koch, 1834) – Palearctic
- Xerolycosa mongolica (Schenkel, 1963) – Russia, China
- Xerolycosa nemoralis (Westring, 1861) – Palearctic
- Xerolycosa sansibarina Roewer, 1960 – Zanzibar
