= Styloctetor =

Scientific classification
- Kingdom: Animalia
- Phylum: Arthropoda
- Subphylum: Chelicerata
- Class: Arachnida
- Order: Araneae
- Infraorder: Araneomorphae
- Family: Linyphiidae
- Genus: Styloctetor; Simon, 1884

Type species
- S. romanus (O. Pickard-Cambridge, 1873)

Species
- 8, see text

Synonyms
- Anacotyle Simon, 1926

Genus of spiders

Styloctetor is a genus of sheet weavers that was first described by Eugène Louis Simon in 1884.

== Species ==
As of May 2019 it contains eight species, found in Asia and North Africa:

- Styloctetor austerus (L. Koch, 1884) – Switzerland, Austria
- Styloctetor compar (Westring, 1861) – USA (Alaska), Canada, Europe, Russia (European to Far East)
- Styloctetor lehtineni Marusik & Tanasevitch, 1998 – Russia
- Styloctetor logunovi (Eskov & Marusik, 1994) – Russia, Kazakhstan, Mongolia
- Styloctetor okhotensis (Eskov, 1993) – Russia
- Styloctetor purpurescens (Keyserling, 1886) – USA, Canada
- Styloctetor romanus (O. Pickard-Cambridge, 1873) (type) – Europe, North Africa, Turkey, Caucasus, Russia (Europe to Far East), Central Asia, China
- Styloctetor tuvinensis Marusik & Tanasevitch, 1998 – Russia
