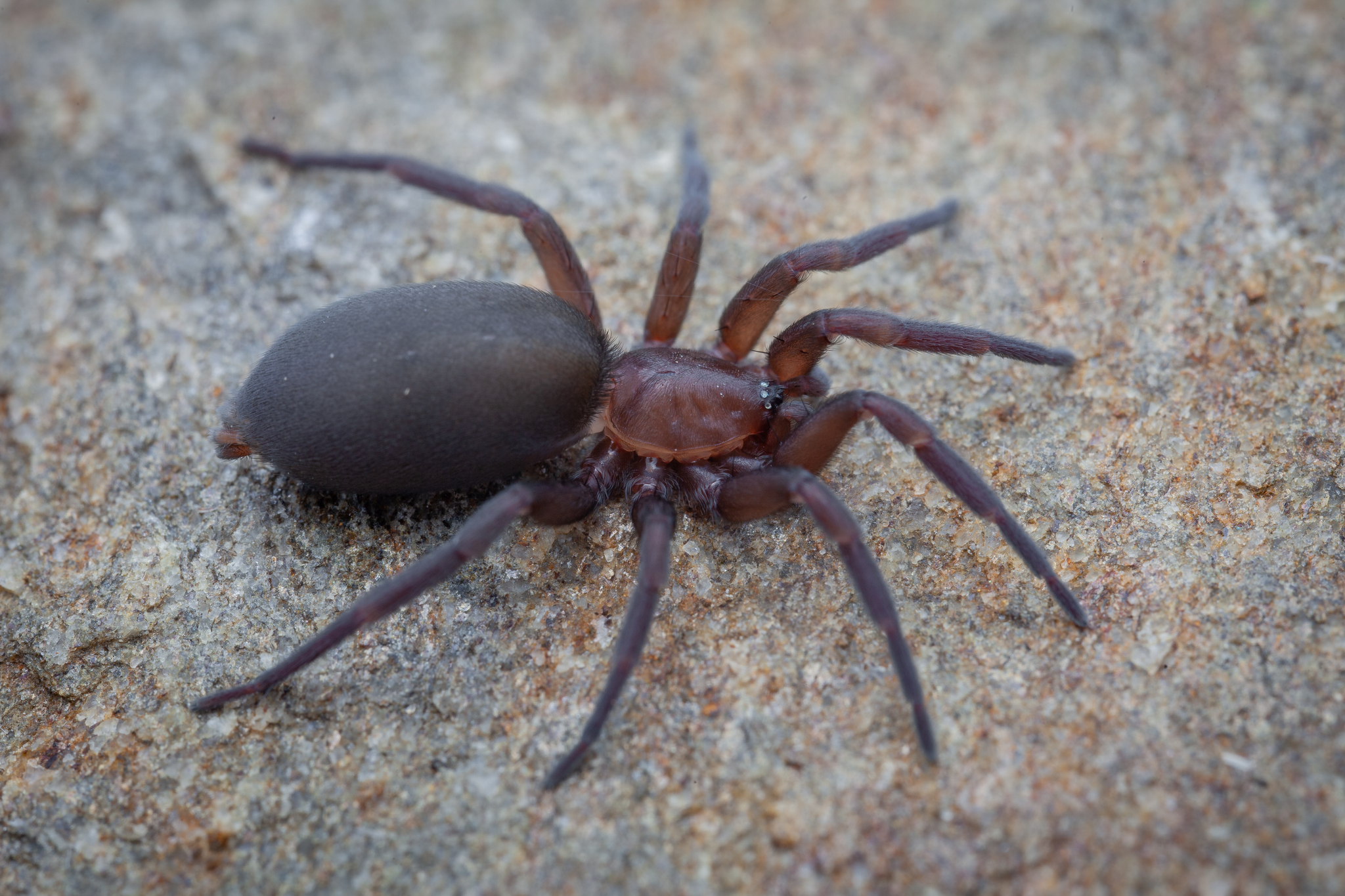
- E. angustifrons from Austria

Scientific classification
- Kingdom: Animalia
- Phylum: Arthropoda
- Subphylum: Chelicerata
- Class: Arachnida
- Order: Araneae
- Infraorder: Araneomorphae
- Family: Gnaphosidae
- Genus: Echemus; Simon, 1878

Type species
- E. angustifrons (Westring, 1861)

Species
- 22, see text

Synonyms
- Boreoechemus Lohmander, 1942

= Echemus (spider) =

Genus of spiders

Echemus is a genus of ground spiders that was first described by Eugène Simon in 1878.

== Description ==
Spiders of the genus Echemus have a total length of 5.7 mm. The carapace is longer than wide and yellowish brown, with slightly darker chelicerae. The anterior row of eyes is strongly procurved, with medians light in colour, round, and less than a diameter apart. The laterals are light in colour, oval, slightly smaller than the medians, and very close to them.

The posterior row is very strongly procurved, with medians subangular and close together, distant their long diameter from the anterior medians. The posterior medians are larger than the posterior laterals, which are subequal to the anterior laterals, and about their own diameter from the posterior medians.

The abdomen is testaceous and slightly infuscated dorsally. The inferior spinnerets are short, cylindrical, and nearly their own length apart. The first pair of legs is considerably darker and redder distally.

== Species ==
As of September 2025, this genus includes 23 species:

- Echemus almeriensis Barrientos, 2024 – Spain
- Echemus angustifrons (Westring, 1861) – Europe, Central Asia (type species)
- Echemus caspicus Zamani, Chatzaki, Esyunin & Marusik, 2021 – Iran
- Echemus chaetognathus (Thorell, 1887) – Myanmar
- Echemus chaperi Simon, 1885 – India
- Echemus chebanus (Thorell, 1897) – Myanmar
- Echemus chialanus Thorell, 1897 – Myanmar
- Echemus dilutus (L. Koch, 1873) – Australia (Queensland)
- Echemus erutus Tucker, 1923 – Namibia, Botswana, South Africa
- Echemus escalerai Simon, 1909 – Morocco
- Echemus ghecuanus (Thorell, 1897) – Myanmar
- Echemus inermis Mello-Leitão, 1939 – Brazil
- Echemus interemptor (O. Pickard-Cambridge, 1885) – India
- Echemus kaltsasi Chatzaki, 2019 – Greece (Symi)
- Echemus lacertosus Simon, 1907 – São Tomé and Príncipe
- Echemus levyi Kovblyuk & Seyyar, 2009 – Greece, Cyprus, Turkey, Georgia
- Echemus modestus Kulczyński, 1899 – Madeira
- Echemus orinus (Thorell, 1897) – Myanmar
- Echemus pictus Kulczyński, 1911 – Indonesia (Java)
- Echemus plapoensis (Thorell, 1897) – Myanmar
- Echemus scutatus (Simon, 1880) – Algeria
- Echemus sibiricus Marusik & Logunov, 1995 – Russia (South Siberia)
- Echemus viveki Gajbe, 1989 – Himalaya (India, China)
