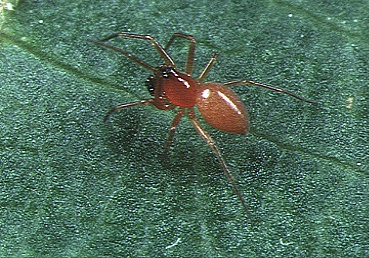
- E. tanikawai, male
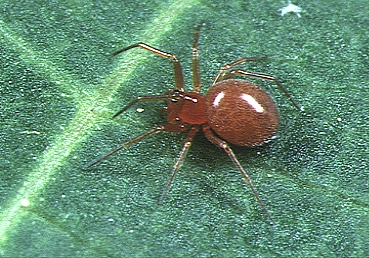
- E. tanikawai, female

Scientific classification
- Kingdom: Animalia
- Phylum: Arthropoda
- Subphylum: Chelicerata
- Class: Arachnida
- Order: Araneae
- Infraorder: Araneomorphae
- Family: Linyphiidae
- Genus: Entelecara; Simon, 1884

Type species
- E. acuminata (Wider, 1834)

Species
- 21, see text

Synonyms
- Stajus Simon, 1884

= Entelecara =

Genus of spiders

Entelecara is a genus of dwarf spiders that was first described by Eugène Louis Simon in 1884.

== Species ==
As of May 2019 it contains twenty-one species:

- Entelecara acuminata (Wider, 1834) (type) – USA, Europe, Russia (Europe to South Siberia), Central Asia
- Entelecara aestiva Simon, 1918 – France, Italy
- Entelecara aurea Gao & Zhu, 1993 – China
- Entelecara cacuminum Denis, 1954 – France
- Entelecara congenera (O. Pickard-Cambridge, 1879) – Europe, Russia (Europe to South Siberia)
- Entelecara dabudongensis Paik, 1983 – Russia (Far East), China, Korea, Japan
- Entelecara errata O. Pickard-Cambridge, 1913 – Europe
- Entelecara erythropus (Westring, 1851) – Europe, Russia (Europe to Far East), Kazakhstan, Japan
- Entelecara flavipes (Blackwall, 1834) – Europe
- Entelecara forsslundi Tullgren, 1955 – Sweden, Estonia, Ukraine, Russia (Europe)
- Entelecara helfridae Tullgren, 1955 – Sweden
- Entelecara italica Thaler, 1984 – Italy
- Entelecara klefbecki Tullgren, 1955 – Sweden
- Entelecara media Kulczyński, 1887 – North America, Europe, Russia (Europe to Far East), Kazakhstan
- Entelecara obscura Miller, 1971 – Czech Rep., Slovakia
- Entelecara omissa O. Pickard-Cambridge, 1903 – Europe
- Entelecara schmitzi Kulczyński, 1905 – Madeira, France
- Entelecara sombra (Chamberlin & Ivie, 1947) – Canada, USA
- Entelecara tanikawai Tazoe, 1993 – Japan
- Entelecara truncatifrons (O. Pickard-Cambridge, 1875) – France, Corsica, Algeria
- Entelecara turbinata Simon, 1918 – France
