= P. leonina =

P. leonina may refer to:

- Pelecopsis leonina, a spider species in the genus Pelecopsis and the family Linyphiidae
- Peripatopsis leonina, the Lion's Hill velvet worm, a species in the Phylum Onychophora

== See also ==
- Leonina (disambiguation)
