= Micaria chrysis =

Scientific classification
- Kingdom: Animalia
- Phylum: Arthropoda
- Subphylum: Chelicerata
- Class: Arachnida
- Order: Araneae
- Infraorder: Araneomorphae
- Family: Gnaphosidae
- Genus: Micaria
- Species: M. chrysis

Binomial name
- Micaria chrysis (Simon, 1910)

Synonyms
- Micariolepis chrysis Simon, 1910

Species of spider

Micaria chrysis is a species of spider in the family Gnaphosidae. It occurs in Africa and is commonly known as the Port Nolloth Micaria ground spider.

== Distribution ==
Micaria chrysis has a wide distribution across Africa, occurring in Ivory Coast, Ethiopia, Tanzania, Namibia, Mozambique, South Africa, and Lesotho. In South Africa, it is known only from Port Nolloth in the Northern Cape at an altitude of 14 m above sea level.

== Habitat and ecology ==
The species is a free-living ground dweller found in the Succulent Karoo biome.

== Conservation ==
Micaria chrysis is listed as Data Deficient for taxonomic reasons. In South Africa, the species has a very small range, being known only from the type locality. More sampling is needed to collect additional specimens and determine the species' actual range.

== Taxonomy ==
The species was originally described by Simon in 1910 as Micariolepis chrysis from Port Nolloth. It was later transferred to the genus Micaria and redescribed by Booysen and Haddad in 2021, who noted that the original description was based on subadult specimens.
