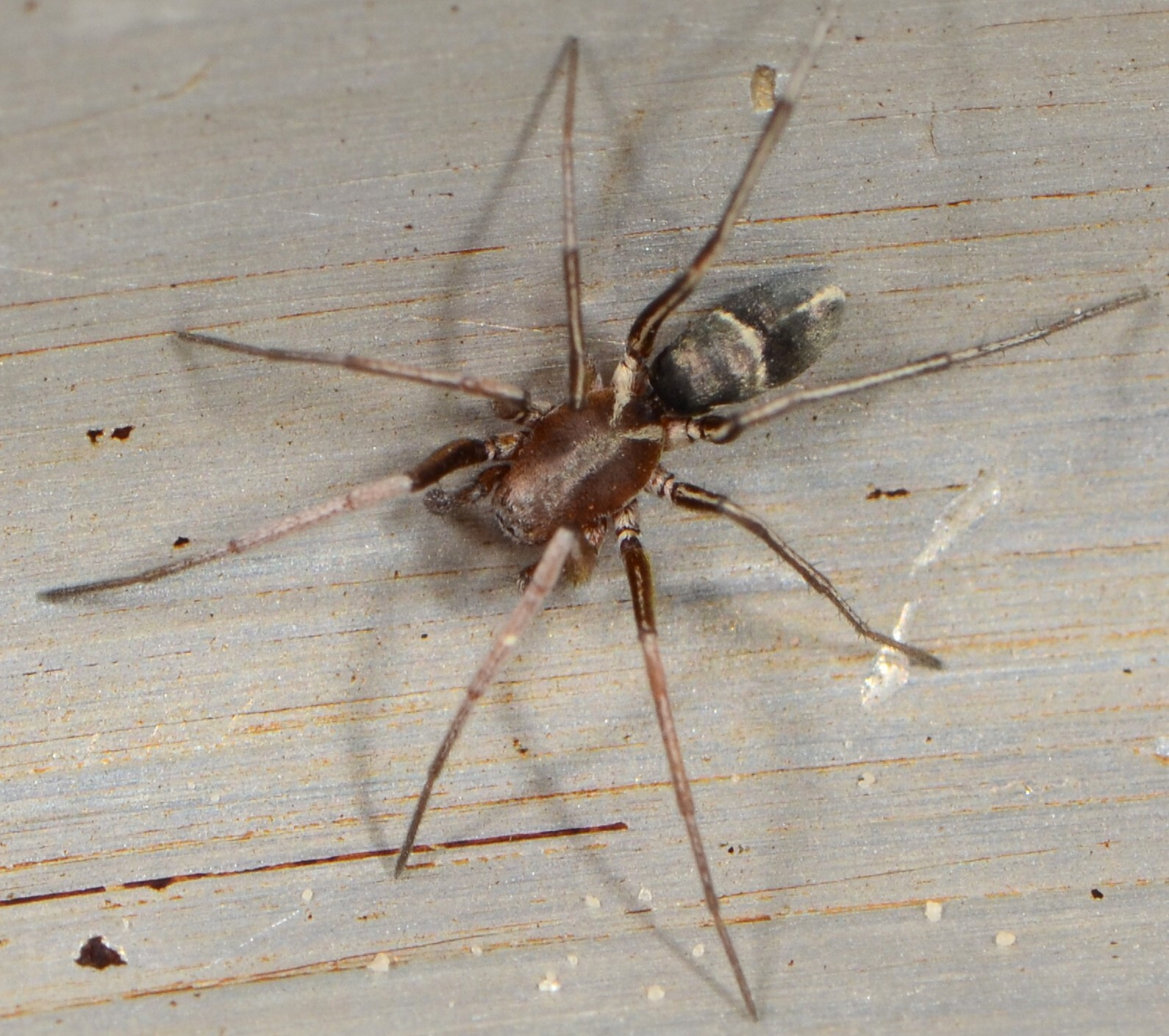
- male
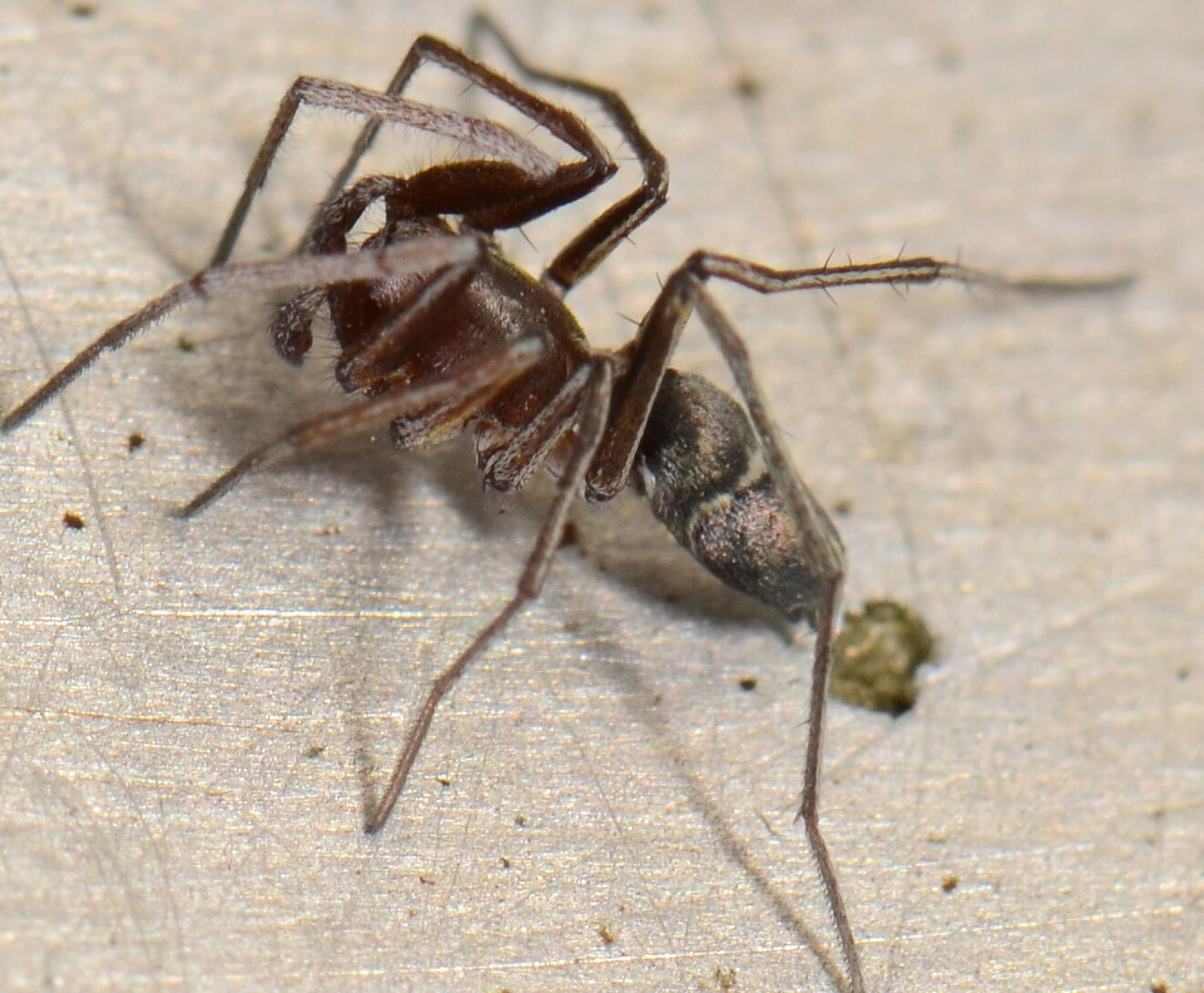
- male

Scientific classification
- Kingdom: Animalia
- Phylum: Arthropoda
- Subphylum: Chelicerata
- Class: Arachnida
- Order: Araneae
- Infraorder: Araneomorphae
- Family: Gnaphosidae
- Genus: Micaria
- Species: M. beaufortia

Binomial name
- Micaria beaufortia Tucker, 1923

Synonyms
- Epikurtomma beaufortia Tucker, 1923

= Micaria beaufortia =

Species of spider

Micaria beaufortia is a species of spider in the family Gnaphosidae. It occurs in southern Africa.

== Distribution ==
Micaria beaufortia has a wide distribution in southern Africa, occurring in Ethiopia, Namibia, Botswana, Zimbabwe, Mozambique, South Africa, and Lesotho. In South Africa, it is found in several provinces including Free State, KwaZulu-Natal, Northern Cape, and Western Cape.

== Habitat and ecology ==
The species is a free-living ground dweller found in Grassland and Savanna biomes at altitudes ranging from 322 to 1,552 m above sea level.

== Conservation ==
Micaria beaufortia is listed as Least Concern due to its wide geographic range across southern Africa. Recent surveys have shown that the species is abundant around Beaufort West and is found in the Karoo National Park and Karoo Desert National Botanical Garden. The species is protected in nine protected areas.

== Taxonomy ==
The species was originally described by Tucker in 1923 as Epikurtomma beaufortia from Beaufort West. It was later transferred to the genus Micaria and redescribed by Marusik and Omelko in 2017.
