= Poecilochroa involuta =

Poecilochroa Ground Spider

Conservation status
- Least Concern (SANBI Red List)

Scientific classification
- Kingdom: Animalia
- Phylum: Arthropoda
- Subphylum: Chelicerata
- Class: Arachnida
- Order: Araneae
- Infraorder: Araneomorphae
- Family: Gnaphosidae
- Genus: Poecilochroa
- Species: P. involuta

Binomial name
- Poecilochroa involuta Tucker, 1923

Species of spider

Poecilochroa involuta is a species of spider in the family Gnaphosidae. It is endemic to South Africa and is commonly known as Poecilochroa ground spider.

== Distribution ==
Poecilochroa involuta is found in three South African provinces: Free State, KwaZulu-Natal, and Western Cape. Notable locations include Clocolan, iSimangaliso Wetland Park, Ithala Nature Reserve, Ndumo Game Reserve, Fernkloof Nature Reserve, Swartberg Nature Reserve, and Bontebok National Park.

== Habitat and ecology ==
The species is a free-living ground dweller found at altitudes ranging from 5 to 1,593 m above sea level. It has been sampled from Fynbos, Grassland, Indian Ocean Coastal Belt, Nama Karoo, Savanna, and Thicket biomes.

== Description ==
Females have a carapace that is very dark and infuscated marginally, with an infuscated network from the median ocular area to the stria. The abdomen is dull grey brown and slightly lighter on the ventral surface.

The sternum, coxae, and femora are dark, while the legs are lighter from the patella onwards. Femur I bears a light patch on the external surface. The integument is clothed with light brown sparse pubescence. Total length is 6.4 mm.

== Conservation ==
Poecilochroa involuta is listed as Least Concern by the South African National Biodiversity Institute due to its wide geographic range. The species faces no significant threats.

== Taxonomy ==
The species was originally described by Tucker in 1923 from Avontuur in the Western Cape. It is currently known only from female specimens.
