= Micaria longispina =

Scientific classification
- Domain: Eukaryota
- Kingdom: Animalia
- Phylum: Arthropoda
- Subphylum: Chelicerata
- Class: Arachnida
- Order: Araneae
- Infraorder: Araneomorphae
- Family: Gnaphosidae
- Genus: Micaria
- Species: M. longispina

Binomial name
- Micaria longispina Emerton, 1911

Species of spider

Micaria longispina is a species of ground spider in the family Gnaphosidae. It is found in the United States and Canada.
