= Echemus lacertosus =

Scientific classification
- Domain: Eukaryota
- Kingdom: Animalia
- Phylum: Arthropoda
- Subphylum: Chelicerata
- Class: Arachnida
- Order: Araneae
- Infraorder: Araneomorphae
- Family: Gnaphosidae
- Genus: Echemus
- Species: E. lacertosus

Binomial name
- Echemus lacertosus Simon, 1907

Species of spider

Echemus lacertosus is an endemic spider species of the family Gnaphosidae that lives on Príncipe in São Tomé and Príncipe. It was first described in 1907 by Eugène Simon.

Its female holotype measures 8 mm.
