= Micaria pasadena =

Scientific classification
- Kingdom: Animalia
- Phylum: Arthropoda
- Subphylum: Chelicerata
- Class: Arachnida
- Order: Araneae
- Infraorder: Araneomorphae
- Family: Gnaphosidae
- Genus: Micaria
- Species: M. pasadena

Binomial name
- Micaria pasadena Platnick & Shadab, 1988

Species of spider

Micaria pasadena is a species of ground spider in the family Gnaphosidae. It is found in the United States and Mexico.
