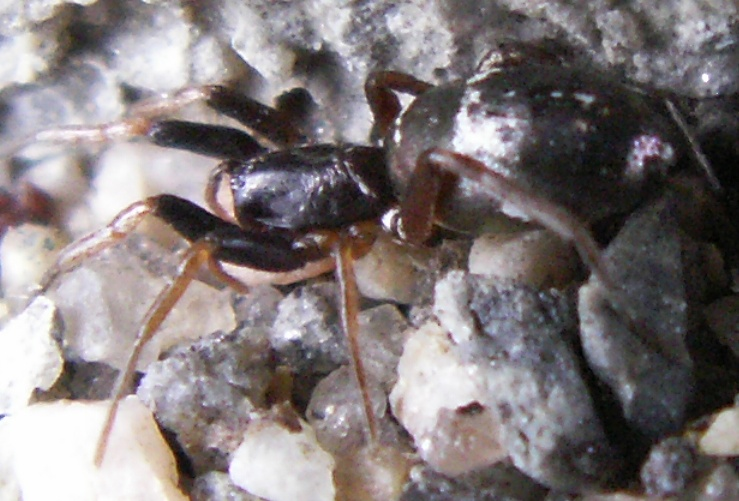

Scientific classification
- Domain: Eukaryota
- Kingdom: Animalia
- Phylum: Arthropoda
- Subphylum: Chelicerata
- Class: Arachnida
- Order: Araneae
- Infraorder: Araneomorphae
- Family: Gnaphosidae
- Genus: Micaria
- Species: M. pulicaria

Binomial name
- Micaria pulicaria (Sundevall, 1831)

Synonyms
- Clubiona pulicaria Sundevall, 1831; Drassus nitens Blackwall, 1833; Drassus lugubris Walckenaer, 1837; Macaria corusca C. L. Koch, 1837; Macaria nitens (Blackwall, 1833); Macaria Formosa C. L. Koch, 1839; Drassus formosus (C. L. Koch, 1839); Drassus micans Blackwall, 1858; Micaria nitens (Blackwall, 1858); Macaria lugubris (Walckenaer, 1837); Micaria montana Emerton, 1890; Micaria gentilis Banks, 1896; Micaria perfecta Banks, 1896; Micaria similis Bösenberg, 1902

= Micaria pulicaria =

Species of spider

Micaria pulicaria, the glossy ant spider, is a species of ground spider from the family Gnaphosidae with a Holarctic distribution.

== Description ==
The cephalothorax is glossy black, although less iridescent than the opisthosoma, and marked with radiating white lines. The abdomen is very iridescent and shows two parallel, white lines across the prosoma, with three dots in a line along the posterior portion of the prosoma. The femora on legs I and II are black, while those on legs III and IV are dark brown. The body length of the females is 2.7–4.5 mm while for males it is 3–3.5 mm.

== Biology ==
Micaria pulicaria is not ant hunting, although it associates with ants, and it quivers its front legs to mimic ant antennae which may help prevent it falling prey to those larger spiders which generally avoid contact with ants. The females enclose the eggs within a stiff sac resembling a rimmed pot and although she does not guard them, she does return frequently to check it. The adults have been recorded from early February to late November, although they may occur throughout the year. The main season is from late spring until mid-summer.

== Habitat ==
Micaria pulicaria is found at ground level in a wide variety of habitats, although showing a marked preference for sandy sites. The preferred habitat has scattered stones or small beds of stones. In Great Britain it has been recorded from the warm, sunny parts of sandy heaths, chalk downlands, dunes and derelict land, but it has also been found in saltmarsh, sphagnum filled dune slacks, mossy areas in broad-leaved woodland as well as the expected stony, bare, dry habitats.

== Distribution ==
Micaria pulicaria has a Holarctic distribution. In Europe it is found throughout, including Ireland and Iceland. In countries with good recording schemes, such as Great Britain, Denmark and the Czech Republic, the species is recorded as frequent and widespread.
