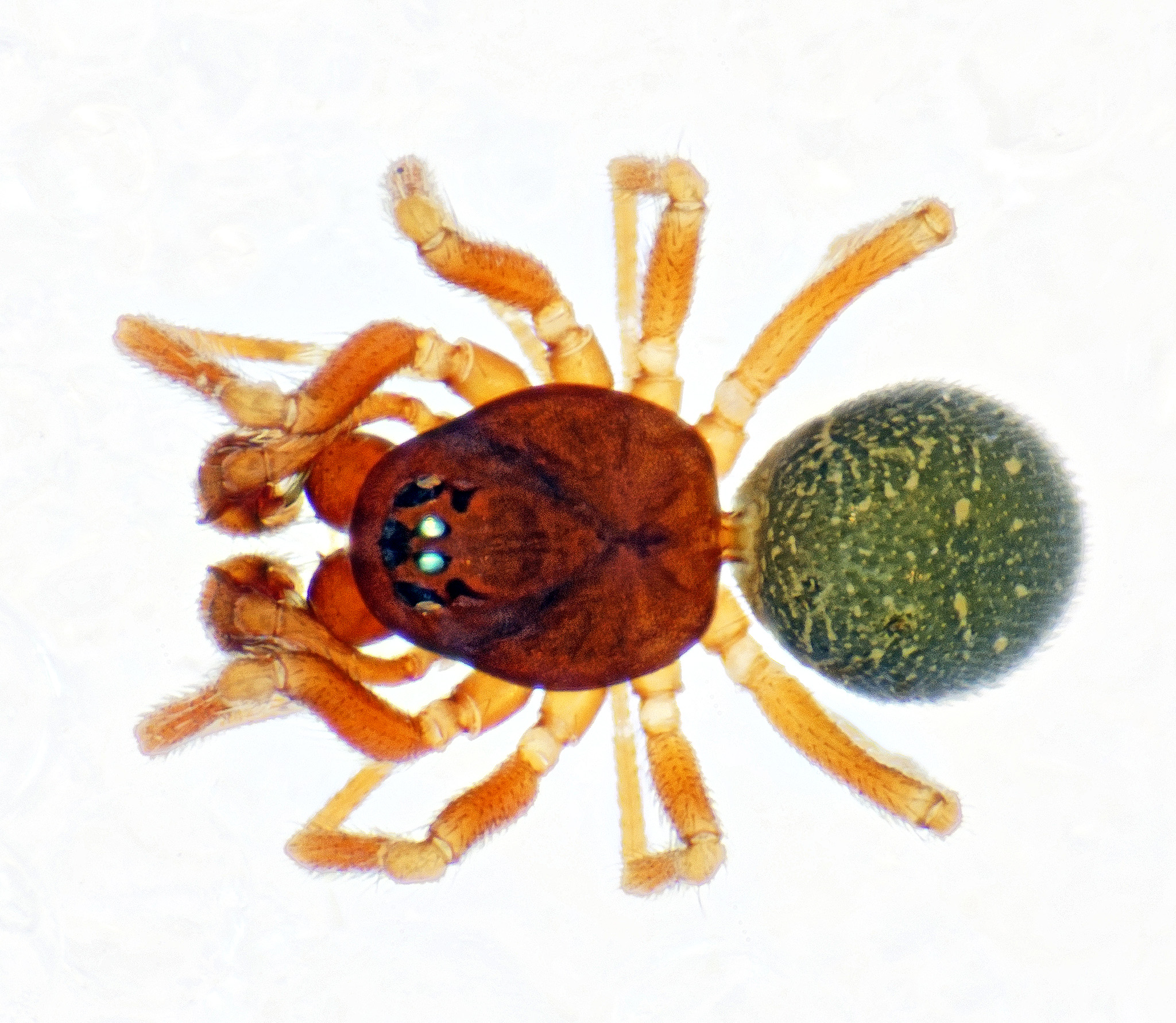
- Micrargus herbigradus

Scientific classification
- Kingdom: Animalia
- Phylum: Arthropoda
- Subphylum: Chelicerata
- Class: Arachnida
- Order: Araneae
- Infraorder: Araneomorphae
- Family: Linyphiidae
- Genus: Micrargus; Dahl, 1886

Type species
- M. herbigradus (Blackwall, 1854)

Species
- 17, see text

Synonyms
- Blaniargus Simon, 1913; Nothocyba Simon, 1926; Plexisma Hull, 1920

= Micrargus =

Genus of spiders

Micrargus is a genus of dwarf spiders that was first described by Friedrich Dahl in 1886.

== Species ==
As of May 2019 it contains seventeen species:

- Micrargus aleuticus Holm, 1960 – USA (Alaska)
- Micrargus alpinus Relys & Weiss, 1997 – Germany, Switzerland, Austria
- Micrargus apertus (O. Pickard-Cambridge, 1871) – Europe, Japan
- Micrargus cavernicola Wunderlich, 1995 – Japan
- Micrargus cupidon (Simon, 1913) – France
- Micrargus dilutus (Denis, 1948) – France
- Micrargus dissimilis Denis, 1950 – France
- Micrargus fuscipalpis (Denis, 1962) – Uganda
- Micrargus georgescuae Millidge, 1976 – Europe
- Micrargus herbigradus (Blackwall, 1854) (type) – Europe, North Africa, Turkey, Caucasus, Russia to Kazakhstan, China, Japan
- Micrargus hokkaidoensis Wunderlich, 1995 – Japan
- Micrargus laudatus (O. Pickard-Cambridge, 1881) – Europe
- Micrargus longitarsus (Emerton, 1882) – USA, Canada
- Micrargus nibeoventris (Komatsu, 1942) – Japan
- Micrargus parvus Wunderlich, 2011 – Canary Is.
- Micrargus pervicax (Denis, 1947) – France, possibly Austria
- Micrargus subaequalis (Westring, 1851) – Europe, Turkey, Caucasus, Russia to Kazakhstan, China
