= Micaria gertschi =

Scientific classification
- Kingdom: Animalia
- Phylum: Arthropoda
- Subphylum: Chelicerata
- Class: Arachnida
- Order: Araneae
- Infraorder: Araneomorphae
- Family: Gnaphosidae
- Genus: Micaria
- Species: M. gertschi

Binomial name
- Micaria gertschi Barrows & Ivie, 1942

Species of spider

Micaria gertschi is a species of ground spider in the family Gnaphosidae. It is found in the United States and Canada.
