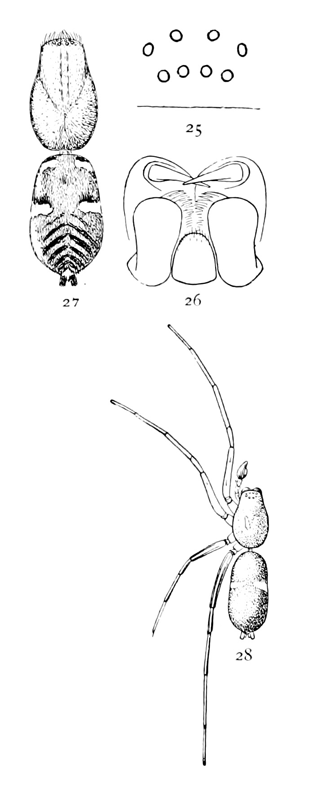

Scientific classification
- Domain: Eukaryota
- Kingdom: Animalia
- Phylum: Arthropoda
- Subphylum: Chelicerata
- Class: Arachnida
- Order: Araneae
- Infraorder: Araneomorphae
- Family: Gnaphosidae
- Genus: Micaria
- Species: M. longipes

Binomial name
- Micaria longipes Emerton, 1890

Synonyms
- Micaria alberta Gertsch, 1942

= Micaria longipes =

Species of spider

Micaria longipes is a species of ground spider in the family Gnaphosidae. It is found in North America.
