= Echemus erutus =

Pale Echemus Ground Spider

Conservation status
- Least Concern (SANBI Red List)

Scientific classification
- Kingdom: Animalia
- Phylum: Arthropoda
- Subphylum: Chelicerata
- Class: Arachnida
- Order: Araneae
- Infraorder: Araneomorphae
- Family: Gnaphosidae
- Genus: Echemus
- Species: E. erutus

Binomial name
- Echemus erutus Tucker, 1923

Species of spider

Echemus erutus is a species of spider in the family Gnaphosidae. It is a southern African endemic species commonly known as the pale Echemus ground spider.

== Distribution ==
Echemus erutus is distributed across Botswana, Namibia, and South Africa. In South Africa, it is recorded from four provinces: KwaZulu-Natal, Limpopo, Northern Cape, and Western Cape.

== Habitat and ecology ==
The species is a free-living ground dweller, sampled from the Savanna, Indian Ocean Coastal Belt, and Nama Karoo biomes at altitudes ranging from 29 to 1,523 m above sea level. It has also been sampled from macadamia orchards.

== Description ==
Echemus erutus is known only from the female. The carapace is yellowish brown with slightly darker chelicerae. The first pair of legs is considerably darker and redder distally, while the posterior legs are similar in colour to the carapace. The abdomen is testaceous and slightly infuscated dorsally. Total length is 5.7 mm.

== Conservation ==
Echemus erutus is listed as Least Concern by the South African National Biodiversity Institute. The species has a wide geographical range and is protected in more than 10 protected areas.

== Taxonomy ==
The species was originally described by Tucker in 1923 from Botswana.
