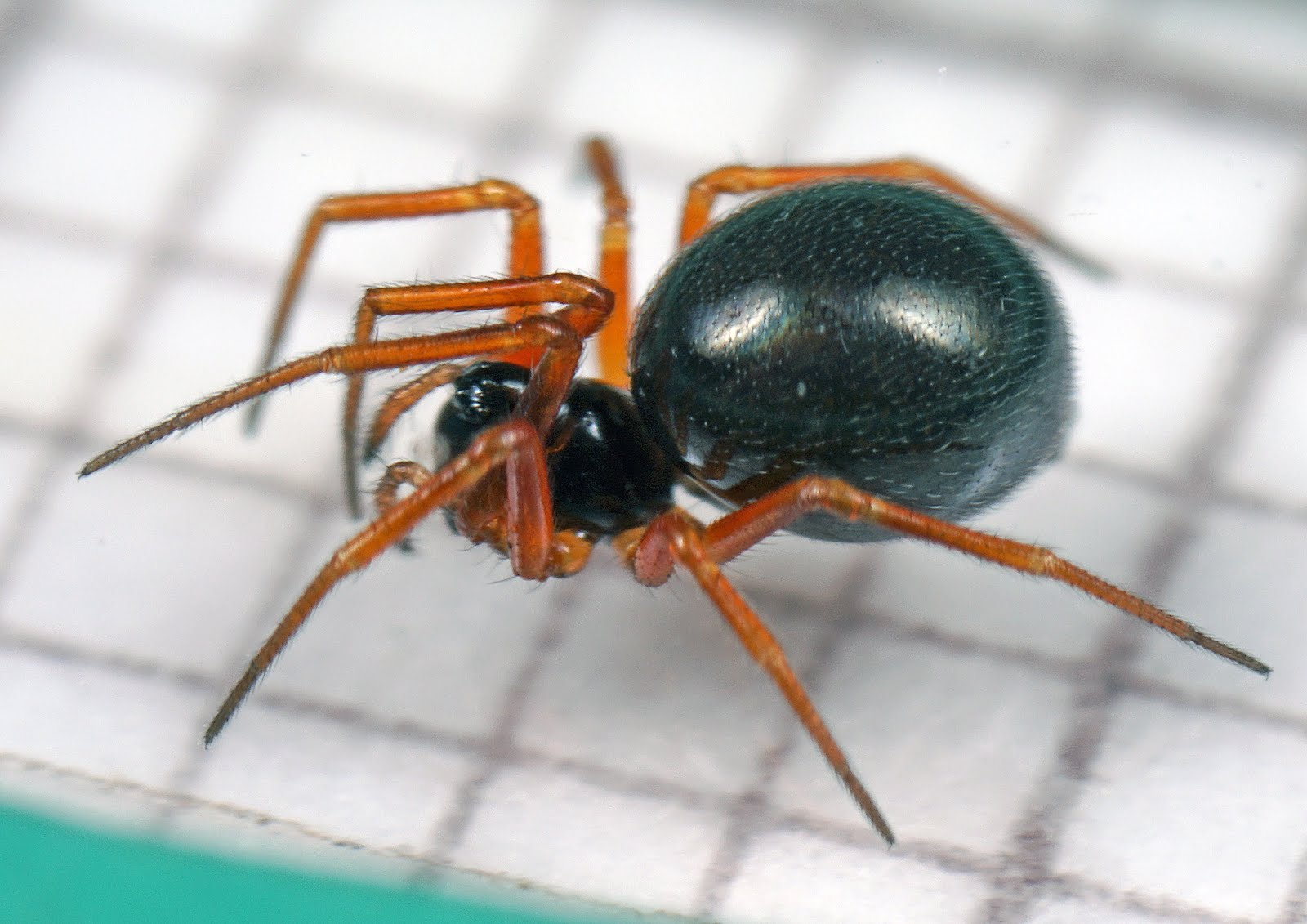

Scientific classification
- Domain: Eukaryota
- Kingdom: Animalia
- Phylum: Arthropoda
- Subphylum: Chelicerata
- Class: Arachnida
- Order: Araneae
- Infraorder: Araneomorphae
- Family: Linyphiidae
- Genus: Entelecara
- Species: E. acuminata

Binomial name
- Entelecara acuminata (Wider, 1834)

= Entelecara acuminata =

Species of spider

Entelecara acuminata is a species of dwarf spider in the family Linyphiidae. It is found in the United States, Europe, Russia (Sibiria), and Central Asia.
