= Styloctetor purpurescens =

Scientific classification
- Kingdom: Animalia
- Phylum: Arthropoda
- Subphylum: Chelicerata
- Class: Arachnida
- Order: Araneae
- Infraorder: Araneomorphae
- Family: Linyphiidae
- Genus: Styloctetor
- Species: S. purpurescens

Binomial name
- Styloctetor purpurescens (Keyserling, 1886)

Species of spider

Styloctetor purpurescens is a species of dwarf spider in the family Linyphiidae. It is found in the United States and Canada.
