= Poecilochroa capensis =

Cape Poecilochroa Ground Spider

Conservation status
- Least Concern (SANBI Red List)

Scientific classification
- Kingdom: Animalia
- Phylum: Arthropoda
- Subphylum: Chelicerata
- Class: Arachnida
- Order: Araneae
- Infraorder: Araneomorphae
- Family: Gnaphosidae
- Genus: Poecilochroa
- Species: P. capensis

Binomial name
- Poecilochroa capensis Strand, 1909

Species of spider

Poecilochroa capensis is a species of spider in the family Gnaphosidae. It is endemic to South Africa and is commonly known as Cape Poecilochroa ground spider.

== Distribution ==
Poecilochroa capensis is found in three South African provinces, KwaZulu-Natal, Northern Cape, and Western Cape. Notable locations include Ndumo Game Reserve, Green Valley Nuts Estate near Prieska, Springbok, Fish Hoek, and Table Mountain National Park.

== Habitat and ecology ==
The species is a free-living ground dweller found at altitudes ranging from 9 to 982 m above sea level. It has been sampled from Fynbos, Savanna, and Thicket biomes, as well as from pistachio orchards.

== Description ==
Known only from an immature female, this species has a carapace that is light brown to black with white appressed hairs. The sternum is pure black. The chelicerae are brown internally and lighter reddish apically. The ocular region is deep black, while the maxillae and labium are black with the former having a whitish anterior and inner border.

The legs are brownish black with yellow joints on legs I and II including the patellae onwards. The abdomen is deep black above with a weak metallic shimmer and pure white markings at the base.

== Conservation ==
Poecilochroa capensis is listed as Least Concern by the South African National Biodiversity Institute due to its wide geographical range. The species is protected in Ndumo Game Reserve and Table Mountain National Park.

== Etymology ==
The species name capensis refers to the Cape of Good Hope region where it was originally discovered.

== Taxonomy ==
The species was originally described by Embrik Strand in 1909 from Fish Hoek. It is currently known only from juvenile specimens.
