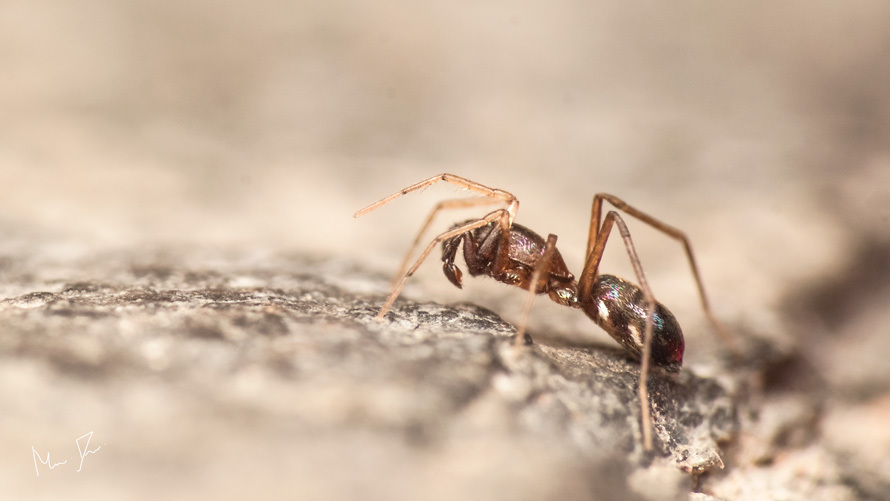
- Male Micaria dives

Scientific classification
- Kingdom: Animalia
- Phylum: Arthropoda
- Subphylum: Chelicerata
- Class: Arachnida
- Order: Araneae
- Infraorder: Araneomorphae
- Family: Gnaphosidae
- Genus: Micaria
- Species: M. dives

Binomial name
- Micaria dives (Lucas, 1846)

= Micaria dives =

Species of spider

Micaria dives is a species of ground spider in the family Gnaphosidae. It is a diurnal hunter. The body surface is glossy and often shows iridescent reflections, giving it a colorful appearance.

== Behavior ==
Unlike many ground spiders that are nocturnal, M. dives is active during the day. It does not spin capture webs, but actively hunts small invertebrates on open sandy surfaces. The species exhibits ant-like movements and posture, which may serve as a defense mechanism against predators.
