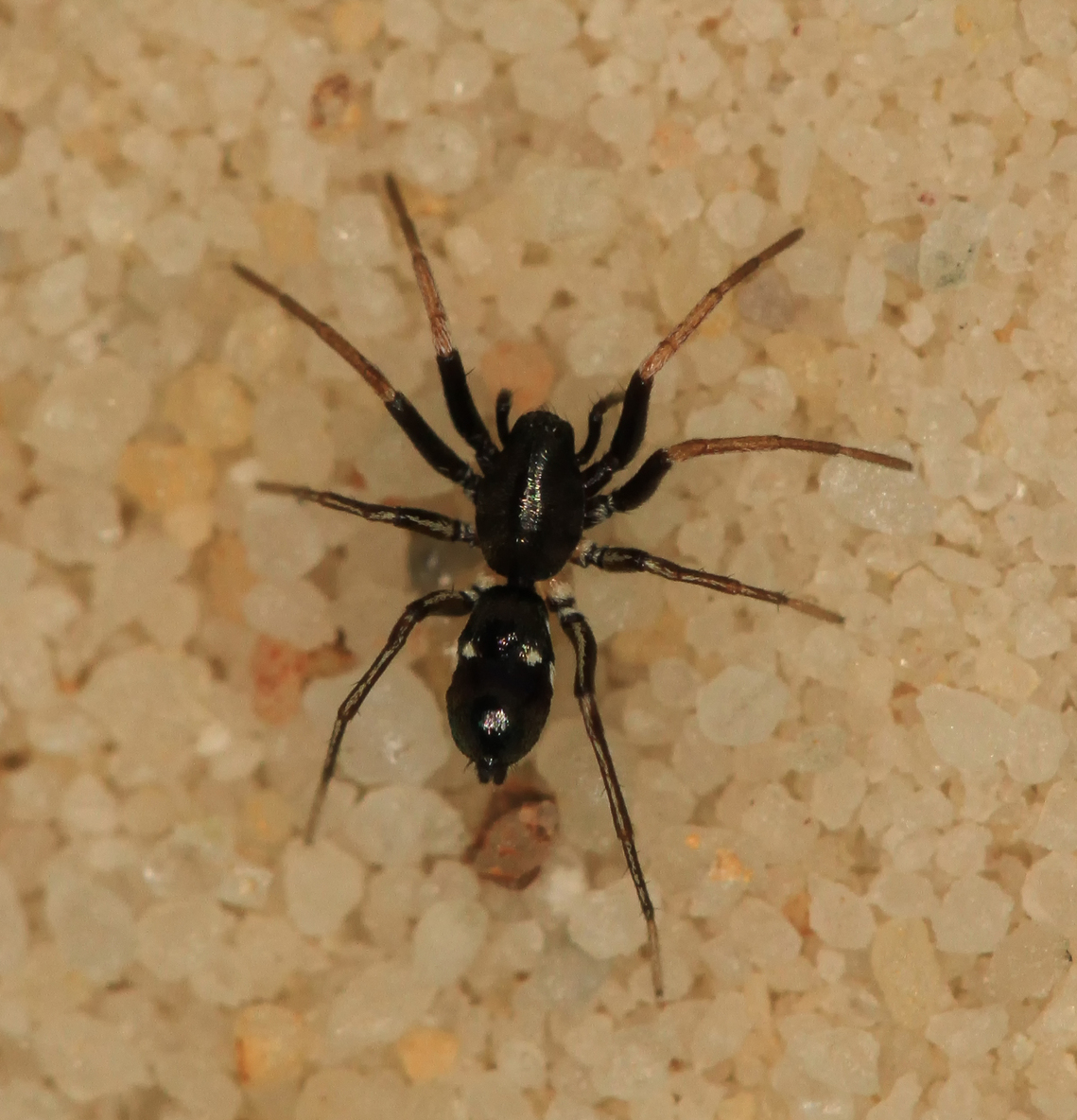
- male
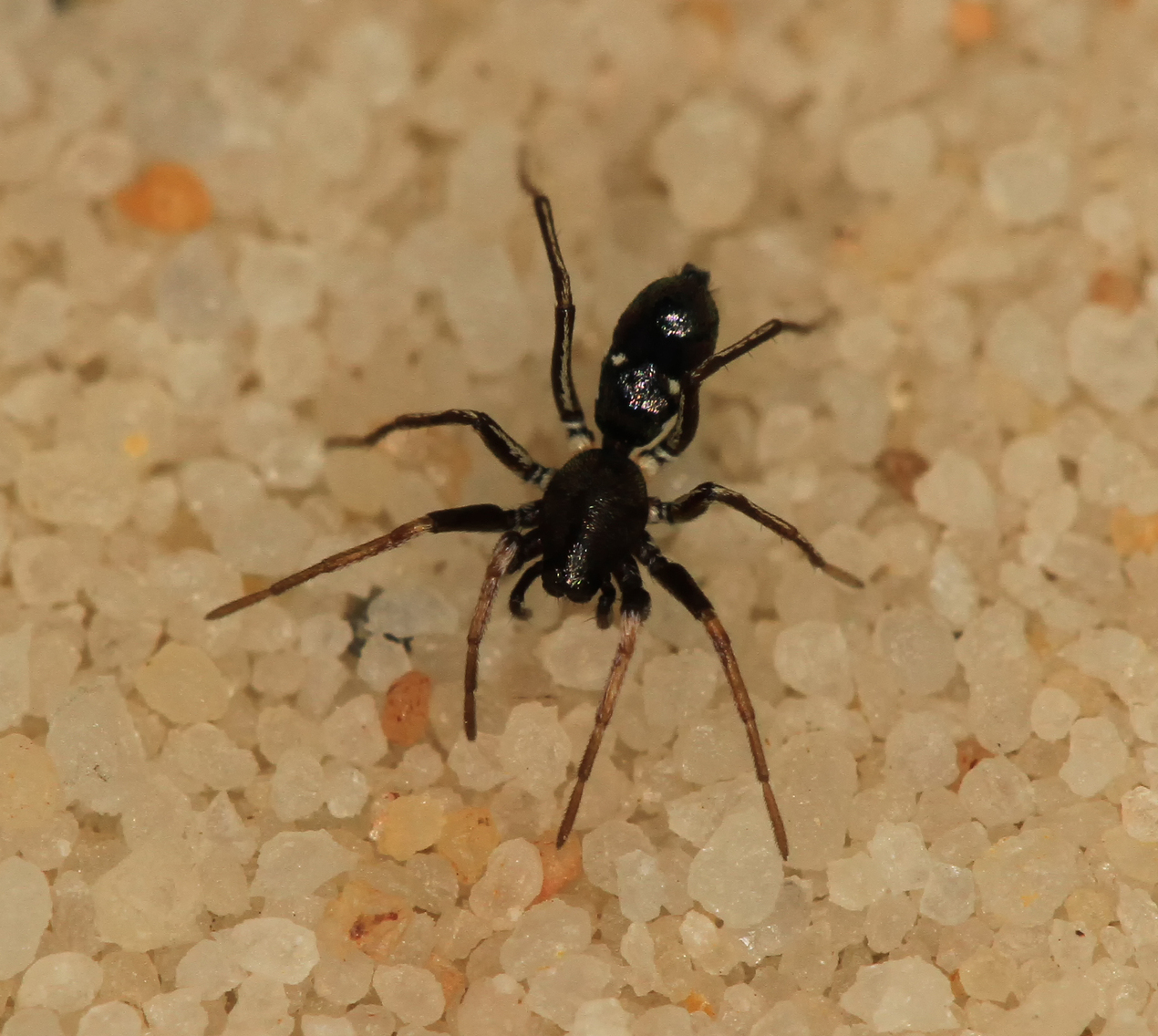
- male

Scientific classification
- Kingdom: Animalia
- Phylum: Arthropoda
- Subphylum: Chelicerata
- Class: Arachnida
- Order: Araneae
- Infraorder: Araneomorphae
- Family: Gnaphosidae
- Genus: Micaria
- Species: M. tersissima

Binomial name
- Micaria tersissima Simon, 1910

= Micaria tersissima =

Kamaggas Micaria Ground Spider

Species of spider

Micaria tersissima is a species of spider in the family Gnaphosidae. It is endemic to South Africa and is commonly known as the Kamaggas Micaria ground spider.

== Distribution ==
Micaria tersissima has a very restricted distribution in South Africa's Northern Cape province, with a very small range. The species is known only from the type locality at Kamaggas at an altitude of 231 m above sea level.

== Habitat and ecology ==
The species is a free-living ground dweller found in the Succulent Karoo biome.

== Description ==
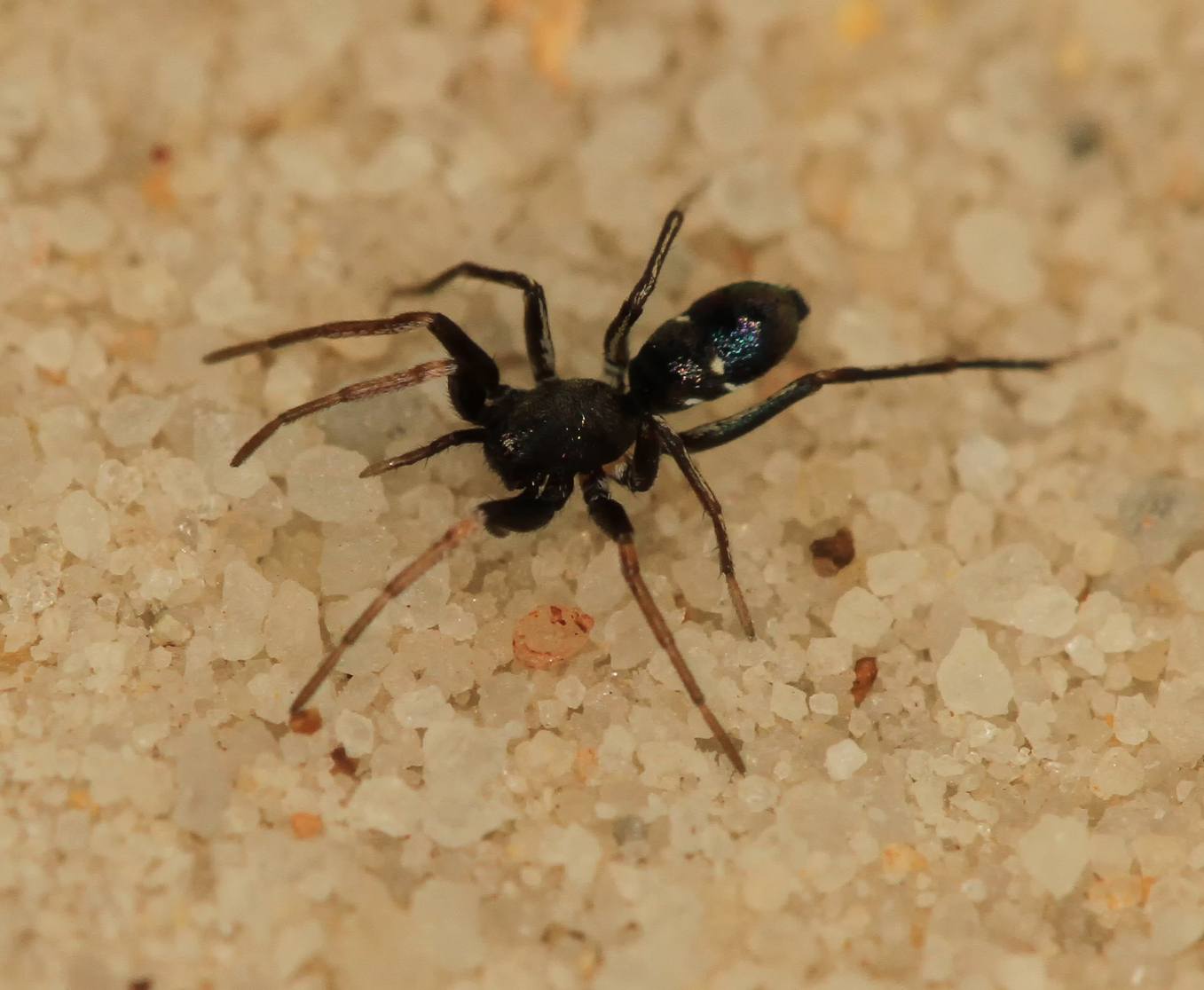
male

Only the male of M. tersissima is known. The species has dark brown legs and carapace and a black abdomen with two white spots medially. The anterior margin of the abdomen is truncated and legs III and IV have a white longitudinal median stripe.

== Conservation ==
Micaria tersissima is listed as Data Deficient for taxonomic reasons. The species has a very small range and too little is known about the location, habitat and threats for an assessment to be made. More sampling is needed to collect females and determine the species' actual range.

== Taxonomy ==
The species was described by Simon in 1910 from Kamaggas. The female remains unknown.
