= Micrargus longitarsus =

Scientific classification
- Domain: Eukaryota
- Kingdom: Animalia
- Phylum: Arthropoda
- Subphylum: Chelicerata
- Class: Arachnida
- Order: Araneae
- Infraorder: Araneomorphae
- Family: Linyphiidae
- Genus: Micrargus
- Species: M. longitarsus

Binomial name
- Micrargus longitarsus (Emerton, 1882)

Species of spider

Micrargus longitarsus is a species of dwarf spider in the family Linyphiidae. Found in the United States and Canada, it was first described by James Henry Emerton in 1882.
