= Poecilochroa anomala =

Poecilochroa Ground Spider

Conservation status
- Least Concern (SANBI Red List)

Scientific classification
- Kingdom: Animalia
- Phylum: Arthropoda
- Subphylum: Chelicerata
- Class: Arachnida
- Order: Araneae
- Infraorder: Araneomorphae
- Family: Gnaphosidae
- Genus: Poecilochroa
- Species: P. anomala

Binomial name
- Poecilochroa anomala (Hewitt, 1915)

Synonyms
- Xerophaeus anomalus Hewitt, 1915

Species of spider

Poecilochroa anomala is a species of spider in the family Gnaphosidae. It is endemic to southern Africa and is commonly known as Poecilochroa ground spider.

== Distribution ==
Poecilochroa anomala is found in Lesotho and South Africa. In South Africa, it is recorded from three provinces: Eastern Cape, KwaZulu-Natal, and Western Cape. Notable locations include Grahamstown, Kentani, Vernon Crookes Nature Reserve, De Hoop Nature Reserve, and Swartberg Nature Reserve.

== Habitat and ecology ==
The species is a free-living ground dweller found at altitudes ranging from sea level to 2,327 m above sea level. It has been sampled from Forest, Fynbos, Nama Karoo, and Thicket biomes.

== Description ==
Females have a carapace that is dark brown with radiate infuscations and mottling. The abdomen is testaceous and infuscated dorsally. The sternum and coxae are light brown. The femora of the legs are dark, while the patellae are pale yellow and the tibiae are pale brown. The femora I have a light patch. Total length is 6.4 mm.

== Conservation ==
Poecilochroa anomala is listed as Least Concern by the South African National Biodiversity Institute due to its wide geographical range. The species is protected in several nature reserves including Vernon Crookes Nature Reserve, De Hoop Nature Reserve, and Swartberg Nature Reserve.

== Taxonomy ==
The species was originally described by John Hewitt in 1915 as Xerophaeus anomalus from Pacaltsdorp in the Western Cape. It is currently known only from female specimens.
