= Micaria rossica =

Scientific classification
- Kingdom: Animalia
- Phylum: Arthropoda
- Subphylum: Chelicerata
- Class: Arachnida
- Order: Araneae
- Infraorder: Araneomorphae
- Family: Gnaphosidae
- Genus: Micaria
- Species: M. rossica

Binomial name
- Micaria rossica Thorell, 1875

Synonyms
- Micaria albocincta Banks, 1901; Micaria scenica Simon, 1878

Species of spider

Micaria rossica is a spider in the family Gnaphosidae ("ground spiders"), in the infraorder Araneomorphae ("true spiders"). The distribution range of Micaria rossica includes North America, Europe, Turkey, Caucasus, Russia to Central Asia, and China.
