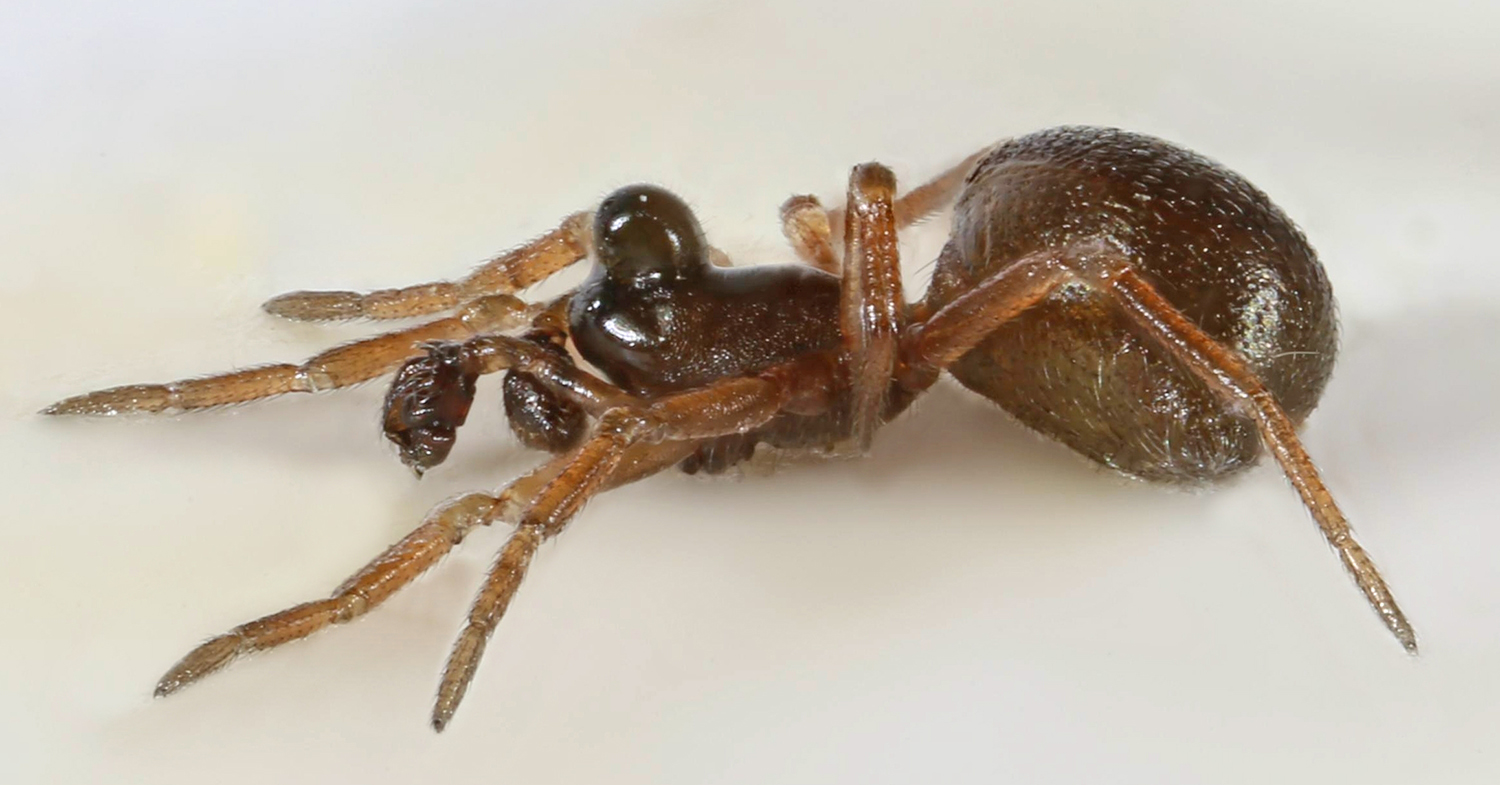
- P. nemoralis
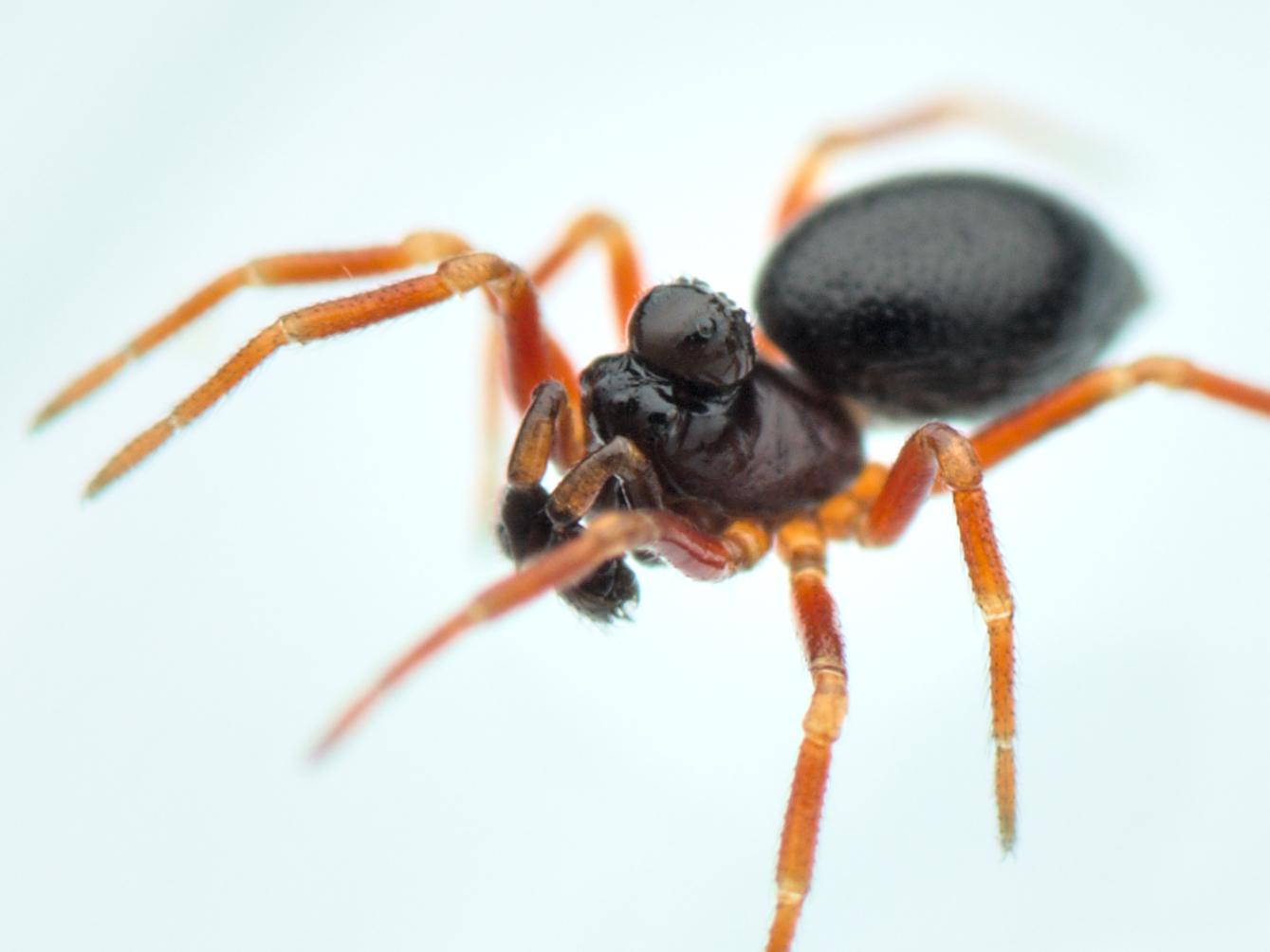
- P. inedita

Scientific classification
- Kingdom: Animalia
- Phylum: Arthropoda
- Subphylum: Chelicerata
- Class: Arachnida
- Order: Araneae
- Infraorder: Araneomorphae
- Family: Linyphiidae
- Genus: Pelecopsis; Simon, 1864

Type species
- P. elongata (Wider, 1834)

Species
- 90, see text

Synonyms
- Exechophysis Simon, 1884; Lophocarenum Menge, 1866

= Pelecopsis =

Genus of spiders

Pelecopsis is a genus of dwarf spiders that was first described by Eugène Louis Simon in 1864.

Most species are found in Africa, Europe and Asia, with endemic to North America.

== Species ==
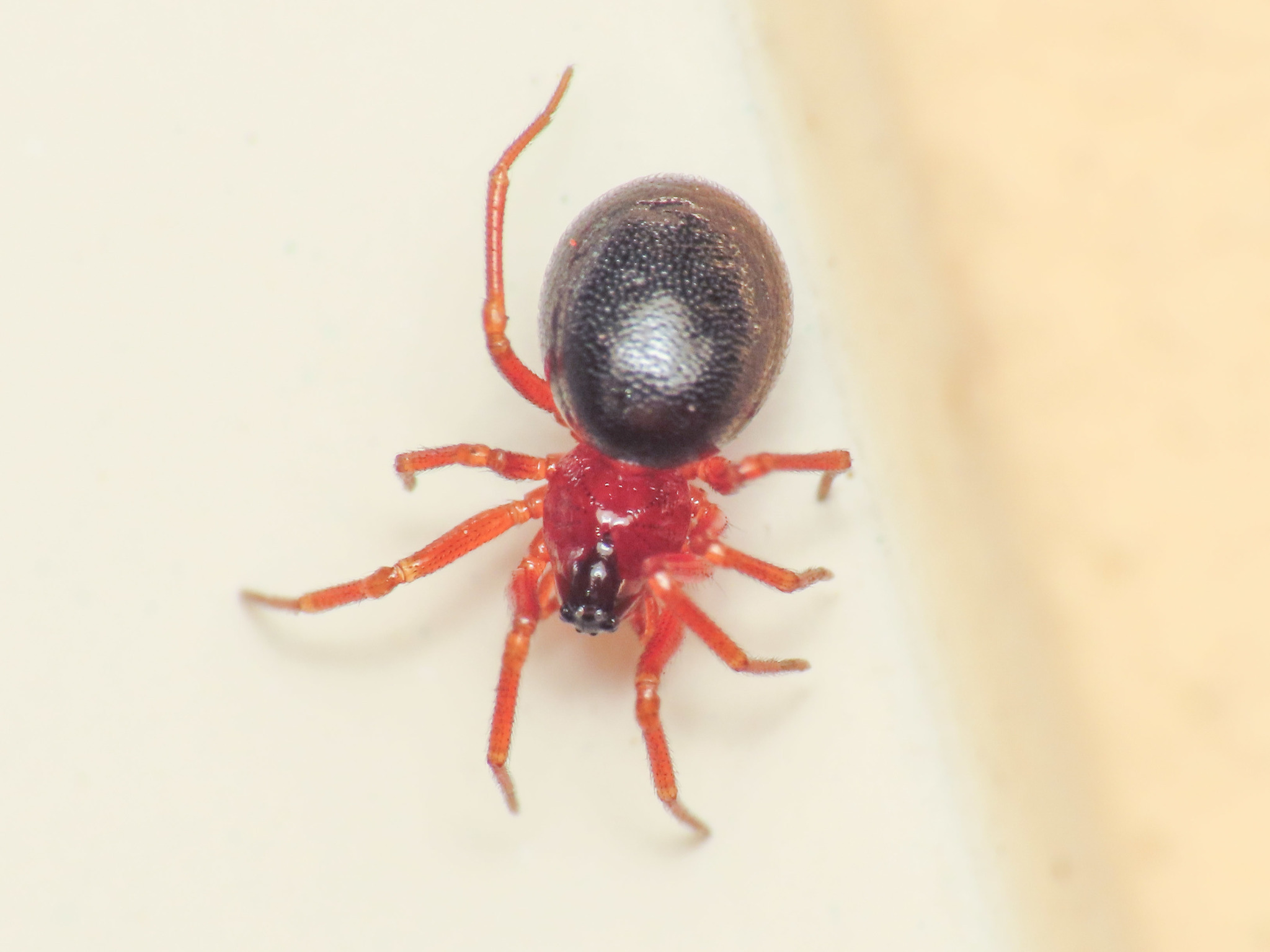
P. bucephala

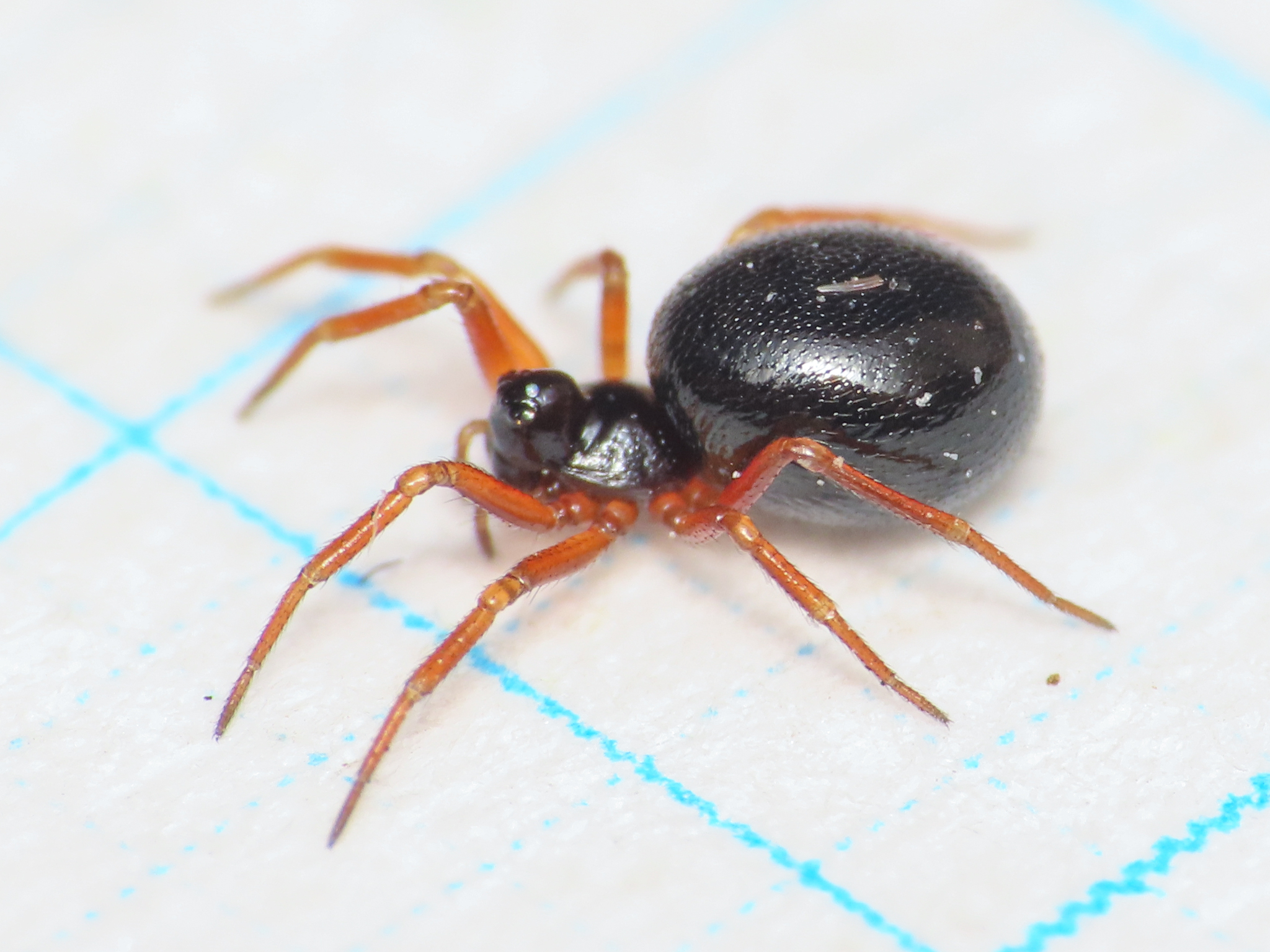
P. elongata

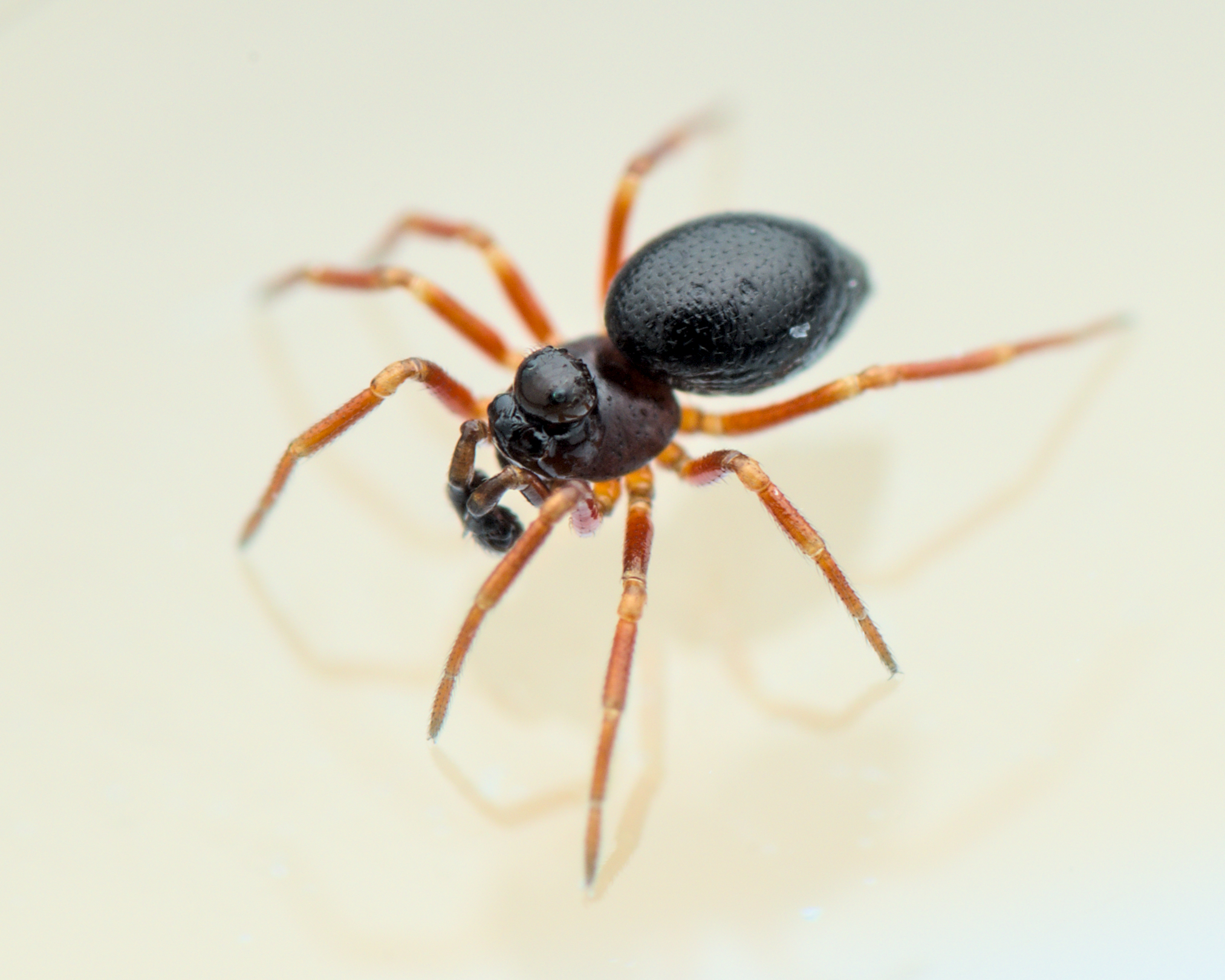
P. inedita

As of October 2025, this genus includes ninety species and four subspecies:

- Pelecopsis agaetensis Wunderlich, 1987 – Canary Islands
- Pelecopsis albifrons Holm, 1979 – Kenya
- Pelecopsis alpica Thaler, 1991 – Alps (Switzerland, Austria, Italy)
- Pelecopsis alticola (Berland, 1936) – Kenya
  - P. a. elgonensis (Holm, 1962) – Uganda
  - P. a. kenyensis (Holm, 1962) – Kenya
  - P. a. kivuensis (Miller, 1970) – DR Congo
- Pelecopsis amabilis (Simon, 1884) – Algeria
- Pelecopsis arsi Tanasevitch, 2023 – Ethiopia
- Pelecopsis aureipes Denis, 1962 – Morocco
- Pelecopsis biceps (Holm, 1962) – Tanzania
- Pelecopsis bicornuta Hillyard, 1980 – Portugal, Spain, Morocco
- Pelecopsis bigibba Seo, 2018 – Korea
- Pelecopsis bishopi Kaston, 1945 – Canada, United States
- Pelecopsis brunea Seo, 2018 – Korea
- Pelecopsis bucephala (O. Pickard-Cambridge, 1875) – Western Mediterranean
- Pelecopsis capitata (Simon, 1884) – France
- Pelecopsis cedricola Bosmans & Abrous, 1992 – Algeria
- Pelecopsis coccinea (O. Pickard-Cambridge, 1875) – Spain, Morocco
- Pelecopsis crassipes Tanasevitch, 1987 – Caucasus (Russia, Georgia, Armenia, Azerbaijan)
- Pelecopsis denisi Brignoli, 1983 – Pyrenees (Andorra, France)
- Pelecopsis digitulus Bosmans & Abrous, 1992 – Algeria, France (Corsica), Italy
- Pelecopsis dorniana Heimer, 1987 – Russia (Middle Siberia to Far North East), Mongolia
- Pelecopsis elongata (Wider, 1834) – Europe, Turkey, Israel (type species)
- Pelecopsis eminula (Simon, 1884) – Italy, Spain?
- Pelecopsis flava Holm, 1962 – Uganda, Congo
- Pelecopsis fornicata Miller, 1970 – Congo
- Pelecopsis fulva Holm, 1962 – Uganda
- Pelecopsis hamata Bosmans, 1988 – Cameroon
- Pelecopsis hillyardi Wunderlich, 2024 – Portugal
- Pelecopsis hipporegia (Denis, 1968) – Algeria, Tunisia
- Pelecopsis humiliceps Holm, 1979 – Kenya, Uganda
- Pelecopsis indus Tanasevitch, 2011 – Pakistan, India
- Pelecopsis inedita (O. Pickard-Cambridge, 1875) – Canary Islands, Mediterranean
- Pelecopsis infusca Holm, 1962 – Uganda
- Pelecopsis intricata Jocqué, 1984 – South Africa
- Pelecopsis janus Jocqué, 1984 – South Africa, Lesotho
- Pelecopsis kabyliana Bosmans & Abrous, 1992 – Algeria
- Pelecopsis kalaensis Bosmans & Abrous, 1992 – Algeria
- Pelecopsis laptevi Tanasevitch & Fet, 1986 – North Macedonia, Bulgaria, Ukraine, Iran, Kazakhstan, Turkmenistan
- Pelecopsis leonina (Simon, 1884) – Algeria
- Pelecopsis levantensis Tanasevitch, 2016 – Israel
- Pelecopsis litoralis Wunderlich, 1987 – Canary Islands
- Pelecopsis loksai Szinetár & Samu, 2003 – Slovakia, Hungary, Serbia, North Macedonia, Bulgaria
- Pelecopsis lunaris Bosmans & Abrous, 1992 – Algeria
- Pelecopsis major (Denis, 1945) – Algeria
- Pelecopsis malawiensis Jocqué, 1977 – Malawi
- Pelecopsis margaretae Georgescu, 1975 – Romania
- Pelecopsis medusoides Jocqué, 1984 – South Africa
- Pelecopsis mengei (Simon, 1884) – North America, Europe, Turkey, Russia (Europe to Far East), Japan
- Pelecopsis minor Wunderlich, 1995 – Mongolia
- Pelecopsis modica Hillyard, 1980 – Spain, Morocco
- Pelecopsis moesta (Banks, 1892) – Canada, United States
- Pelecopsis monsantensis Bosmans & Crespo, 2010 – Portugal, Spain
- Pelecopsis moschensis (Caporiacco, 1947) – Tanzania
- Pelecopsis mutica Denis, 1958 – France
- Pelecopsis nigriceps Holm, 1962 – Kenya, Uganda
- Pelecopsis nigroloba Fei, Gao & Zhu, 1995 – Russia (Far East), China
- Pelecopsis odontophora (Kulczyński, 1895) – Georgia
- Pelecopsis oranensis (Simon, 1884) – Morocco, Algeria
- Pelecopsis oujda Bosmans & Abrous, 1992 – Morocco, Algeria
- Pelecopsis pakistanicus Tanasevitch, 2025 – Pakistan
- Pelecopsis palmgreni Marusik & Esyunin, 1998 – Russia (Central Asia, South Siberia), Kazakhstan
- Pelecopsis papillii Scharff, 1990 – Tanzania
- Pelecopsis parallela (Wider, 1834) – Azores, Europe, Turkey, Russia (Europe to Far East), Georgia, Kazakhstan, Iran, Kyrgyzstan
- Pelecopsis paralleloides Tanasevitch & Fet, 1986 – Central Asia
- Pelecopsis partita Denis, 1954 – France
- Pelecopsis parvicollis Wunderlich, 1995 – Mongolia
- Pelecopsis parvioculis Miller, 1970 – Angola
- Pelecopsis pasteuri (Berland, 1936) – Kenya, Tanzania
- Pelecopsis pavesii Bosmans & Hervé, 2021 – Tunisia
- Pelecopsis pavida (O. Pickard-Cambridge, 1872) – Greece, Israel
- Pelecopsis physeter (Fage, 1936) – Congo, Rwanda, Kenya, Tanzania
- Pelecopsis pooti Bosmans & Jocqué, 1993 – Spain
- Pelecopsis proclinata Bosmans, 1988 – Cameroon
- Pelecopsis punctilineata Holm, 1964 – Congo, Rwanda
- Pelecopsis punctiseriata (Bösenberg & Strand, 1906) – Japan
- Pelecopsis radicicola (L. Koch, 1872) – Europe
- Pelecopsis reclinata (Holm, 1962) – Kenya, Uganda
- Pelecopsis riffensis Bosmans & Abrous, 1992 – Morocco
- Pelecopsis robusta Weiss, 1990 – Romania
- Pelecopsis ruwenzoriensis (Holm, 1962) – Uganda
- Pelecopsis sanje Scharff, 1990 – Tanzania
- Pelecopsis sculpta (Emerton, 1917) – Alaska, Canada
  - P. s. digna Chamberlin & Ivie, 1939 – United States
- Pelecopsis senecicola Holm, 1962 – Uganda
- Pelecopsis seoi Blick & Sherwood, 2021 – Korea
- Pelecopsis subflava Russell-Smith & Jocqué, 1986 – Kenya
- Pelecopsis suilla (Simon, 1884) – Algeria
- Pelecopsis tenuipalpis Holm, 1979 – Uganda
- Pelecopsis topcui (Türkeş, Karabulut, Demir & Seyyar, 2015) – Turkey
- Pelecopsis tybaertielloides Jocqué, 1984 – Kenya
- Pelecopsis uintana (Chamberlin, 1949) – United States
- Pelecopsis varians (Holm, 1962) – Kenya, Uganda
