= Niklas Westring =

Swedish entomologist and arachnologist

- Born: 13 November 1797; Gothenburg
- Died: 18 January 1882 (aged 84); Gothenburg
- Scientific career
- Fields: Zoologist, arachnologist
- Workplaces: Göteborg City Museum
- Author abbrev. (zoology): Westring

Niklas Westring (13 November 1797, in Gothenburg – 28 January 1882) was a Swedish entomologist and arachnologist.

He started out with the intention to study medicine but this was frustrated by the death of his father. His full-time profession from 1816 was as a customs officer in Gothenburg, where he was customs administrator from 1834 to 1856. When he retired he spent most of his time working on natural history, especially from 1840 to 1862, during which time he also became a conservator at the Göteborg Natural History Museum.

He is best known for his book Araneae suecicae descriptae in 1862 in which he described 308 species of spider found in Sweden. Of these, 124 had already been described by Carl Linnaeus, Charles De Geer and Carl Jakob Sundevall. He appears to have been something of a mentor to Tamerlan Thorell who lived in Gothernborg until he went to university at Uppsala and was familiar with Westring's collection of spiders and how to identify them since he had been a schoolboy.

He was one of the founders and most active promoters of the Göteborg City Museum, serving on its board from 1840 to 1874. He became a member of the Royal Society of Sciences and Letters in Gothenburg in 1843, a member of the Royal Swedish Academy of Sciences in 1863 and several foreign entomological associations.

Westring was married to Bridget Christina Thorsell but was a widower when he died. He did not have any children but appears to have fostered a relative of his wife, Johan Peterson, to whom he left the bulk of his estate. When he died he bequeathed his collections of specimens and library to the Göteborg Natural History Museum. He also left a cabinet made of mahogany which contained some specimens, including many type specimens, to the Royal Swedish Academy of Sciences, this cabinet is now in the Swedish Museum of Natural History.

== Publications ==
This is an incomplete list.

- Westring (N.) (Nicolas), 1843. - (Om' Stridulationsorganet hos Asagena serratipes Schrk.). Nat. Tidsskr., 4, pp. 349–360.
- Westring (N.), 1847. - Bidrag till Historien om Insekternes Stridulations-Organer. Nat. Tidsskr., (2) 2 (4), pp. 334–345.
- Westring, N. (1851). Förteckning öfver de till närvarande tid Kände, i Sverige förekommande Spindlarter, utgörande ett antal af 253, deraf 132 äro nya för svenska Faunan. Göteborgs Kungliga Vetenskaps och Vitterhets Samhälles Handlingar 2: 25-62
- Westring, N. (1861). Araneae svecieae. Göteborgs Kungliga Vetenskaps och Vitterhets Samhälles Handlingar 7: 1-615
- Westring, Niklaus (1862), Araneae Suecicae descriptae. Bonnier, ISBN 978-1130275674
- Westring, N. (1874). Bemerkungen über die Arachnologischen Abhandlungen von Dr T. Thorell unter dem Titel: 1°, On European Spiders, pts 1 et 2, Upsala, 1869-70. 2°, Remarks on Synonyms of European Spiders, Upsala, 1872-73. Göteborgs Kungliga Vetenskaps och Vitterhets Samhälles Handlingar 14: 1-68
