= List of Titanoecidae species =

This page lists all described species of the spider family Titanoecidae accepted by the World Spider Catalog as of January 2021:

== Anuvinda ==
Anuvinda Lehtinen, 1967

- A. escheri (Reimoser, 1934) (type) — India, China, Laos, Thailand
- A. milloti (Hubert, 1973) — Nepal

== Goeldia ==
Goeldia Keyserling, 1891

- G. arnozoi (Mello-Leitão, 1924) — Brazil
- G. chinipensis Leech, 1972 — Mexico
- G. luteipes (Keyserling, 1891) — Brazil, Argentina
- G. mexicana (O. Pickard-Cambridge, 1896) — Mexico
- G. nigra (Mello-Leitão, 1917) — Brazil
- G. obscura (Keyserling, 1878) — Colombia, Peru
- G. patellaris (Simon, 1893) (type) — Venezuela to Chile
- G. tizamina (Chamberlin & Ivie, 1938) — Mexico
- G. zyngierae Almeida-Silva, Brescovit & Dias, 2009 — Brazil

== Nurscia ==
Nurscia

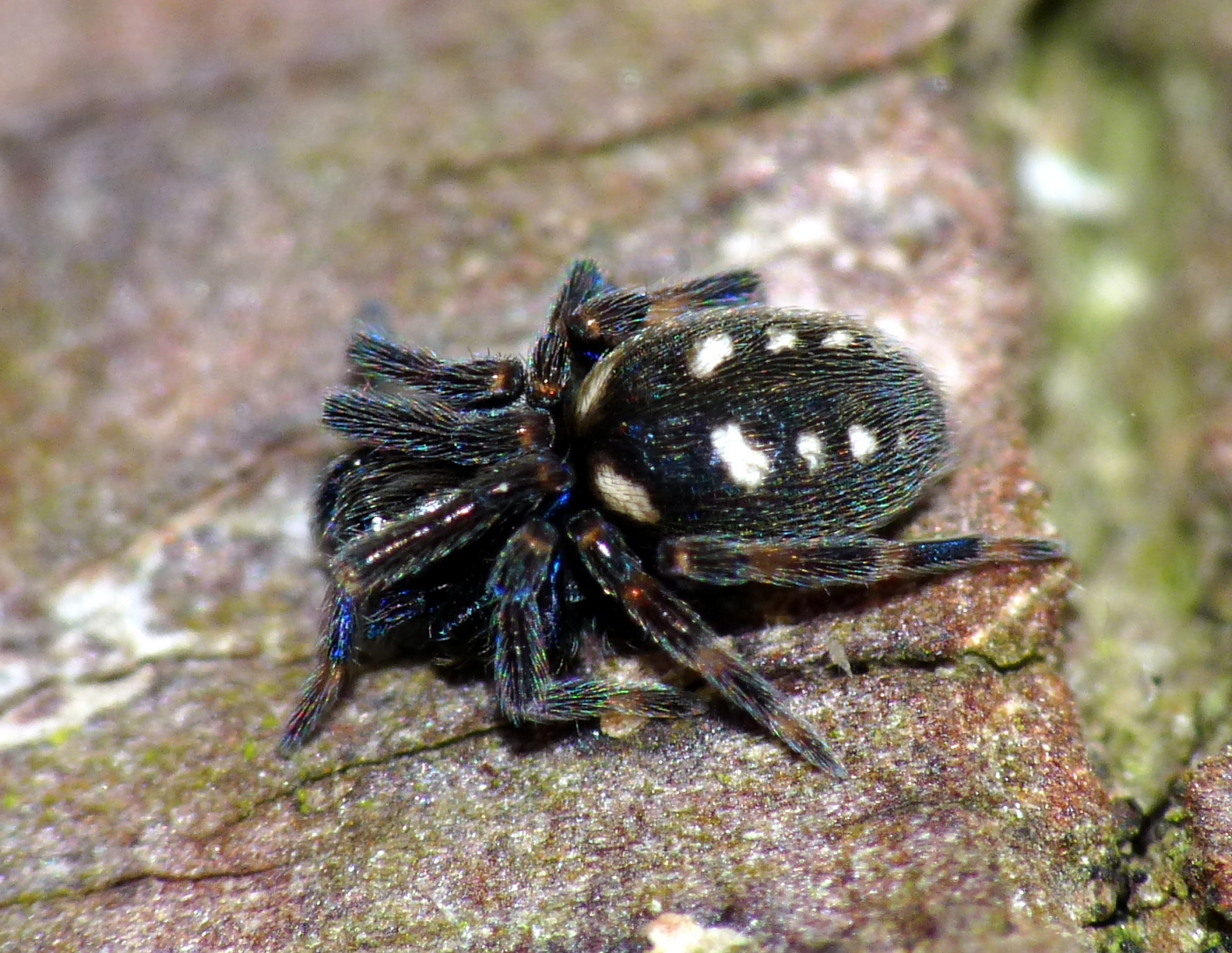
Nurscia albomaculata

Nurscia Simon, 1874

- N. albofasciata (Strand, 1907) — Russia (Far East), China, Korea, Taiwan, Japan
- N. albomaculata (Lucas, 1846) — Europe, Turkey, Egypt to Central Asia
- N. albosignata Simon, 1874 (type) — South-eastern and eastern Europe to Central Asia
- N. sequerai (Simon, 1893) — Portugal to France

== Pandava ==
Pandava

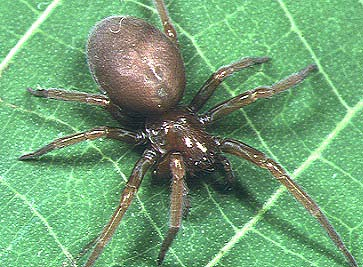
Pandava laminata, female

Pandava Lehtinen, 1967

- P. andhraca (Patel & Reddy, 1990) — India
- P. aruni Bodkhe, Uniyal, Kamble, Manthen, Santape & Chikhale, 2017 — India
- P. ganesha Almeida-Silva, Griswold & Brescovit, 2010 — India
- P. ganga Almeida-Silva, Griswold & Brescovit, 2010 — India
- P. hunanensis Yin & Bao, 2001 — China
- P. kama Almeida-Silva, Griswold & Brescovit, 2010 — India
- P. laminata (Thorell, 1878) (type) — Tanzania, Kenya, Madagascar, India, Sri Lanka to China, Indonesia, Philippines, Micronesia, French Polynesia. Introduced to Britain, Netherlands, Germany, Poland, Hungary
- P. nathabhaii (Patel & Patel, 1975) — India
- P. sarasvati Almeida-Silva, Griswold & Brescovit, 2010 — Myanmar, Thailand
- P. shiva Almeida-Silva, Griswold & Brescovit, 2010 — India, Pakistan

== † Scytodes ==
† Scytodes Latreille, 1804

- † S. marginalis Wunderlich, 2004
- † S. piliformis Wunderlich, 1988
- † S. planithorax Wunderlich, 1988
- † S. stridulans Wunderlich, 1988
- † S. weitschati Wunderlich, 1993

== Titanoeca ==
Titanoeca

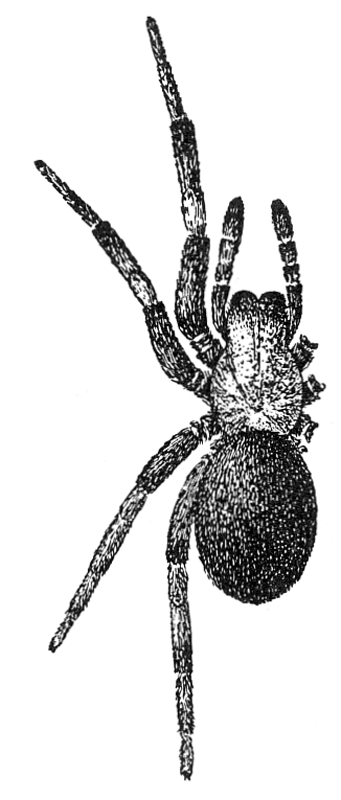
Titanoeca americana

Titanoeca Thorell, 1870

- T. altaica Song & Zhou, 1994 — China
- T. americana Emerton, 1888 — North America
- T. asimilis Song & Zhu, 1985 — Russia (South Siberia), Kazakhstan, Mongolia, China
- T. brunnea Emerton, 1888 — USA, Canada
- T. caspia Ponomarev, 2020 — Russia (Europe, Caucasus)
- T. caucasica Dunin, 1985 — Azerbaijan, Turkey, Iran
- T. deltshevi Naumova, 2019 — Bulgaria
- T. eca Marusik, 1995 — Kazakhstan
- T. flavicoma L. Koch, 1872 — France (Corsica), Italy, Albania, North Macedonia, Bulgaria, Greece, Russia (Europe)
- T. guayaquilensis Schmidt, 1971 — Ecuador
- T. gyirongensis Hu, 2001 — China
- T. hispanica Wunderlich, 1995 — Spain, France
- T. incerta (Nosek, 1905) — Turkey
- T. lehtineni Fet, 1986 — Central Asia, Iran?
- T. lianyuanensis Xu, Yin & Bao, 2002 — China
- T. liaoningensis Zhu, Gao & Guan, 1993 — Russia (South Siberia), Mongolia, China
- T. mae Song, Zhang & Zhu, 2002 — China
- T. minuta Marusik, 1995 — Kazakhstan
- T. monticola (Simon, 1870) — Portugal, Spain, France
- T. nigrella (Chamberlin, 1919) — North America
- T. nivalis Simon, 1874 — North America, Scandinavia, Pyrenees (Spain, France), Alps (France, Switzerland, Austria, Italy), Georgia, Russia (Middle Siberia to Far East)
- T. praefica (Simon, 1870) — Portugal, Spain, France, Algeria, Russia (Europe)
- T. quadriguttata (Hahn, 1833) (type) — Europe, Russia (Europe to South Siberia), Kazakhstan, China
- T. schineri L. Koch, 1872 — Europe, Turkey, Caucasus, Russia (Europe to South Siberia), Iran, Central Asia
- T. sharmai (Bastawade, 2008) — India
- T. spominima (Taczanowski, 1866) — Sweden, Central Europe
- T. tristis L. Koch, 1872 — Europe, Caucasus
- T. turkmenia Wunderlich, 1995 — Albania, Bulgaria, Greece, Russia (Europe), Kazakhstan, Iran, Turkmenistan
- T. ukrainica Guryanova, 1992 — Ukraine, Russia (Europe)
- T. veteranica Herman, 1879 — Central, South-eastern and Eastern Europe, Russia (Europe to South Siberia), Azerbaijan, Kazakhstan, Turkmenistan
