= Pluto (disambiguation) =

Pluto is a dwarf planet in the Solar System.

Pluto may also refer to:

== Greek mythology ==
- Pluto (mythology), god who rules the underworld, Roman equivalent of Hades
- Pluto (mother of Tantalus)
- Pluto (Oceanid)

== Places in the United States ==
- Pluto, Mississippi
- Pluto, West Virginia

== People ==
- Derek Murray (sports presenter) or "Pluto", Scottish sports journalist and commentator
- Terry Pluto (born 1955), American sportswriter
- Pluto Shervington (1950–2024), Jamaican reggae entertainer

== Arts, entertainment, and media ==
=== Fictional characters ===
- Pluto (Astro Boy), a character in Astro Boy
- Pluto (Disney), a Disney dog character created in 1930
- Pluto (Marvel Comics), a character in Marvel Comics
- Pluto (The Hills Have Eyes), a character in the horror franchise
- Sailor Pluto, a character in the Sailor Moon franchise

=== Music ===
==== Groups and labels ====
- Pluto (Canadian band), 1993–1999
- Pluto (New Zealand band), formed in 1994
- Pluto (Portuguese band), formed in 2004
- Pluto (UK band), a 1970s British band featuring Alan Warner
- Pluto Records, a record label

==== Albums ====
- Pluto (EP), an EP by Seigmen
- Pluto (album), a 2012 album by Future

==== Songs and compositions ====
- "Pluto" (orchestral movement), an expansion by Colin Matthews for Gustav Holst's The Planets
- "Pluto" (song), by Björk, 1997
- "Pluto", by 2 Skinnee J's from SuperMercado!
- "Pluto", by Naughty Boy from Hotel Cabana
- "Pluto", by Melanie Martinez from the deluxe edition of Portals

=== Other uses in arts, entertainment, and media ===
- Pluto (2012 film), a South Korean film
- Pluto (2026 film), an Indian Malayalam comedy sci-fi film
- Pluto (film series), an animated series, 1937–1951
- Pluto: Urasawa x Tezuka, a manga series by Naoki Urasawa based on Astro Boy
  - Pluto (Japanese TV series) based on the manga series
- Pluto (newspaper), the student newspaper at the University of Central Lancashire
- Pluto Press, a British publishing house
- Pluto TV, a free online television service
- Pluto (Thai TV series), a Thai girls' love television series

== Military ==
- HMS Pluto, a list of ships of the Royal Navy
- Operation Pluto, World War II undersea oil pipelines between England and France
- Project Pluto, a U.S. nuclear powered cruise missile

== Science and technology ==
- Pluto (wasp), a genus of wasps in the family Crabronidae
- Argyrodes pluto, a species of cobweb spider in the family Theridiidae
- Callilepis pluto, a species of ground spider in the family Gnaphosidae
- Pluto euptera, a species of butterfly in the family Nymphalidae
- Fodinoidea pluto, a species of moth in the family Erebidae
- Megachile pluto, also known as Wallace's giant bee or raja ofu/rotu ofu, a species of bee in the family Megachilidae
- PLUTO detector, a particle detector that was operated at DESY in the 1970s
- PLUTO reactor, a nuclear reactor at Harwell, Oxfordshire
- Pluto.jl, a notebook (programming environment) for Julia (programming language)

== Transportation ==
- Pluto, a South Devon Railway Gorgon class 4-4-0ST steam locomotive
- Bortolanza Pluto, an Italian ultralight aircraft

== Other uses ==
- Pluto (astrology), the ruling planet of the astrological sign Scorpio
- Pluto Peak, a mountain in New Zealand
- Pluto Water, a laxative product popular in the United States in the early 20th century

== See also ==
- Pluton (disambiguation)
- Plutus (disambiguation)
