= Pluto (comics) =

Comics name

Pluto, in comics, may refer to:

- Pluto (Marvel Comics), a Marvel Comics supervillain and fictional god
- Pluto (Disney), a Disney character and pet of Mickey Mouse who has appeared in various comic book adaptations
- Pluto (Astro Boy), a villain in the Astro Boy manga
- Pluto (manga), an Astro Boy spin-off named after the character

== See also ==
- Pluto (disambiguation)
