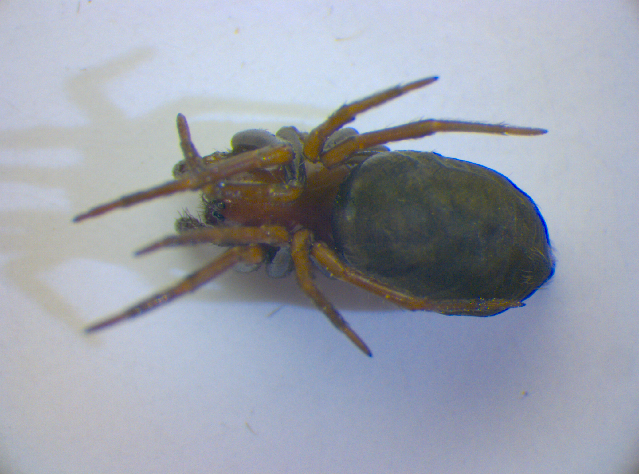
- T. quadriguttata

Scientific classification
- Kingdom: Animalia
- Phylum: Arthropoda
- Subphylum: Chelicerata
- Class: Arachnida
- Order: Araneae
- Infraorder: Araneomorphae
- Family: Titanoecidae
- Genus: Titanoeca
- Species: T. quadriguttata

Binomial name
- Titanoeca quadriguttata (Hahn, 1833)

Synonyms
- Aranea obscura Theridion obscurum Theridion 4-guttatum Theridion notatum Latrodectus 4-guttatus Theridion ardesiacum Eucharium obscurum Amaurobius kochi Titanoeca kochii Amaurobius quadriguttata Ciniflo IV-guttatus; Titanoeca obscura

= Titanoeca quadriguttata =

Species of spider

Titanoeca quadriguttata is a species of spider in the family Titanoecidae. It is widespread in Europe, though absent from Great Britain, and is found in Austria, Belgium, Bulgaria, Corsica, Croatia, Czech Republic, France, Germany, Greece, Hungary, Italy, Liechtenstein, Moldova, Russia, Slovakia, Spain, Switzerland, the Netherlands, Ukraine.

The females of the species are approximately 6 mm long and have a dark brownish plain abdomen and dark cephalothorax. Males are about 4.5 mm and have a broad light reddish brown cephalothorax and a slimmer black abdomen with two pairs of shining white dots.

Though similar in general appearance to Titanoeca psammophila, it is larger and the epigyne and male palpal organs are distinctive, as is the palpal tibia, viewed from above and the male lacks the spots. Like the rest of the genus, the spider has a calamistrum on the metatarsus of the fourth pair of legs, which comprises a single row of bristles and extends along most of its length.

The spiders are mature in spring; adults can be found from May to July in limestone areas of Germany.

It is often found amongst leaf litter or under logs and stones where the spiders have retreats and an open-meshed cribellate web extends around the opening. Males tug at the threads of females' webs prior to mating. The female remains with the egg sac in the retreat.

The male resembles superficially the male of Callilepis schuszteri (Gnaphosidae), but the latter has protruding spinnerets and a silvery carapax.

== Taxonomy ==
T. quadriguttata was originally described as Aranea obscura by Walckenaer in 1802. However, this proved to be preoccupied by Olivier, 1789 and Fabricius, 1793. Hahn described the species as Theridion 4-guttatum in 1833, from which the recent name is derived. There is another species, Goeldia obscura, that has been known by this name.
