= Goeldia obscura =

Scientific classification
- Domain: Eukaryota
- Kingdom: Animalia
- Phylum: Arthropoda
- Subphylum: Chelicerata
- Class: Arachnida
- Order: Araneae
- Infraorder: Araneomorphae
- Family: Titanoecidae
- Genus: Goeldia
- Species: G. obscura

Binomial name
- Goeldia obscura (Keyserling, 1878)

Synonyms
- Titanoeca obscura Titanoeca funesta Amaurobius obscurus Auximus funestus Goeldia funesta

Species of spider

Goeldia obscura is a spider species from Colombia and Peru. It is not to be confused with Titanoeca quadriguttata from Europe; both shared the name Titanoeca obscura, but at different times. While G. obscura was never cited as T. obscura since its original description in 1878, T. quadriguttata was cited as T. obscura in various papers from 1932 to 1993, and can be found under this name in later, non-scientific works.
