= Gnaphosa saurica =

Scientific classification
- Kingdom: Animalia
- Phylum: Arthropoda
- Subphylum: Chelicerata
- Class: Arachnida
- Order: Araneae
- Infraorder: Araneomorphae
- Family: Gnaphosidae
- Genus: Gnaphosa
- Species: G. saurica

Binomial name
- Gnaphosa saurica Ovtsharenko, Platnick & Song, 1992

Species of spider

Gnaphosa saurica is a ground spider species found in Russia, Ukraine, Georgia and Central Asia.
