= Gnaphosa alpica =

Scientific classification
- Kingdom: Animalia
- Phylum: Arthropoda
- Subphylum: Chelicerata
- Class: Arachnida
- Order: Araneae
- Infraorder: Araneomorphae
- Family: Gnaphosidae
- Genus: Gnaphosa
- Species: G. alpica

Binomial name
- Gnaphosa alpica Simon, 1878

Species of spider

Gnaphosa alpica is a ground spider species found in Europe, primarily found in the alpine grasslands of Switzerland and in France. Gnaphosa alpica was first described as a species by French naturalist and arachnologist Eugène Simon(1848-1924). Today, Gnaphosa alpica's range is threatened by shrinking alpine grassland habitats in Europe.

== Description ==
Gnaphosa alpica typically measures 8.2 mm long and 2.9 mm wide. Its frontquarters are brown and its hindquarters are grey-black.
