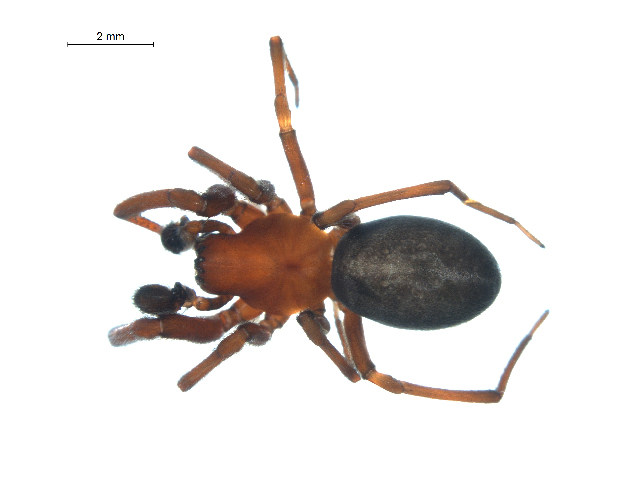
- T. nigrella, adult male
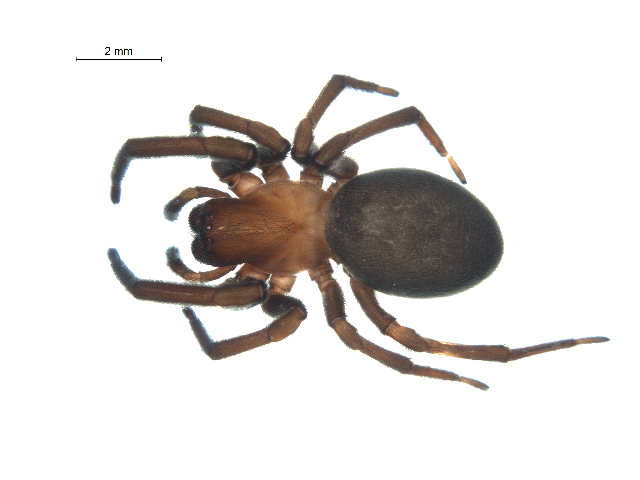
- T. nigrella, adult female

Scientific classification
- Kingdom: Animalia
- Phylum: Arthropoda
- Subphylum: Chelicerata
- Class: Arachnida
- Order: Araneae
- Infraorder: Araneomorphae
- Family: Titanoecidae
- Genus: Titanoeca
- Species: T. nigrella

Binomial name
- Titanoeca nigrella (Chamberlin, 1919)

= Titanoeca nigrella =

Species of spider

Titanoeca nigrella is a species of true spider in the family Titanoecidae. It is found in North America.
