= Gnaphosa alacris =

Scientific classification
- Kingdom: Animalia
- Phylum: Arthropoda
- Subphylum: Chelicerata
- Class: Arachnida
- Order: Araneae
- Infraorder: Araneomorphae
- Family: Gnaphosidae
- Genus: Gnaphosa
- Species: G. alacris

Binomial name
- Gnaphosa alacris Simon, 1878

Species of spider

Gnaphosa alacris is a ground spider species found in France, Italy, Croatia and Morocco. The spider hunts at night and hides during the day under rocks and leaves. Its body is oval, narrow and pointed at the rear.

The scientific name of the species was first published in 1878 by Eugène Simon.
