= Gnaphosa dolosa =

Scientific classification
- Kingdom: Animalia
- Phylum: Arthropoda
- Subphylum: Chelicerata
- Class: Arachnida
- Order: Araneae
- Infraorder: Araneomorphae
- Family: Gnaphosidae
- Genus: Gnaphosa
- Species: G. dolosa

Binomial name
- Gnaphosa dolosa Herman, 1879

Synonyms
- Gnaphosa luctifica Simon, 1914; Gnaphosa orchymonti Giltay, 1933

Species of spider

Gnaphosa dolosa is a ground spider species (family Gnaphosidae). It has a wide distribution in southern and eastern Europe, European Russia, and from Turkey to Central Asia.
