= Gnaphosa rufula =

Scientific classification
- Kingdom: Animalia
- Phylum: Arthropoda
- Subphylum: Chelicerata
- Class: Arachnida
- Order: Araneae
- Infraorder: Araneomorphae
- Family: Gnaphosidae
- Genus: Gnaphosa
- Species: G. rufula

Binomial name
- Gnaphosa rufula (L. Koch, 1866)

Species of spider

Gnaphosa rufula is a ground spider species found in Slovakia, Hungary, Bulgaria, Ukraine, European Russia, and Kazakhstan.
