= Gnaphosa taurica =

Scientific classification
- Kingdom: Animalia
- Phylum: Arthropoda
- Subphylum: Chelicerata
- Class: Arachnida
- Order: Araneae
- Infraorder: Araneomorphae
- Family: Gnaphosidae
- Genus: Gnaphosa
- Species: G. taurica

Binomial name
- Gnaphosa taurica Thorell, 1875

Species of spider

Gnaphosa taurica is a ground spider species found from "Bulgaria to China".
