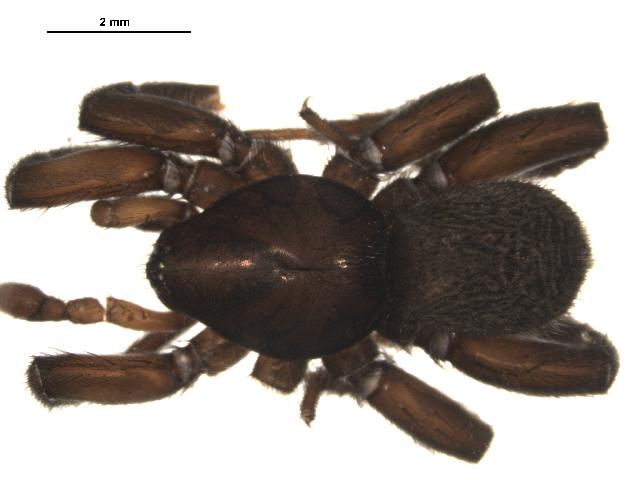

Scientific classification
- Kingdom: Animalia
- Phylum: Arthropoda
- Subphylum: Chelicerata
- Class: Arachnida
- Order: Araneae
- Infraorder: Araneomorphae
- Family: Gnaphosidae
- Genus: Gnaphosa
- Species: G. borea

Binomial name
- Gnaphosa borea Kulczynski, 1908

Synonyms
- Gnaphosa mima Chamberlin, 1933; Gnaphosa subparvula Fox, 1938

= Gnaphosa borea =

Species of spider

Gnaphosa borea is a ground spider species with Holarctic distribution. It is found in boreal forests in Russia (Tuva, South Siberia), in the United States (Toolik Lake, Alaska, Mount Katahdin, Baxter State Park, Maine) and in Canada (Alberta, Saskatchewan, Yukon).

This species appears to be dependent on some of the conditions associated with wildfires as it is absent or rarely collected in harvest-origin stands.
