= Gnaphosa cumensis =

Scientific classification
- Kingdom: Animalia
- Phylum: Arthropoda
- Subphylum: Chelicerata
- Class: Arachnida
- Order: Araneae
- Infraorder: Araneomorphae
- Family: Gnaphosidae
- Genus: Gnaphosa
- Species: G. cumensis

Binomial name
- Gnaphosa cumensis Ponomarev, 1981

Species of spider

Gnaphosa cumensis is a ground spider species found in Ukraine, Russia and Mongolia.
