= Gnaphosa balearicola =

Scientific classification
- Kingdom: Animalia
- Phylum: Arthropoda
- Subphylum: Chelicerata
- Class: Arachnida
- Order: Araneae
- Infraorder: Araneomorphae
- Family: Gnaphosidae
- Genus: Gnaphosa
- Species: G. balearicola

Binomial name
- Gnaphosa balearicola Strand, 1942

Species of spider

Gnaphosa balearicola is a ground spider species found in the Balearic Islands.
