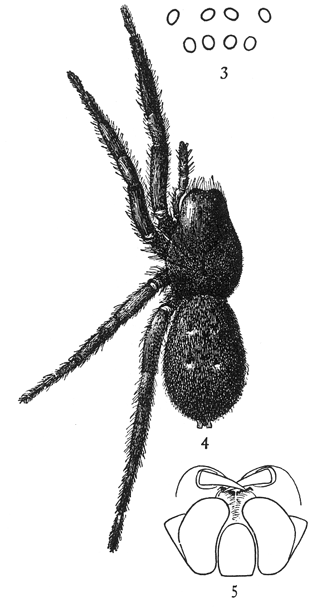

Scientific classification
- Kingdom: Animalia
- Phylum: Arthropoda
- Subphylum: Chelicerata
- Class: Arachnida
- Order: Araneae
- Infraorder: Araneomorphae
- Family: Gnaphosidae
- Genus: Gnaphosa
- Species: G. muscorum

Binomial name
- Gnaphosa muscorum (L. Koch, 1866)

Subspecies
- Gnaphosa muscorum gaunitzi Tullgren, 1955 — Sweden, Russia

= Gnaphosa muscorum =

Species of spider

Gnaphosa muscorum is a ground spider species with Holarctic distribution. The subspecies G. muscorum gaunitzi is found in Sweden and Russia.
