= Gnaphosa corticola =

Scientific classification
- Kingdom: Animalia
- Phylum: Arthropoda
- Subphylum: Chelicerata
- Class: Arachnida
- Order: Araneae
- Infraorder: Araneomorphae
- Family: Gnaphosidae
- Genus: Gnaphosa
- Species: G. corticola

Binomial name
- Gnaphosa corticola Simon, 1914

Species of spider

Gnaphosa corticola is a ground spider species found in France.
