= Gnaphosa mongolica =

Scientific classification
- Kingdom: Animalia
- Phylum: Arthropoda
- Subphylum: Chelicerata
- Class: Arachnida
- Order: Araneae
- Infraorder: Araneomorphae
- Family: Gnaphosidae
- Genus: Gnaphosa
- Species: G. mongolica

Binomial name
- Gnaphosa mongolica Simon, 1895

Species of spider

Gnaphosa mongolica is a ground spider species found from Turkey, Hungary to China.
