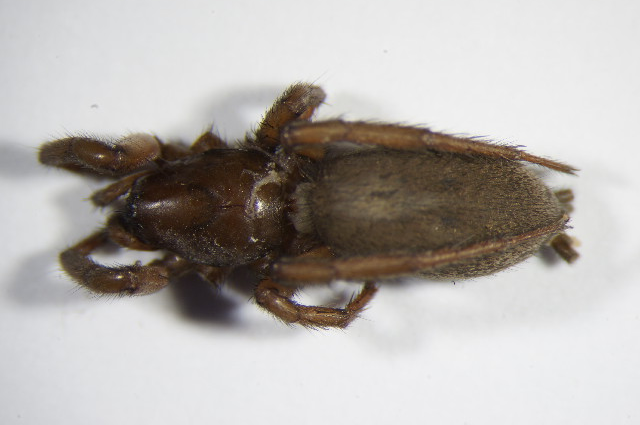

Scientific classification
- Kingdom: Animalia
- Phylum: Arthropoda
- Subphylum: Chelicerata
- Class: Arachnida
- Order: Araneae
- Infraorder: Araneomorphae
- Family: Gnaphosidae
- Genus: Gnaphosa
- Species: G. opaca

Binomial name
- Gnaphosa opaca Herman, 1879

= Gnaphosa opaca =

Species of spider

Gnaphosa opaca is a ground spider species found from Europe to Central Asia.
