= Gnaphosa ukrainica =

Scientific classification
- Kingdom: Animalia
- Phylum: Arthropoda
- Subphylum: Chelicerata
- Class: Arachnida
- Order: Araneae
- Infraorder: Araneomorphae
- Family: Gnaphosidae
- Genus: Gnaphosa
- Species: G. ukrainica

Binomial name
- Gnaphosa ukrainica Ovtsharenko, Platnick & Song, 1992

Synonyms
- Gnaphosa turkmenica Ovtsharenko, Platnick & Song, 1992

Species of spider

Gnaphosa ukrainica is a ground spider species found in Ukraine, Russia and Turkmenistan.
