= Gnaphosa stussineri =

Scientific classification
- Kingdom: Animalia
- Phylum: Arthropoda
- Subphylum: Chelicerata
- Class: Arachnida
- Order: Araneae
- Infraorder: Araneomorphae
- Family: Gnaphosidae
- Genus: Gnaphosa
- Species: G. stussineri

Binomial name
- Gnaphosa stussineri Simon, 1885

Species of spider

Gnaphosa stussineri is a ground spider species found in Greece.
