= Gnaphosa rhenana =

Scientific classification
- Kingdom: Animalia
- Phylum: Arthropoda
- Subphylum: Chelicerata
- Class: Arachnida
- Order: Araneae
- Infraorder: Araneomorphae
- Family: Gnaphosidae
- Genus: Gnaphosa
- Species: G. rhenana

Binomial name
- Gnaphosa rhenana Müller & Schenkel, 1895

Species of spider

Gnaphosa rhenana is a ground spider species found in Switzerland, Germany, Austria, Italy and Romania.
