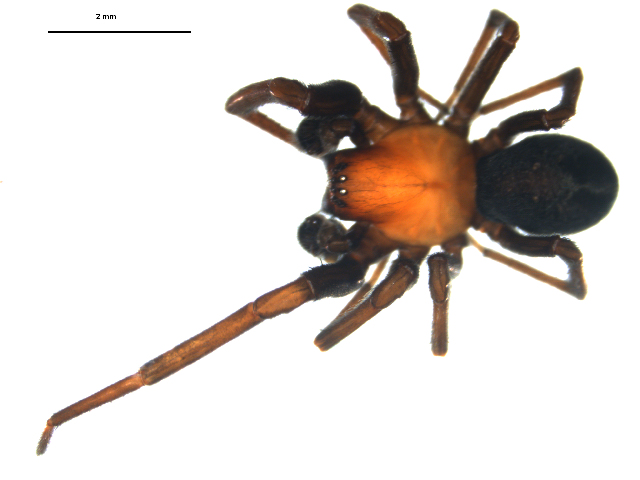
- T. nivalis, adult male
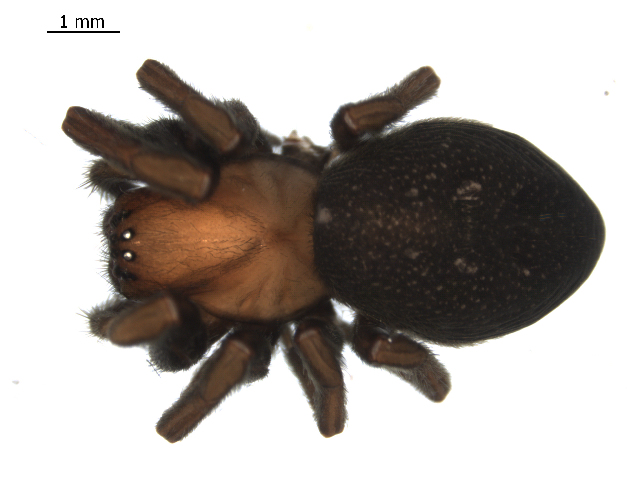
- T. nivalis, adult female

Scientific classification
- Kingdom: Animalia
- Phylum: Arthropoda
- Subphylum: Chelicerata
- Class: Arachnida
- Order: Araneae
- Infraorder: Araneomorphae
- Family: Titanoecidae
- Genus: Titanoeca
- Species: T. nivalis

Binomial name
- Titanoeca nivalis Simon, 1874

= Titanoeca nivalis =

Species of spider

Titanoeca nivalis is a species of araneomorph spider in the family Titanoecidae. It has a Holarctic distribution.
