= Gnaphosa fallax =

Scientific classification
- Kingdom: Animalia
- Phylum: Arthropoda
- Subphylum: Chelicerata
- Class: Arachnida
- Order: Araneae
- Infraorder: Araneomorphae
- Family: Gnaphosidae
- Genus: Gnaphosa
- Species: G. fallax

Binomial name
- Gnaphosa fallax Herman, 1879

Species of spider

Gnaphosa fallax is a ground spider species found in Hungary.
