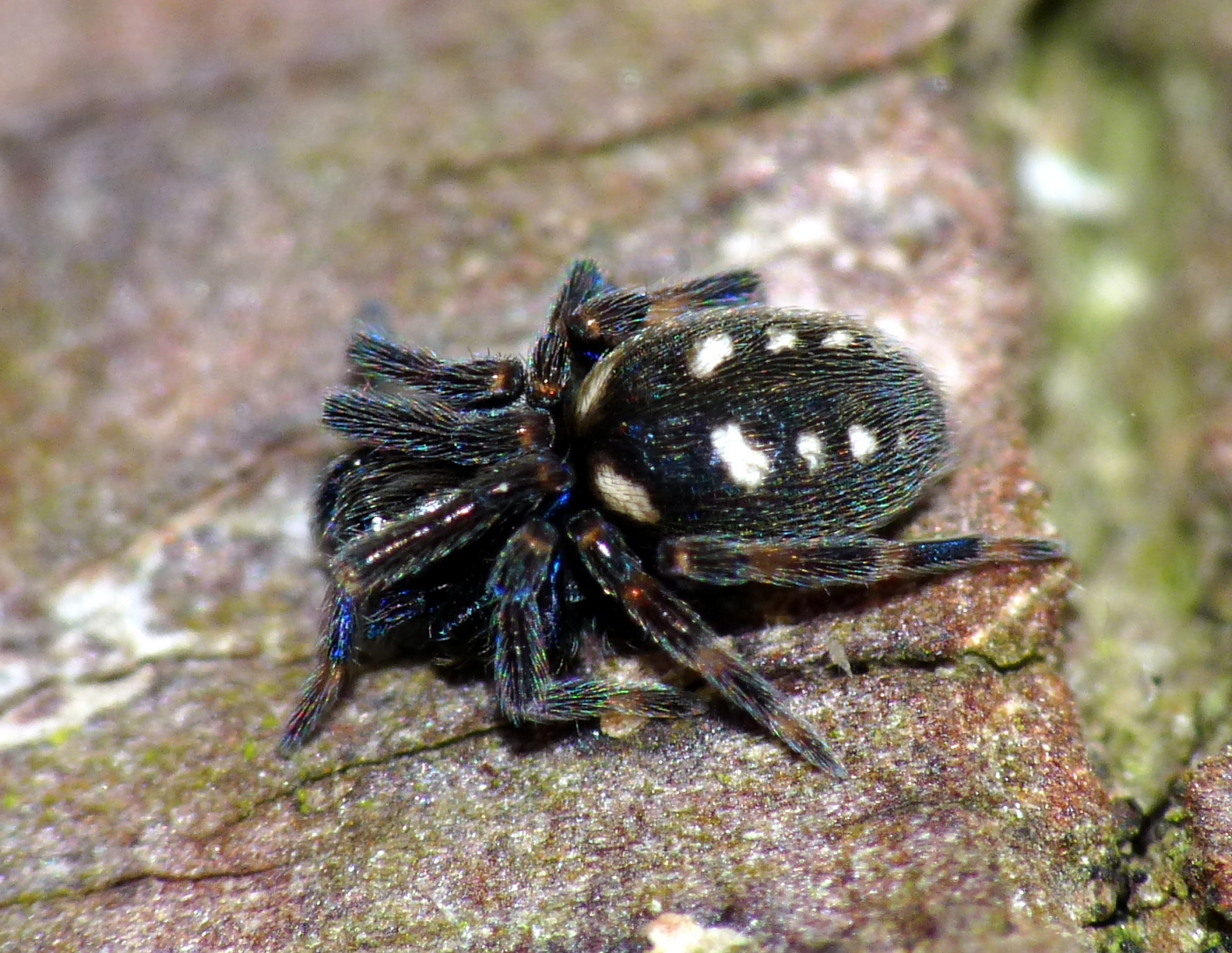
- Nurscia albomaculata (Titanoecidae)
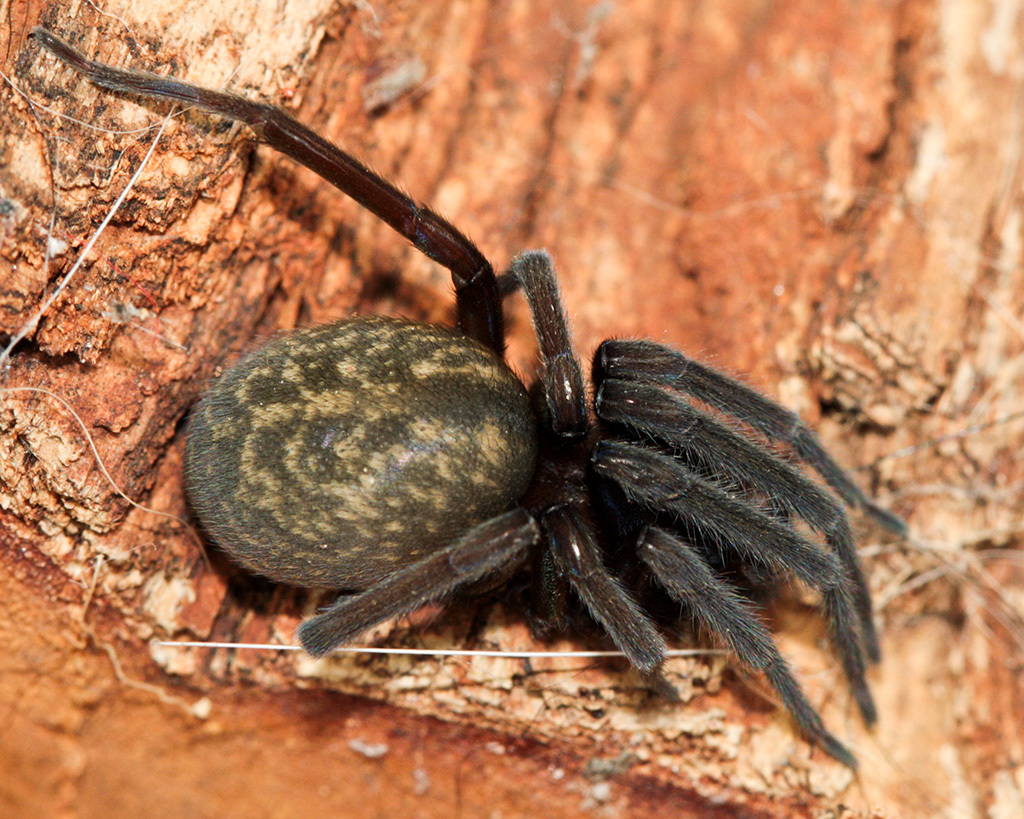
- Vidole capensis (Phyxelididae)

Scientific classification
- Kingdom: Animalia
- Phylum: Arthropoda
- Subphylum: Chelicerata
- Class: Arachnida
- Order: Araneae
- Infraorder: Araneomorphae
- Superfamily: Titanoecoidea

Families
- See text

= Titanoecoidea =

Superfamily of spiders

The Titanoecoidea or titanoecoids are a proposed taxon of araneomorph spiders at the superfamily rank. The taxon contains two families of spiders, Phyxelididae and Titanoecidae. Although some phylogenetic studies have shown these two families to form a clade, other studies have not, placing Titanoecidae outside the RTA clade while Phyxelididae is placed inside it. A 2011 classification of spider families leaves both Phyxelididae and Titanoecidae outside the RTA clade as "unplaced non-Orbiculariae families". The status of the group remains unclear as of December 2015.
