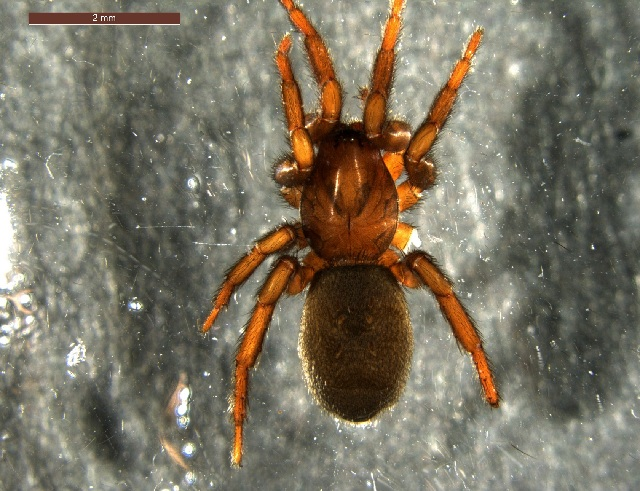

Scientific classification
- Kingdom: Animalia
- Phylum: Arthropoda
- Subphylum: Chelicerata
- Class: Arachnida
- Order: Araneae
- Infraorder: Araneomorphae
- Family: Gnaphosidae
- Genus: Gnaphosa
- Species: G. badia

Binomial name
- Gnaphosa badia (L. Koch, 1866)

= Gnaphosa badia =

Species of spider

Gnaphosa badia is a ground spider species found from Europe to Azerbaijan.
