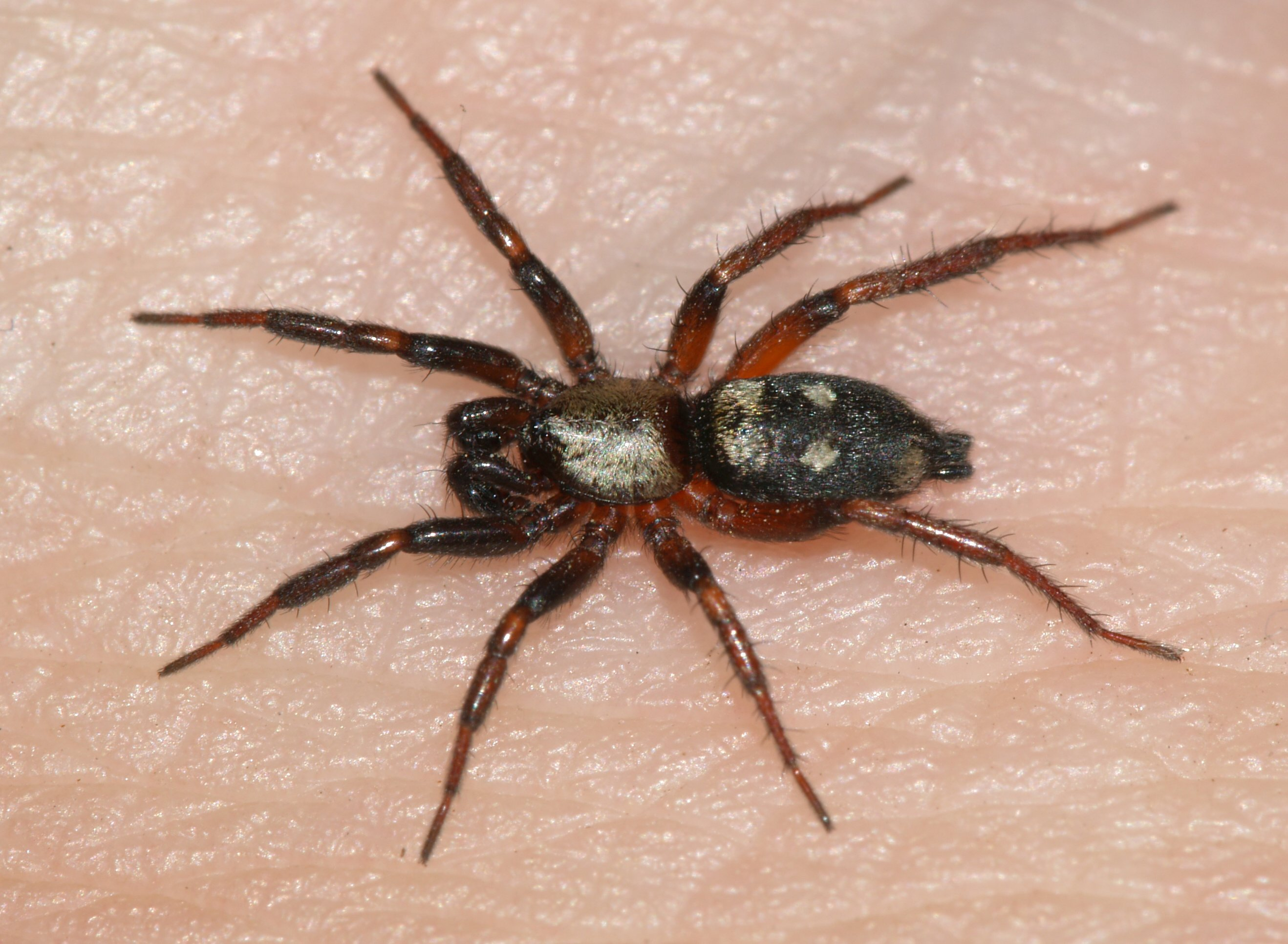
- male from Germany

Scientific classification
- Kingdom: Animalia
- Phylum: Arthropoda
- Subphylum: Chelicerata
- Class: Arachnida
- Order: Araneae
- Infraorder: Araneomorphae
- Family: Gnaphosidae
- Genus: Callilepis
- Species: C. schuszteri

Binomial name
- Callilepis schuszteri (Herman, 1879)

Synonyms
- Gnaphosa schuszteri Herman, 1879; Pythonissa flavitarsis Simon, 1880; Callilepis bipunctata Yaginuma, 1960

= Callilepis schuszteri =

Species of spider

Callilepis schuszteri is a species of spider in the family Gnaphosidae. It has a wide Holarctic distribution, being found across Europe, Turkey, the Caucasus, Russia (from the European regions to the Far East), China, Korea, and Japan.

== Taxonomy ==
The species was originally described as Gnaphosa schuszteri by Otto Herman in 1879 from specimens collected in Hungary. It was later transferred to the genus Callilepis by Chyzer & Kulczyński in 1897.

Two junior synonyms were established by Norman I. Platnick in 1975: Pythonissa flavitarsis Simon, 1880 and Callilepis bipunctata Yaginuma, 1960.

== Distribution ==
C. schuszteri has one of the widest distributions among Callilepis species, spanning the Palearctic realm from Western Europe to East Asia. It is found throughout Europe, extending into Turkey and the Caucasus region, and across Russia from the European territories to the Far East. The species also occurs in China, Korea, and Japan.

== Habitat ==
Based on Herman's original description, the species inhabits dry, rocky areas and appears to be adapted to arid environments. It runs fast.

== Description ==
Callilepis schuszteri is a medium-sized ground spider. According to the original description by Herman (1879), females have a body length of approximately 5.8 mm, while males are smaller at about 4.3 mm. The cephalothorax is relatively narrow with a distinctive pattern, and the abdomen shows characteristic coloration. The species exhibits typical gnaphosid features including robust legs adapted for ground-dwelling habits.

The female displays a predominantly dark coloration with yellowish markings, while the male is generally smaller and more slender with distinctive pedipalpal structures used for identification.
