= Plutus (disambiguation) =

Plutus is the Greek god of wealth. It may also refer to:

== Arts, entertainment, and media ==
- Plutus (opera), a three-act opéra comique by Charles Lecocq
- Plutus (play), an Ancient Greek comedy by the playwright Aristophanes

== Other uses ==
- Karl Plutus (1904–2010), Estonian jurist
- Chrysoritis plutus, a butterfly of the family Lycaenidae found only in South Africa
- Huanghai Plutus, a 2007–present Chinese mid-size pickup truck

== See also ==
- Pluteus (disambiguation)
