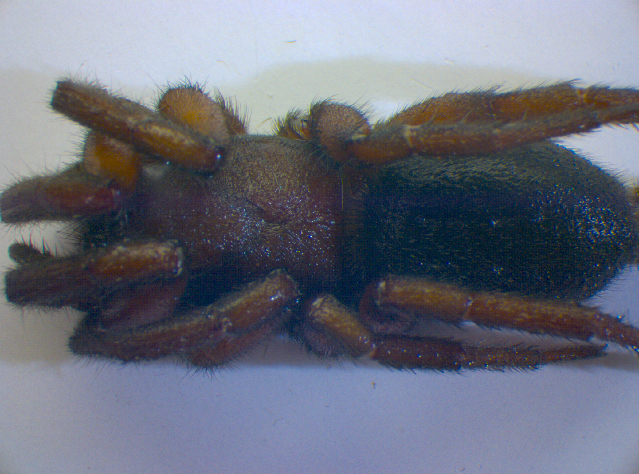

Scientific classification
- Kingdom: Animalia
- Phylum: Arthropoda
- Subphylum: Chelicerata
- Class: Arachnida
- Order: Araneae
- Infraorder: Araneomorphae
- Family: Gnaphosidae
- Genus: Gnaphosa
- Species: G. lucifuga

Binomial name
- Gnaphosa lucifuga (Walckenaer, 1802)

Subspecies
- Gnaphosa lucifuga minor Nosek, 1905 — Turkey

Synonyms
- Aranea lucifuga Walckenaer, 1802; Gnaphosa lucifuga — Thorell, 1868

= Gnaphosa lucifuga =

Species of spider

Gnaphosa lucifuga is a ground spider species with Palearctic distribution.

It is the type species of its genus. The type locality is situated in France. The holotype is located at Musée National d'Histoire Naturelle, Paris.
