= Titanoeca brunnea =

Scientific classification
- Domain: Eukaryota
- Kingdom: Animalia
- Phylum: Arthropoda
- Subphylum: Chelicerata
- Class: Arachnida
- Order: Araneae
- Infraorder: Araneomorphae
- Family: Titanoecidae
- Genus: Titanoeca
- Species: T. brunnea

Binomial name
- Titanoeca brunnea Emerton, 1888

Species of spider

Titanoeca brunnea is a species of true spider in the family Titanoecidae. It is found in the United States and Canada.
