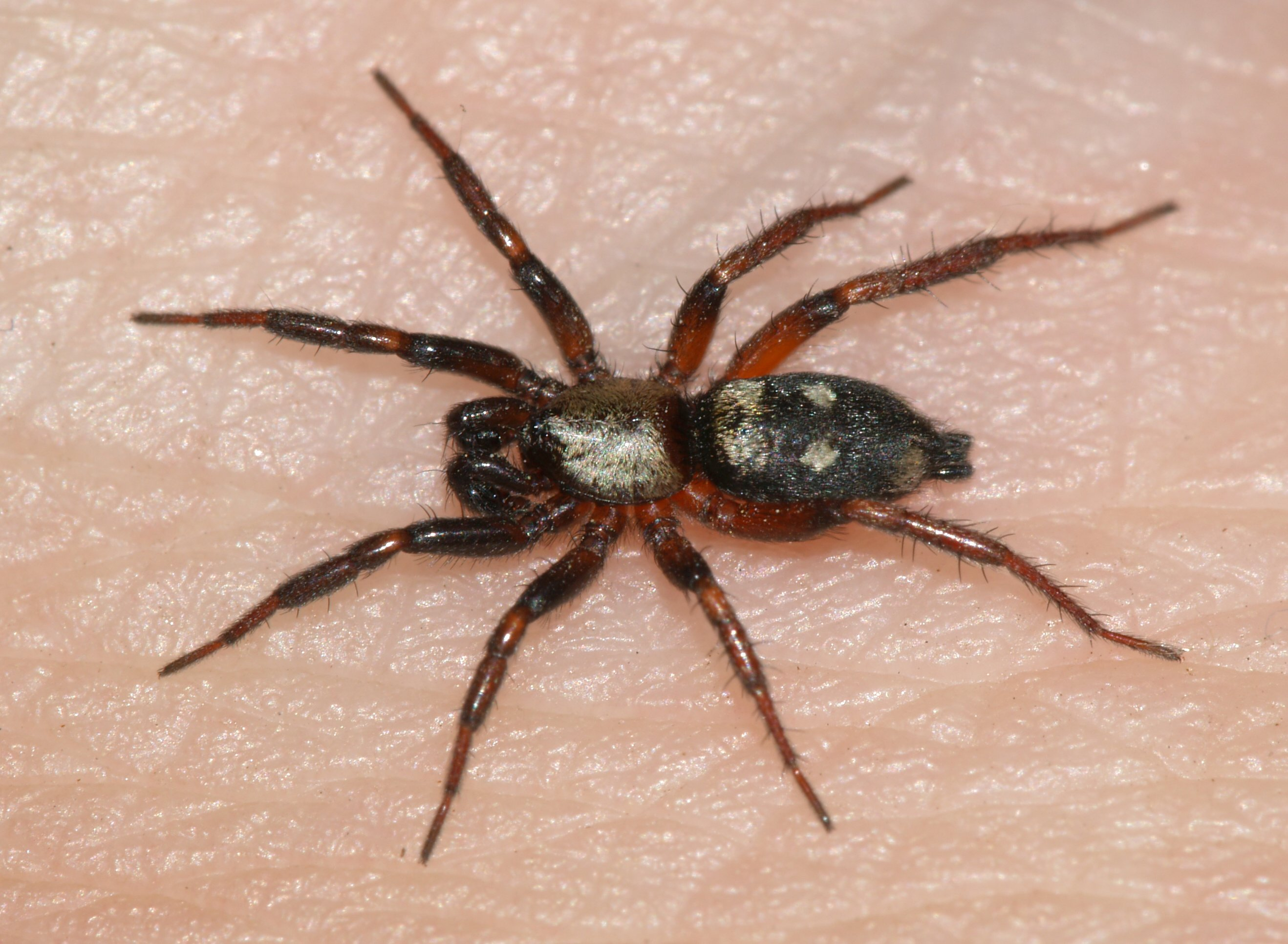
- male C. schuszteri

Scientific classification
- Domain: Eukaryota
- Kingdom: Animalia
- Phylum: Arthropoda
- Subphylum: Chelicerata
- Class: Arachnida
- Order: Araneae
- Infraorder: Araneomorphae
- Family: Gnaphosidae
- Genus: Callilepis; Westring, 1874

Type species
- C. nocturna (Linnaeus, 1758)

Species
- 18, see text

= Callilepis (spider) =

Genus of spiders

Callilepis is a genus of ground spiders first described by Niklas Westring in 1874. Some are found from Mexico to Canada, others from Europe to India. They are most commonly found in dry areas, sandy roads and beaches.

== Description ==
Individuals of this genus is easily distinguished from other Gnaphosidae by the single translucent lamina on the cheliceral retromargin, the short, angular endites and the flattened, transverse posterior median eyes. These eyes are probably not functional due to a series of ridges. Species range in size from 2.5 to 7 mm. The lateral eyes are larger than the medians. The abdomen is dark gray, longer than wide, with a dark, shiny anterior scutum in males, sometimes with white spots.

== Systematics ==
The species belong to two groups. The nocturna group consists of C. nocturna, C. pluto, C. imbecilla, C. chisos and C. concolor; the schuszteri group of C. schuszteri, C. mumai, C. eremella, C. gertschi and C. gosoga. Although both groups occur on both sides of the Atlantic, no species is holarctic in distribution.

== Species ==
As of April 2019 it contains eighteen species:

- Callilepis chakanensis Tikader, 1982 — India
- Callilepis chisos Platnick, 1975 — USA
- Callilepis concolor Simon, 1914 — Southern Europe
- Callilepis cretica (Roewer, 1928) — Macedonia, Greece, Turkey, Azerbaijan
- Callilepis eremella Chamberlin, 1928 — North America
- Callilepis gertschi Platnick, 1975 — USA, Mexico
- Callilepis gosoga Chamberlin & Gertsch, 1940 — USA
- Callilepis imbecilla (Keyserling, 1887) — USA, Canada
- Callilepis ketani Gajbe, 1984 — India
- Callilepis lambai Tikader & Gajbe, 1977 — India
- Callilepis mumai Platnick, 1975 — USA, Mexico
- Callilepis nocturna (Linnaeus, 1758) — Europe, Caucasus, Russia (Europe to Far East), Kazakhstan, China, Japan
- Callilepis pawani Gajbe, 1984 — India
- Callilepis pluto Banks, 1896 — USA, Canada
- Callilepis rajani Gajbe, 1984 — India
- Callilepis rajasthanica Tikader & Gajbe, 1977 — India
- Callilepis rukminiae Tikader & Gajbe, 1977 — India
- Callilepis schuszteri (Herman, 1879) — Europe, Caucasus, Russia (Europe to Far East), China, Korea, Japan
