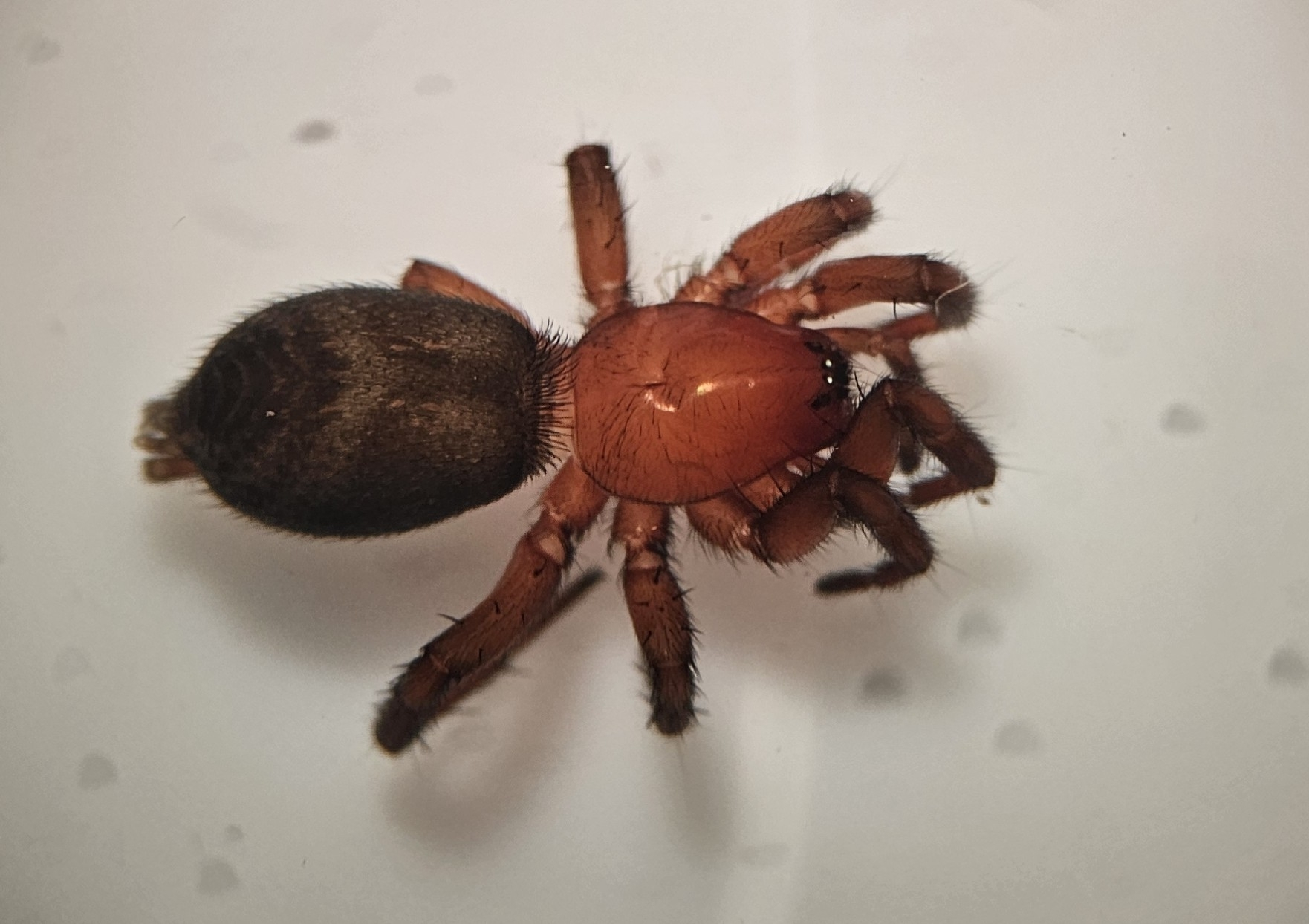

Scientific classification
- Kingdom: Animalia
- Phylum: Arthropoda
- Subphylum: Chelicerata
- Class: Arachnida
- Order: Araneae
- Infraorder: Araneomorphae
- Family: Gnaphosidae
- Genus: Gnaphosa
- Species: G. fontinalis

Binomial name
- Gnaphosa fontinalis Keyserling, 1887

Synonyms
- Gnaphosa americana Banks, 1896; Gnaphosa distincta Banks, 1898; Gnaphosa texana Chamberlin, 1922

= Gnaphosa fontinalis =

Species of spider

Gnaphosa fontinalis is a species of ground spider in the family Gnaphosidae. It is found in the United States and Mexico.
