= Gnaphosa jucunda =

Scientific classification
- Kingdom: Animalia
- Phylum: Arthropoda
- Subphylum: Chelicerata
- Class: Arachnida
- Order: Araneae
- Infraorder: Araneomorphae
- Family: Gnaphosidae
- Genus: Gnaphosa
- Species: G. jucunda

Binomial name
- Gnaphosa jucunda Thorell, 1875

Species of spider

Gnaphosa jucunda is a ground spider species found in Russia and Ukraine.
