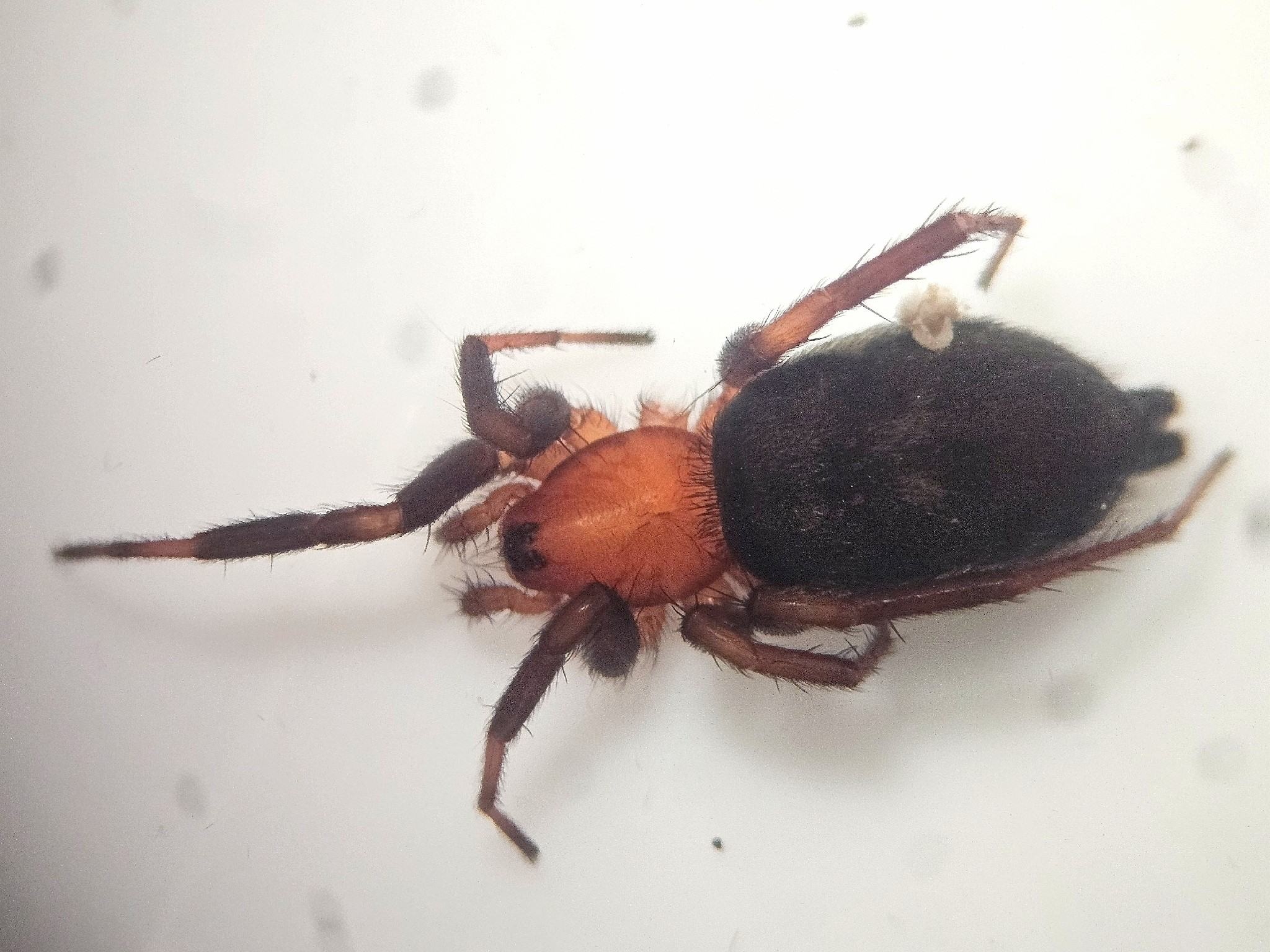

Scientific classification
- Kingdom: Animalia
- Phylum: Arthropoda
- Subphylum: Chelicerata
- Class: Arachnida
- Order: Araneae
- Infraorder: Araneomorphae
- Family: Gnaphosidae
- Genus: Callilepis
- Species: C. imbecilla

Binomial name
- Callilepis imbecilla (Keyserling, 1887)

Synonyms
- Callilepis munda Chamberlin, 1936; Pythonissa imbecilla Keyserling, 1887

= Callilepis imbecilla =

Species of spider

Callilepis imbecilla is a species of ground spider in the family Gnaphosidae. It is found in the United States and Canada.
