= Gnaphosa petrobia =

Scientific classification
- Kingdom: Animalia
- Phylum: Arthropoda
- Subphylum: Chelicerata
- Class: Arachnida
- Order: Araneae
- Infraorder: Araneomorphae
- Family: Gnaphosidae
- Genus: Gnaphosa
- Species: G. petrobia

Binomial name
- Gnaphosa petrobia L. Koch, 1872

Species of spider

Gnaphosa petrobia is a ground spider species found in Europe.
