= Gnaphosa nordlandica =

Scientific classification
- Kingdom: Animalia
- Phylum: Arthropoda
- Subphylum: Chelicerata
- Class: Arachnida
- Order: Araneae
- Infraorder: Araneomorphae
- Family: Gnaphosidae
- Genus: Gnaphosa
- Species: G. nordlandica

Binomial name
- Gnaphosa nordlandica Strand, 1900
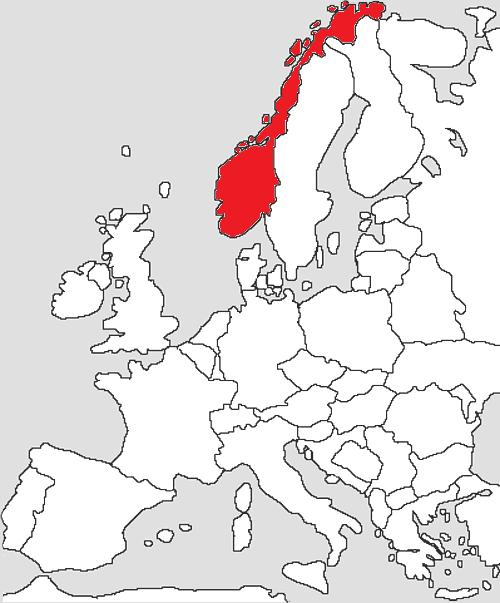
- Distribution of Gnaphosa nordlandica.

Species of spider

Gnaphosa nordlandica is a ground spider species found in Norway.
