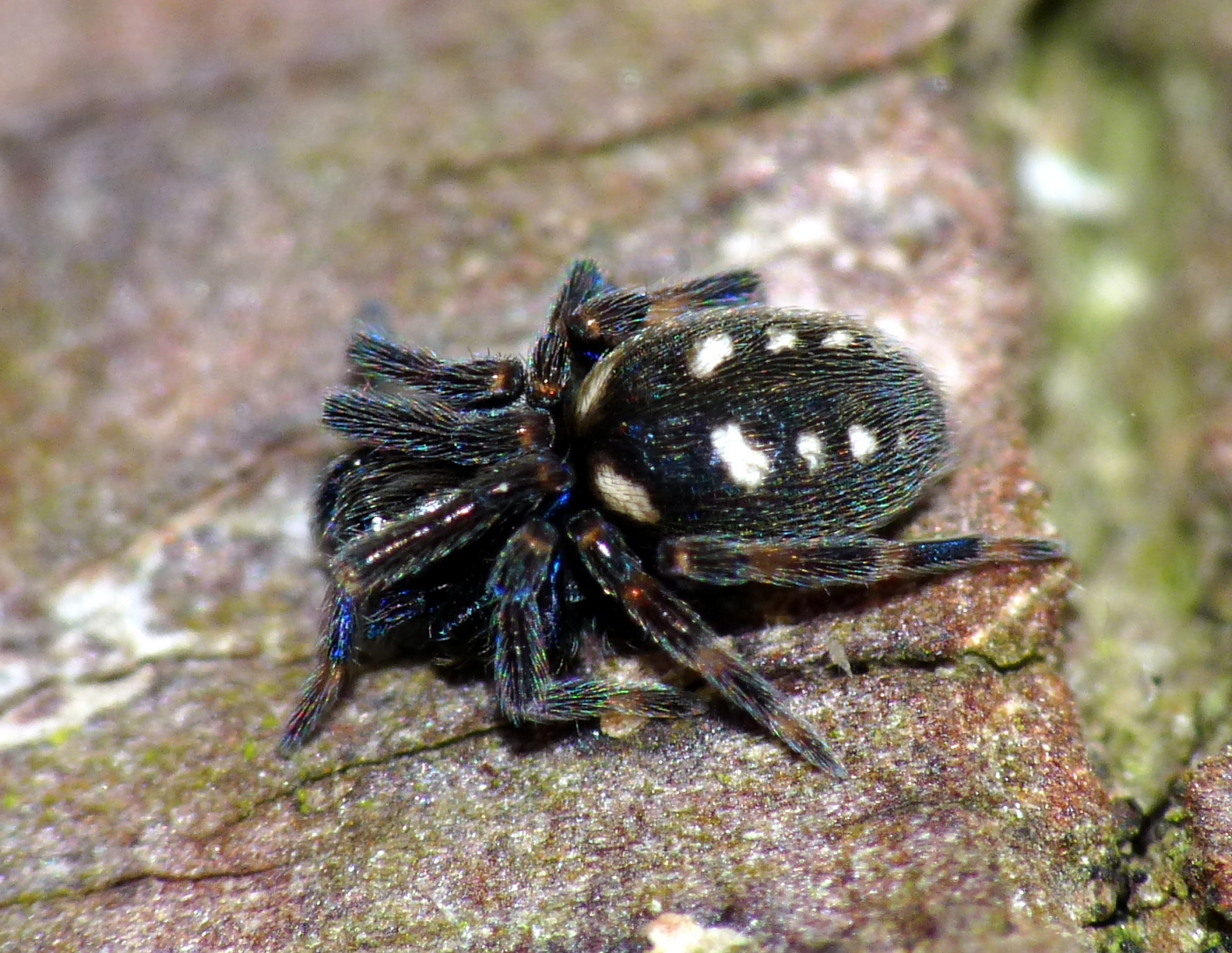
- Nurscia albomaculata

Scientific classification
- Kingdom: Animalia
- Phylum: Arthropoda
- Subphylum: Chelicerata
- Class: Arachnida
- Order: Araneae
- Infraorder: Araneomorphae
- Family: Titanoecidae
- Genus: Nurscia; Simon, 1874

Species
- Nurscia albofasciata Nurscia albomaculata Nurscia albosignata Nurscia sequerai

Diversity
- 4 species

= Nurscia =

Genus of spiders

Nurscia is a genus of spiders in the family Titanoecidae. It is a relatively widespread genus with species being found in both Europe and Asia.

== Species ==
- Nurscia albofasciata (Strand, 1907) — Russia, China, Korea, Taiwan, Japan
- Nurscia albomaculata (Lucas, 1846) — Europe to Central Asia
- Nurscia albosignata Simon, 1874 — Bulgaria, Cyprus to Central Asia
- Nurscia sequerai (Simon, 1892) — Portugal to France
