= Titanoeca tristis =

Scientific classification
- Domain: Eukaryota
- Kingdom: Animalia
- Phylum: Arthropoda
- Subphylum: Chelicerata
- Class: Arachnida
- Order: Araneae
- Infraorder: Araneomorphae
- Family: Titanoecidae
- Genus: Titanoeca
- Species: T. tristis

Binomial name
- Titanoeca tristis L. Koch, 1872

Species of spider

Titanoeca tristis is a species of araneomorph spider in the family Titanoecidae. It is found from Europe to Central Asia.
