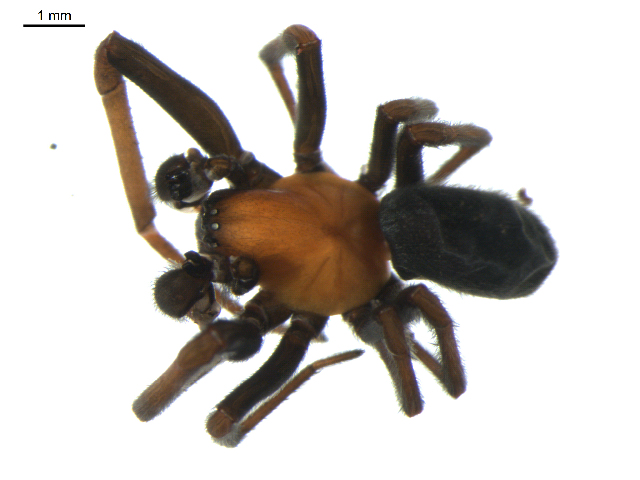

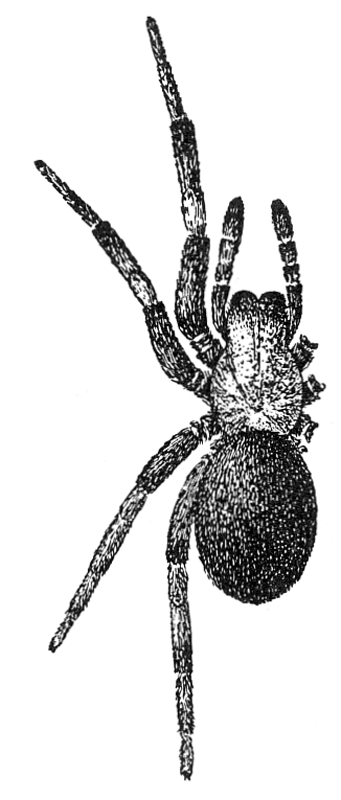
- drawing

Scientific classification
- Domain: Eukaryota
- Kingdom: Animalia
- Phylum: Arthropoda
- Subphylum: Chelicerata
- Class: Arachnida
- Order: Araneae
- Infraorder: Araneomorphae
- Family: Titanoecidae
- Genus: Titanoeca
- Species: T. americana

Binomial name
- Titanoeca americana Emerton, 1888

= Titanoeca americana =

Species of spider

Titanoeca americana is a species of true spider in the family Titanoecidae. It is found in North America.
