= Gnaphosa moesta =

Scientific classification
- Kingdom: Animalia
- Phylum: Arthropoda
- Subphylum: Chelicerata
- Class: Arachnida
- Order: Araneae
- Infraorder: Araneomorphae
- Family: Gnaphosidae
- Genus: Gnaphosa
- Species: G. moesta

Binomial name
- Gnaphosa moesta Thorell, 1875

Species of spider

Gnaphosa moesta is a ground spider species found in Hungary, Romania, Ukraine and Russia.
