= Titanoeca spominima =

Scientific classification
- Kingdom: Animalia
- Phylum: Arthropoda
- Subphylum: Chelicerata
- Class: Arachnida
- Order: Araneae
- Infraorder: Araneomorphae
- Family: Titanoecidae
- Genus: Titanoeca
- Species: T. spominima

Binomial name
- Titanoeca spominima (Taczanowski, 1866)

Species of spider

Titanoeca spominima is a spider species found in Europe.
