= Gnaphosa bithynica =

Scientific classification
- Kingdom: Animalia
- Phylum: Arthropoda
- Subphylum: Chelicerata
- Class: Arachnida
- Order: Araneae
- Infraorder: Araneomorphae
- Family: Gnaphosidae
- Genus: Gnaphosa
- Species: G. bithynica

Binomial name
- Gnaphosa bithynica Kulczynski, 1903

Species of spider

Gnaphosa bithynica is a ground spider species found in Crete and Turkey.
