= Gnaphosa lapponum =

Scientific classification
- Kingdom: Animalia
- Phylum: Arthropoda
- Subphylum: Chelicerata
- Class: Arachnida
- Order: Araneae
- Infraorder: Araneomorphae
- Family: Gnaphosidae
- Genus: Gnaphosa
- Species: G. lapponum

Binomial name
- Gnaphosa lapponum (L. Koch, 1866)

Species of spider

Gnaphosa lapponum is a ground spider species found across heaths and heath-like terrain in alpine-subalpine zones of Europe (including Iceland) and Russia (European Russia to West Siberia).

== Appearance ==
Specimens have a brown prosoma and opisthosoma, with females larger than males, with respective body lengths of 8-10 mm for female specimens, and 7.5-8.3 mm for males.

== Former subspecies ==
Gnaphosa lapponum inermis was formerly considered a subspecies of Gnaphosa lapponum, but was fully synonymized with the nominate form of the species in 2019.
