= Pluton (disambiguation) =

A pluton is a body of intrusive igneous rock.

Pluton may also refer to:

- A proposed IAU definition of planet rejected in favour of plutoid
- French ship Pluton, eight naval ships
- Spanish destroyer Plutón, 1897
- Pluton (missile), a French missile
- A village in Pipirig Commune, Neamţ County, Romania
- Pluton (complex), space radar, Crimea, 1960
- Pluton or Plouton, Greek for Pluto (mythology), also Plutón in Spanish or Pluton in French
- Microsoft Pluton security processor

== See also ==
- Plutino
- Pluto (disambiguation)
- Plutonism
