= Gnaphosa mcheidzeae =

Scientific classification
- Kingdom: Animalia
- Phylum: Arthropoda
- Subphylum: Chelicerata
- Class: Arachnida
- Order: Araneae
- Infraorder: Araneomorphae
- Family: Gnaphosidae
- Genus: Gnaphosa
- Species: G. mcheidzeae

Binomial name
- Gnaphosa mcheidzeae Mikhailov, 1998

Species of spider

Gnaphosa mcheidzeae is a species of ground spiders found in Georgia.
