= Callilepis gosoga =

Scientific classification
- Kingdom: Animalia
- Phylum: Arthropoda
- Subphylum: Chelicerata
- Class: Arachnida
- Order: Araneae
- Infraorder: Araneomorphae
- Family: Gnaphosidae
- Genus: Callilepis
- Species: C. gosoga

Binomial name
- Callilepis gosoga Chamberlin & Gertsch, 1940

Species of spider

Callilepis gosoga is a species of ground spider in the family Gnaphosidae. It is found in the United States.
