= Gnaphosa lonai =

Scientific classification
- Kingdom: Animalia
- Phylum: Arthropoda
- Subphylum: Chelicerata
- Class: Arachnida
- Order: Araneae
- Infraorder: Araneomorphae
- Family: Gnaphosidae
- Genus: Gnaphosa
- Species: G. lonai

Binomial name
- Gnaphosa lonai Caporiacco, 1949

Species of spider

Gnaphosa lonai is a ground spider species found in Italy.
