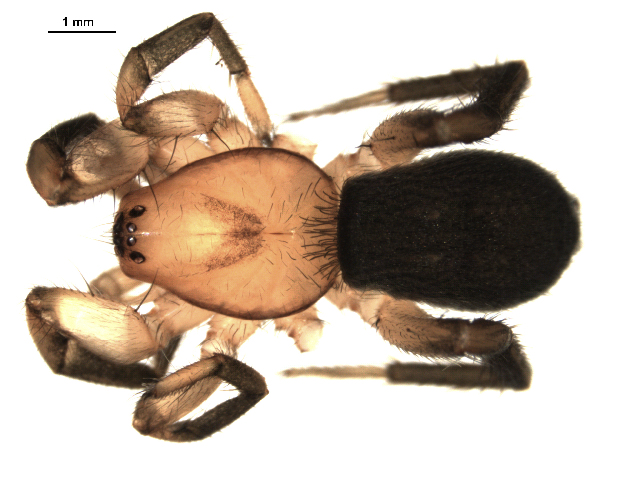

Scientific classification
- Domain: Eukaryota
- Kingdom: Animalia
- Phylum: Arthropoda
- Subphylum: Chelicerata
- Class: Arachnida
- Order: Araneae
- Infraorder: Araneomorphae
- Family: Gnaphosidae
- Genus: Gnaphosa
- Species: G. sericata

Binomial name
- Gnaphosa sericata (L. Koch, 1866)

Synonyms
- Gnaphosa peon L. Koch, 1866; Gnaphosa simplex F. O. P.-Cambridge, 1899; Gnaphosa spiralis Chamberlin, 1925; Poecilochroa inconspicua Franganillo, 1926; Pythonissa sericata Bryant, 1948

= Gnaphosa sericata =

Species of spider

Gnaphosa sericata is a species of ground spider in the family Gnaphosidae. It is found in a range from the United States to Guatemala and Cuba.
