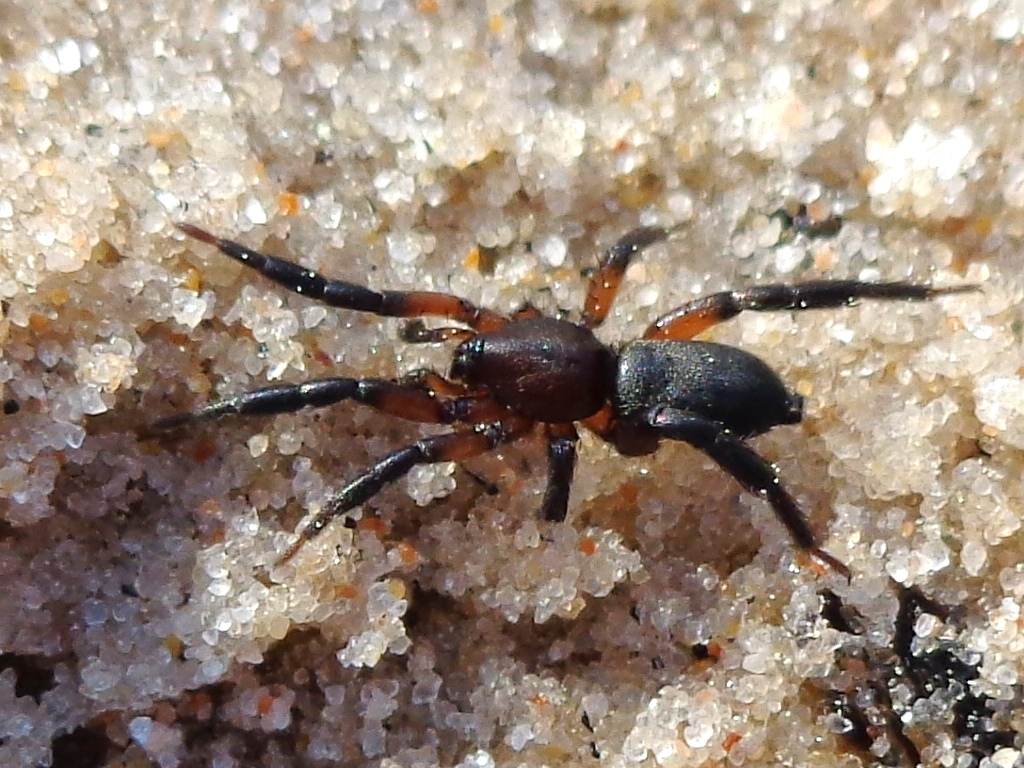

Scientific classification
- Kingdom: Animalia
- Phylum: Arthropoda
- Subphylum: Chelicerata
- Class: Arachnida
- Order: Araneae
- Infraorder: Araneomorphae
- Family: Gnaphosidae
- Genus: Gnaphosa
- Species: G. bicolor

Binomial name
- Gnaphosa bicolor (Hahn, 1833)

= Gnaphosa bicolor =

Species of spider

Gnaphosa bicolor is a ground spider species found in Europe to Ukraine and Georgia.
