= Gnaphosa parvula =

Scientific classification
- Domain: Eukaryota
- Kingdom: Animalia
- Phylum: Arthropoda
- Subphylum: Chelicerata
- Class: Arachnida
- Order: Araneae
- Infraorder: Araneomorphae
- Family: Gnaphosidae
- Genus: Gnaphosa
- Species: G. parvula

Binomial name
- Gnaphosa parvula Banks, 1896

Species of spider

Gnaphosa parvula is a species of ground spider in the family Gnaphosidae. It is found in the United States and Canada.
