= Anuvinda =

Scientific classification
- Domain: Eukaryota
- Kingdom: Animalia
- Phylum: Arthropoda
- Subphylum: Chelicerata
- Class: Arachnida
- Order: Araneae
- Infraorder: Araneomorphae
- Family: Titanoecidae
- Genus: Anuvinda; Lehtinen

Type species
- Anuvinda escheri

Species
- Anuvinda escheri (Reimoser, 1934); Anuvinda milloti (Hubert, 1973)

Genus of spiders

Anuvinda is a genus of spiders in the family Titanoecidae. It was first described in 1967 by Pekka T. Lehtinen. As of 2024, it contains two Asian species.
