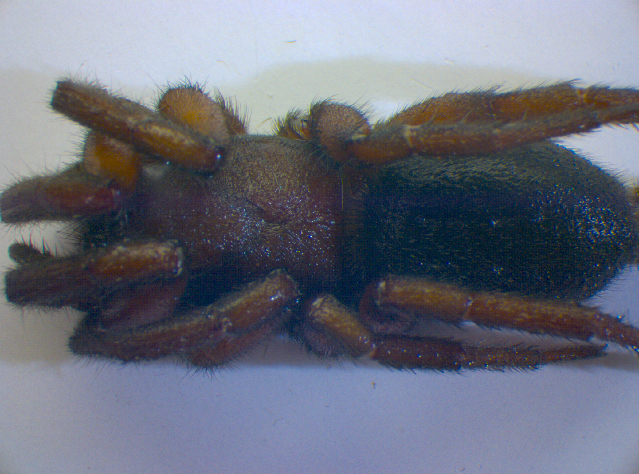
- Gnaphosa lucifuga

Scientific classification
- Kingdom: Animalia
- Phylum: Arthropoda
- Subphylum: Chelicerata
- Class: Arachnida
- Order: Araneae
- Infraorder: Araneomorphae
- Family: Gnaphosidae
- Genus: Gnaphosa; Latreille, 1804

Type species
- G. lucifuga (Walckenaer, 1802)

Species
- 148, see text

Synonyms
- Cylphosa Chamberlin, 1939; Pterochroa Benoit, 1977

= Gnaphosa =

Gnaphosa Temporal range: Cretaceous–present

Genus of spiders

Gnaphosa is a genus of ground spiders that was first described by Pierre André Latreille in 1804. They all have a serrated keel on the retromargin of each chelicera.

== Species ==
As of May 2019 it contains 148 species:

- G. aborigena Tyschchenko, 1965 – Kazakhstan
- G. akagiensis Hayashi, 1994 – Japan
- G. alacris Simon, 1878 – France, Italy, Croatia, Morocco
- G. alpica Simon, 1878 – France, Switzerland, Austria
- G. altudona Chamberlin, 1922 – USA
- G. antipola Chamberlin, 1933 – USA, Canada
- G. artaensis Wunderlich, 2011 – Portugal, Spain (Balearic Is.)
- G. atramentaria Simon, 1878 – France
- G. azerbaidzhanica Tuneva & Esyunin, 2003 – Azerbaijan
- G. badia (L. Koch, 1866) – Europe to Azerbaijan
- G. balearicola Strand, 1942 – Spain (Balearic Is.)
- G. banini Marusik & Koponen, 2001 – Russia (South Siberia), Mongolia
- G. basilicata Simon, 1882 – Italy
- G. belyaevi Ovtsharenko, Platnick & Song, 1992 – Mongolia
- G. betpaki Ovtsharenko, Platnick & Song, 1992 – Russia (Urals), Kazakhstan
- G. bicolor (Hahn, 1833) – Europe, Turkey, Caucasus, Russia (Europe to West Siberia)
- G. bithynica Kulczyński, 1903 – Greece (Crete), Turkey, Lebanon, Israel, Jordan, Iran
- G. borea Kulczyński, 1908 – Russia (Middle Siberia to Far East), North America
- G. brumalis Thorell, 1875 – USA, Canada
- G. californica Banks, 1904 – USA, Canada
- G. campanulata Zhang & Song, 2001 – China
- G. cantabrica Simon, 1914 – Spain, France
- G. caucasica Ovtsharenko, Platnick & Song, 1992 – Russia (Caucasus)
- G. chiapas Platnick & Shadab, 1975 – Mexico
- G. chihuahua Platnick & Shadab, 1975 – Mexico
- G. chola Ovtsharenko & Marusik, 1988 – Russia (Middle Siberia to Far East), Mongolia, China
- G. clara (Keyserling, 1887) – North America
- G. corticola Simon, 1914 – France
- G. cumensis Ponomarev, 1981 – Ukraine, Russia (Europe), Kazakhstan, Mongolia
- G. cyrenaica (Caporiacco, 1949) – Libya
- G. danieli Miller & Buchar, 1972 – Afghanistan
- G. dege Ovtsharenko, Platnick & Song, 1992 – Kyrgyzstan, Pakistan, India, China
- G. dentata Platnick & Shadab, 1975 – USA
- G. deserta Ponomarev & Dvadnenko, 2011 – Russia (Europe)
- G. dolanskyi Řezáč, Růžička, Oger & Řezáčová, 2018 – South-eastern Europe, Ukraine, Russia (Europe), Turkey, Caucasus
- G. dolosa Herman, 1879 – Southern to Eastern Europe, Turkey, Syria, Iraq, Iran, Caucasus, Russia (Europe) to Central Asia
- G. donensis Ponomarev, 2015 – Russia (Europe)
- G. eskovi Ovtsharenko, Platnick & Song, 1992 – Kazakhstan
- G. esyunini Marusik, Fomichev & Omelko, 2014 – Mongolia
- G. eucalyptus Ghafoor & Beg, 2002 – Pakistan
- G. fagei Schenkel, 1963 – Kazakhstan, China
- G. fallax Herman, 1879 – Hungary
- G. fontinalis Keyserling, 1887 – USA, Mexico
- G. funerea (Dalmas, 1921) – St. Helena
- G. gracilior Kulczyński, 1901 – Russia (Middle and South Siberia to Far East), Mongolia, China
- G. haarlovi Denis, 1958 – Central Asia
- G. halophila Esyunin & Efimik, 1997 – Russia (Urals)
- G. hastata Fox, 1937 – China, Korea
- G. hirsutipes Banks, 1901 – USA, Mexico
- G. iberica Simon, 1878 – Spain
- G. ilika Ovtsharenko, Platnick & Song, 1992 – Kazakhstan, Kyrgyzstan, Uzbekistan
- G. inconspecta Simon, 1878 – Western and Central Europe, Italy, Russia (Middle Siberia to Far East), Mongolia, China, Korea
- G. jodhpurensis Tikader & Gajbe, 1977 – India, China
- G. jucunda Thorell, 1875 – Ukraine, Russia (Europe, Caucasus)
- G. kailana Tikader, 1966 – India
- G. kamurai Ovtsharenko, Platnick & Song, 1992 – Korea, Japan
- G. kankhalae Biswas & Roy, 2008 – India
- G. kansuensis Schenkel, 1936 – Russia (Far East), China, Korea
- G. ketmer Tuneva, 2004 – Kazakhstan
- G. khovdensis Marusik, Fomichev & Omelko, 2014 – Mongolia
- G. kompirensis Bösenberg & Strand, 1906 – Russia (Far East), China, Korea, Taiwan, Japan, Vietnam
- G. koponeni Marusik & Omelko, 2014 – Russia (South Siberia)
- G. kuldzha Ovtsharenko, Platnick & Song, 1992 – Turkmenistan, Kyrgyzstan
- G. kurchak Ovtsharenko, Platnick & Song, 1992 – Kyrgyzstan
- G. lapponum (L. Koch, 1866) – Europe, Russia (Europe to West Siberia)
  - Gnaphosa l. inermis Strand, 1899 – Norway
- G. leporina (L. Koch, 1866) – Europe, Turkey, Caucasus, Russia (Europe to South Siberia), Central Asia, China
- G. licenti Schenkel, 1953 – Russia (Europe to South Siberia), Kazakhstan, Kyrgyzstan, Mongolia, China, Korea
- G. limbata Strand, 1900 – Norway
- G. lonai Caporiacco, 1949 – Italy
- G. lucifuga (Walckenaer, 1802) (type) – Europe, Turkey, Caucasus, Iran, Russia (Europe to South Siberia), Kazakhstan, China
  - Gnaphosa l. minor Nosek, 1905 – Turkey
- G. lugubris (C. L. Koch, 1839) – Europe to Central Asia
- G. mandschurica Schenkel, 1963 – Russia (Middle and South Siberia), Kazakhstan, Mongolia, China, Nepal
- G. maritima Platnick & Shadab, 1975 – USA, Mexico
- G. mcheidzeae Mikhailov, 1998 – Georgia
- G. microps Holm, 1939 – North America, Europe, Turkey, Russia (Europe to Far East)
- G. modestior Kulczyński, 1897 – Italy, Austria, Czechia to Romania
- G. moerens O. Pickard-Cambridge, 1885 – China, Nepal
- G. moesta Thorell, 1875 – Hungary, Romania, Ukraine, Russia (Europe)?
- G. mongolica Simon, 1895 – Turkey, Hungary to China
- G. montana (L. Koch, 1866) – Europe, Turkey, Russia (Europe to South Siberia), Kazakhstan
- G. muscorum (L. Koch, 1866) – North America, Europe, Caucasus, Russia (Europe to Far East), Kazakhstan, China, Korea
  - Gnaphosa m. gaunitzi Tullgren, 1955 – Sweden, Russia (South Siberia)
- G. namulinensis Hu, 2001 – China
- G. nigerrima L. Koch, 1877 – Europe, Russia (Europe to Far East)
- G. nordlandica Strand, 1900 – Norway
- G. norvegica Strand, 1900 – Norway
- G. occidentalis Simon, 1878 – Western Europe
- G. oceanica Simon, 1878 – France
- G. ogeri Lecigne, 2018 – France
- G. oligerae Ovtsharenko & Platnick, 1998 – Russia (Far East)
- G. opaca Herman, 1879 – Europe to Central Asia
- G. orites Chamberlin, 1922 – North America, Northern Europe, Caucasus, Russia (Europe to Far East)
- G. ovchinnikovi Ovtsharenko, Platnick & Song, 1992 – Kyrgyzstan
- G. pakistanica Ovtchinnikov, Ahmad & Inayatullah, 2008 – Pakistan
- G. parvula Banks, 1896 – USA, Canada
- G. pauriensis Tikader & Gajbe, 1977 – India
- G. pengi Zhang & Yin, 2001 – China
- G. perplexa Denis, 1958 – Afghanistan
- G. petrobia L. Koch, 1872 – Europe, Iran
- G. pilosa Savelyeva, 1972 – Kazakhstan
- G. poonaensis Tikader, 1973 – India
- G. porrecta Strand, 1900 – Norway
- G. potanini Simon, 1895 – Russia (South Siberia, Far East), Mongolia, China, Korea, Japan
- G. potosi Platnick & Shadab, 1975 – Mexico
- G. primorica Ovtsharenko, Platnick & Song, 1992 – Russia (Far East), Japan
- G. prosperi Simon, 1878 – Spain
- G. pseashcho Ovtsharenko, Platnick & Song, 1992 – Russia (Caucasus)
- G. pseudoleporina Ovtsharenko, Platnick & Song, 1992 – Russia (South Siberia)
- G. rasnitsyni Marusik, 1993 – Mongolia
- G. reikhardi Ovtsharenko, Platnick & Song, 1992 – Kazakhstan, Kyrgyzstan
- G. rhenana Müller & Schenkel, 1895 – France, Switzerland, Germany, Austria, Italy, Romania, Albania
- G. rohtakensis Gajbe, 1992 – India
- G. rufula (L. Koch, 1866) – Bulgaria, Slovakia, Hungary, Ukraine, Russia (Europe), Kazakhstan
- G. salsa Platnick & Shadab, 1975 – USA, Mexico
- G. sandersi Gertsch & Davis, 1940 – Mexico
- G. saurica Ovtsharenko, Platnick & Song, 1992 – Ukraine, Caucasus, Iran, Russia (Europe) to Central Asia
- G. saxosa Platnick & Shadab, 1975 – USA
- G. secreta Simon, 1878 – France
- G. sericata (L. Koch, 1866) – USA to Guatemala, Cuba
- G. serzonshteini Fomichev & Marusik, 2017 – Mongolia
- G. similis Kulczyński, 1926 – Russia (Middle and South Siberia to Far East), China, Korea
- G. sinensis Simon, 1880 – China, Korea
- G. snohomish Platnick & Shadab, 1975 – USA, Canada
- G. songi Zhang, 2001 – China
- G. sonora Platnick & Shadab, 1975 – Mexico
- G. steppica Ovtsharenko, Platnick & Song, 1992 – Turkey, Caucasus, Ukraine, Russia (Europe to South Siberia), Kazakhstan
- G. sticta Kulczyński, 1908 – Scandinavia, Russia (Europe to Far East), Japan
- G. stoliczkai O. Pickard-Cambridge, 1885 – Mongolia, China
- G. stussineri Simon, 1885 – Greece
- G. synthetica Chamberlin, 1924 – USA, Mexico
- G. tarabaevi Ovtsharenko, Platnick & Song, 1992 – Kazakhstan, Kyrgyzstan
- G. taurica Thorell, 1875 – Bulgaria to China
- G. tenebrosa Fox, 1938 – probably Mexico
- G. tetrica Simon, 1878 – France, Macedonia
- G. tigrina Simon, 1878 – Mediterranean, Russia (Europe, South Siberia)
- G. tumd Tang, Song & Zhang, 2001 – China
- G. tunevae Marusik & Omelko, 2014 – Mongolia
- G. tuvinica Marusik & Logunov, 1992 – Russia (West and South Siberia), Mongolia
- G. ukrainica Ovtsharenko, Platnick & Song, 1992 – Ukraine, Russia (Europe to Central Asia), Iran, Turkmenistan
- G. utahana Banks, 1904 – USA
- G. wiehlei Schenkel, 1963 – Russia (South Siberia), Mongolia, China
- G. xieae Zhang & Yin, 2001 – China
- G. zeugitana Pavesi, 1880 – North Africa
- G. zhaoi Ovtsharenko, Platnick & Song, 1992 – China
- G. zonsteini Ovtsharenko, Platnick & Song, 1992 – Kyrgyzstan
- G. zyuzini Ovtsharenko, Platnick & Song, 1992 – Kazakhstan
