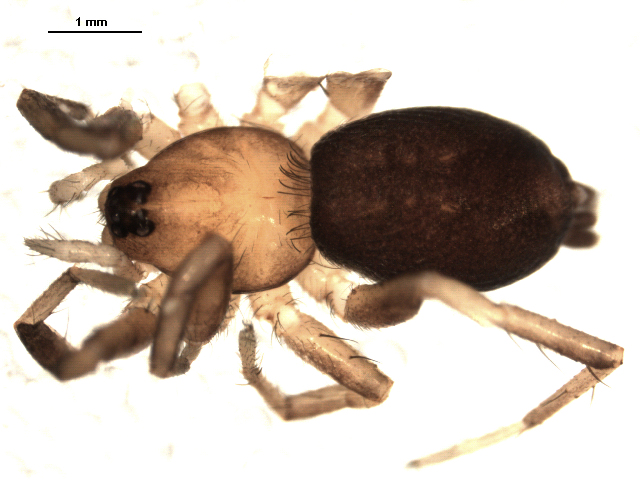

Conservation status
- Secure (NatureServe)

Scientific classification
- Kingdom: Animalia
- Phylum: Arthropoda
- Subphylum: Chelicerata
- Class: Arachnida
- Order: Araneae
- Infraorder: Araneomorphae
- Family: Gnaphosidae
- Genus: Callilepis
- Species: C. pluto

Binomial name
- Callilepis pluto Banks, 1896

Synonyms
- Callilepis femoralis Banks, 1911

= Callilepis pluto =

Species of spider

Callilepis pluto is a species of ground spider in the family Gnaphosidae. It is found in the United States and Canada.
