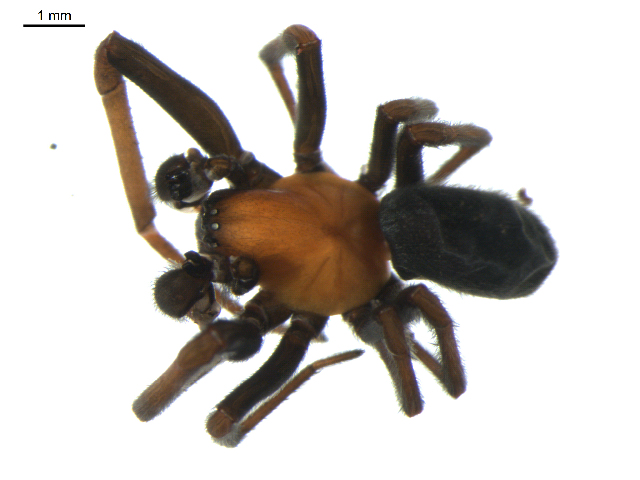
- T. americana, adult male
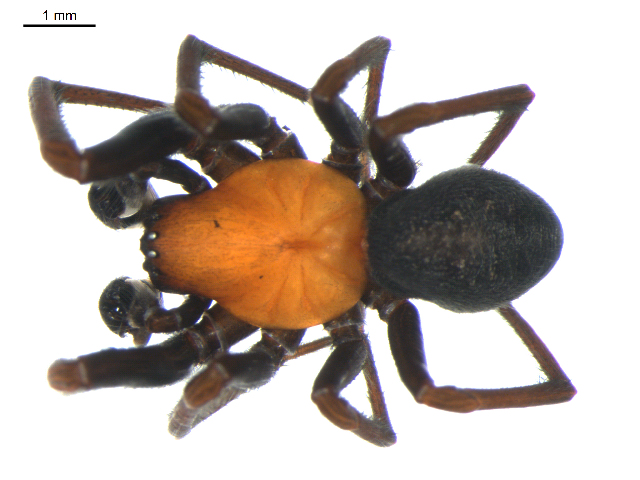
- T. americana, adult male

Scientific classification
- Kingdom: Animalia
- Phylum: Arthropoda
- Subphylum: Chelicerata
- Class: Arachnida
- Order: Araneae
- Infraorder: Araneomorphae
- Family: Titanoecidae
- Genus: Titanoeca; Thorell, 1870

Type species
- Theridion 4-guttatum Hahn, 1833

Species
- See text.

Diversity
- 32 species
- blue: reported countries (WSC)

= Titanoeca =

Genus of spiders

Titanoeca is a genus of spiders in the family Titanoecidae.

== Distribution ==
Spiders in this genus are found mainly in Eurasia, with three species found only in North America (T. americana, T. brunnea, T. nigrella). One species (T. nivalis) has a holarctic distribution, and T. guayaquilensis is endemic to Ecuador.

The species formerly known as Titanoeca obscura was renamed to T. quadriguttata.

== Species ==
As of January 2026, this genus includes 31 species:

- Titanoeca altaica Song & Zhou, 1994 – China
- Titanoeca americana Emerton, 1888 – North America
- Titanoeca asimilis Song & Zhu, 1985 – Russia (South Siberia), Kazakhstan, Mongolia, India, China
- Titanoeca brunnea Emerton, 1888 – Canada, United States
- Titanoeca caspia Ponomarev, 2020 – Russia (Europe, Caucasus)
- Titanoeca caucasica Dunin, 1985 – Turkey, Caucasus (Russia, Georgia, Azerbaijan), Iran
- Titanoeca deltshevi Naumova, 2019 – Bulgaria
- Titanoeca eca Marusik, 1995 – Kazakhstan
- Titanoeca flavicoma L. Koch, 1872 – France (Corsica), Italy, Albania, North Macedonia, Bulgaria, Greece, Turkey, Israel
- Titanoeca gyirongensis Hu, 2001 – China
- Titanoeca hispanica Wunderlich, 1995 – Spain, France
- Titanoeca incerta (Nosek, 1905) – Turkey
- Titanoeca intermedia Caporiacco, 1934 – Pakistan, India
- Titanoeca lehtineni Fet, 1986 – Central Asia, Iran?
- Titanoeca lianyuanensis Xu, Yin & Bao, 2002 – China
- Titanoeca liaoningensis Zhu, Gao & Guan, 1993 – Russia (South Siberia), Mongolia, China
- Titanoeca mae Song, Zhang & Zhu, 2002 – Russia (South Siberia), China
- Titanoeca minuta Marusik, 1995 – Kazakhstan
- Titanoeca monticola (Simon, 1870) – Portugal, Spain, France, Italy
- Titanoeca nigrella (Chamberlin, 1919) – Canada, United States, Mexico
- Titanoeca nivalis Simon, 1874 – North America, Scandinavia, Pyrenees (Spain, France), Alps (France, Switzerland, Austria, Italy), Georgia, Russia (Middle Siberia to Far East)
- Titanoeca praefica (Simon, 1870) – Portugal, Spain, France, Algeria, Russia (Europe)
- Titanoeca quadriguttata (Hahn, 1833) – Europe, Russia (Europe to South Siberia), Kazakhstan, China
- Titanoeca schineri L. Koch, 1872 – Europe, Turkey, Caucasus, Russia (Europe to South Siberia), Iran, Central Asia
- Titanoeca sharmai (Bastawade, 2008) – India
- Titanoeca sibirica L. Koch, 1879 – Russia (Europe to Far East)
- Titanoeca spominima (Taczanowski, 1866) – Sweden, Finland, Central Europe, Serbia, Albania, Ukraine, Russia (Europe)
- Titanoeca tristis L. Koch, 1872 – Europe, Turkey, Caucasus
- Titanoeca turkmenia Wunderlich, 1995 – Albania, Bulgaria, Greece, Russia (Europe), Kazakhstan, Iran, Turkmenistan
- Titanoeca ukrainica Guryanova, 1992 – Ukraine, Russia (Europe, Caucasus), Georgia, Iran
- Titanoeca veteranica Herman, 1879 – Central, South-eastern and Eastern Europe, Russia (Europe to South Siberia), Azerbaijan, Kazakhstan, Turkmenistan
