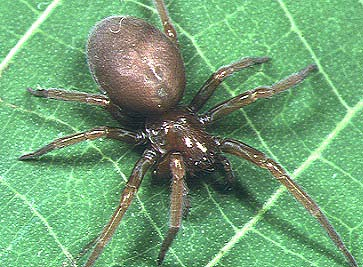
- Female

Scientific classification
- Kingdom: Animalia
- Phylum: Arthropoda
- Subphylum: Chelicerata
- Class: Arachnida
- Order: Araneae
- Infraorder: Araneomorphae
- Family: Titanoecidae
- Genus: Pandava
- Species: P. laminata

Binomial name
- Pandava laminata (Thorell, 1878)

Synonyms
- Amaurobius laminatus Thorell, 1878; Amaurobius castaneiceps Simon, 1893; Titanoeca birmanica Thorell, 1895; Amaurobius taprobanicola Strand, 1907; Amaurobius chinesicus Strand, 1907; Titanoeca fulmeki Reimoser, 1927; Syrorisa mumfordi Berland, 1933

= Pandava laminata =

Species of spider

Padava laminata is a species of araneomorph spider in the family Titanoecidae. It is widely distributed from East Africa through China to New Guinea and the Marquesas Islands.

== Description ==
Pandava laminata has a brownish body and legs with a much paler abdomen and darker brown chelicerae (fangs). Males have more varied colouring than females, with darker brown around the head area and yellowish brown on the sternum as well as on the second to fourth pairs of legs. Females range from about 6–8 mm in total body length, males being slightly smaller at about 5.5–6 mm. Like all titanoecids, males have a complex projection (apophysis) on the tibia of their palps, with three main parts (lobes). In Pandava laminata males the lobe closest to the spider's mouth (the prolateral lobe) is undivided and short. The female epigyne is semi-circular; the anterior rims are longer than their distance apart.

== Distribution ==
Padava laminata is native to Tanzania, Kenya, Madagascar, Sri Lanka through China to New Guinea and the Marquesas Islands. It has been introduced to Germany and Hungary. In Germany it was discovered for the first time at Cologne Zoo. The species was most likely introduced with plants or cargo from Southeast Asia.
