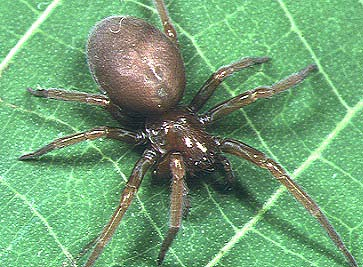
- Pandava laminata female

Scientific classification
- Domain: Eukaryota
- Kingdom: Animalia
- Phylum: Arthropoda
- Subphylum: Chelicerata
- Class: Arachnida
- Order: Araneae
- Infraorder: Araneomorphae
- Family: Titanoecidae
- Genus: Pandava; Lehtinen, 1967

= Pandava (spider) =

Genus of spiders

Pandava is a genus of araneomorph spiders in the family Titanoecidae.

== Taxonomy ==
In 1967, Pekka T. Lehtinen transferred the species Amaurobius laminatus, first described by Tamerlan Thorell in 1878, into his newly created genus Pandava as P. laminata, placing it in the family Titanoecidae. Over 30 years later, in 2001, a further species, Pandava hunanensis, was added to the genus. A major revision of Pandava in 2010 saw five new species being added.

== Diagnosis ==
Male spiders placed in the genus Pandava differ from other species of Titanoecidae in features of the palpal bulb: the tegular process (a projection from the tegulum) is smaller; the median apophysis (one of the hardened plates making up the palpal bulb) is thumb-shaped. Females differ in features of the epigynum: the copulatory openings are more anterior.

== Species ==
As of July 2022, the World Spider Catalog accepted eleven species:

- Pandava andhraca (Patel & Reddy, 1990) – India
- Pandava aruni Bodkhe, Uniyal, Kamble, Manthen, Santape & Chikhale, 2017 – India
- Pandava banna Lin & Li, 2022 – China
- Pandava ganesha Almeida-Silva, Griswold & Brescovit, 2010 – India
- Pandava ganga Almeida-Silva, Griswold & Brescovit, 2010 – India
- Pandava hunanensis Yin & Bao, 2001 – China
- Pandava kama Almeida-Silva, Griswold & Brescovit, 2010 – India
- Pandava laminata (Thorell, 1878) (type species) – Tanzania, Kenya, Madagascar, India, Sri Lanka to China, Indonesia, Philippines, Micronesia, French Polynesia. Introduced to Britain, Netherlands, Germany, Poland, Hungary
- Pandava nathabhaii (Patel & Patel, 1975) – India
- Pandava sarasvati Almeida-Silva, Griswold & Brescovit, 2010 – Myanmar, Thailand
- Pandava shiva Almeida-Silva, Griswold & Brescovit, 2010 – India, Pakistan
