= Pluto, West Virginia =

Pluto
- Unincorporated community
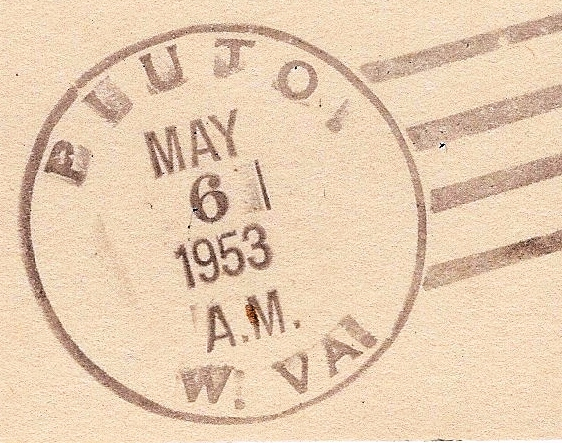
- Postmark from Pluto, West Virginia

- Location within the state of West Virginia Pluto (the United States)
- Coordinates: 37°42′37″N 80°59′32″W
- Country: United States
- State: West Virginia
- County: Raleigh
- Elevation: 846 ft (258 m)
- Time zone: UTC-5 (Eastern (EST))
  - Summer (DST): UTC-4 (EDT)
- GNIS ID: 1549878

Pluto is an unincorporated community in Raleigh County, West Virginia. The elevation is 2,589 feet.

== History ==
The community was named after Pluto from Greek mythology.

A community landmark is the Pluto Missionary Baptist Church, known as the Old Log Church. According to a 1971 column by Shirley Donnelly, the church was established in 1893 on land donated by Jim Meador. The logs from Meador’s property were sawed and hewn by Jesse Harris. The pulpit in the new church was crafted by Gus Samples, local carpenter and joiner.
