= Pluto Peak =

Mountain in New Zealand

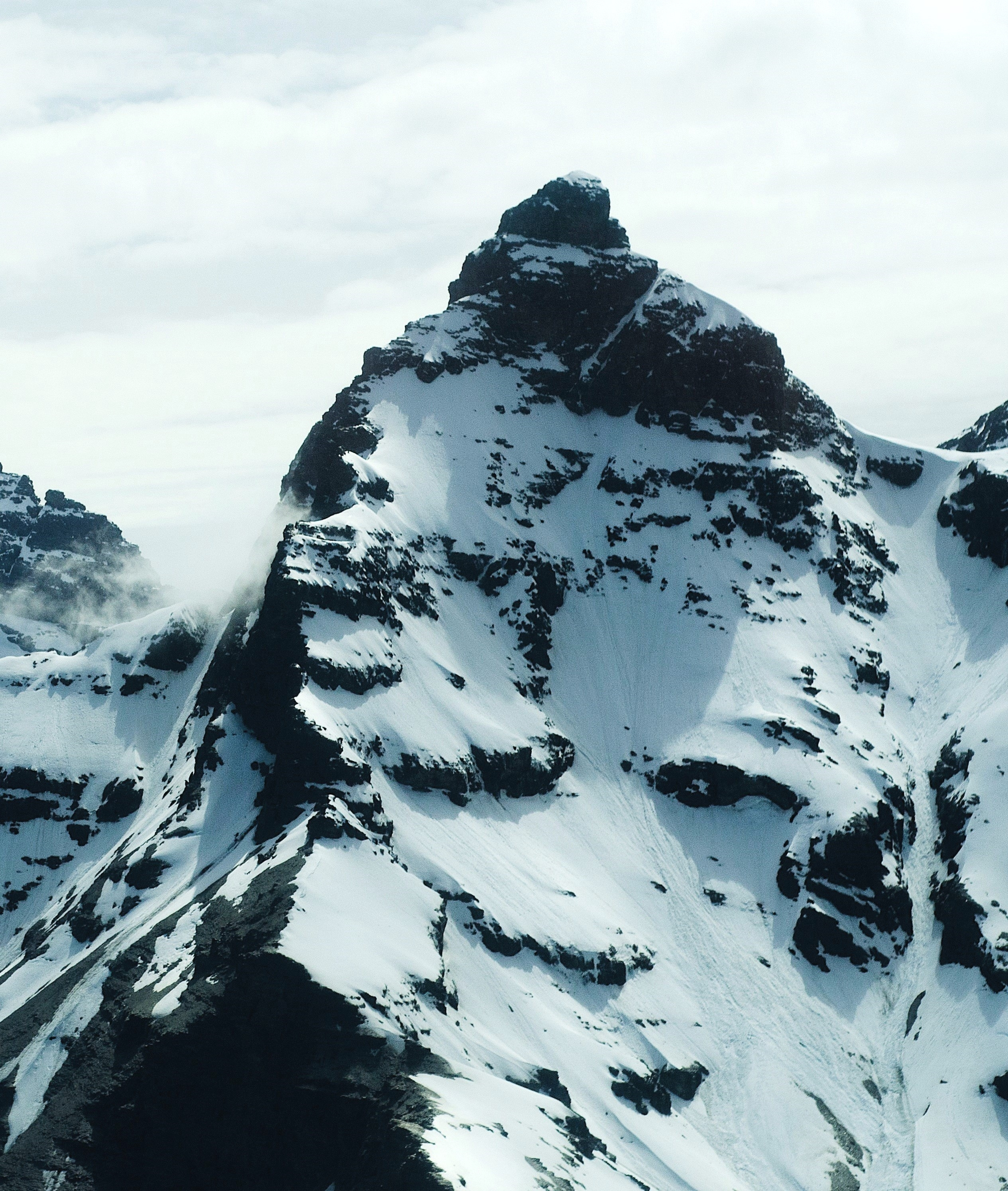
- Southwest aspect

Highest point
- Elevation: 2,480 m (8,136 ft)
- Prominence: 260 m (853 ft)
- Isolation: 1.35 km (0.84 mi)
- Coordinates: 44.61538179°S 168.3862745°E

Geography
- Location within New Zealand
- Interactive map of Pluto Peak
- Location: South Island
- Country: New Zealand
- Region: Otago
- Protected area: Mount Aspiring National Park
- Parent range: Southern Alps; Forbes Mountains
- Topo map(s): NZMS260 E40; Topo50 CA10

Climbing
- First ascent: December 1931

Pluto Peak is a 2,480-metre-elevation (8,136-foot) mountain in Otago, New Zealand.

== Description ==
Pluto Peak is located 26 kilometres north of Glenorchy, New Zealand, in the Southern Alps of the South Island. It is set within Mount Aspiring National Park which is part of the Te Wahipounamu UNESCO World Heritage Site. The peak is part of the Forbes Mountains which are a subrange of the Southern Alps. Precipitation runoff from the mountain's slopes drains to the Dart River / Te Awa Whakatipu. Topographic relief is significant as the summit rises 2,000 metres (6,562 feet) above the Dart Valley in three kilometres. The nearest higher neighbour is Mount Earnslaw, 1.35 kilometres to the southeast. This mountain's toponym has been officially approved by the New Zealand Geographic Board.

== Climate ==
Based on the Köppen climate classification, Pluto Peak is located in a marine west coast climate zone, with a subpolar oceanic climate (Cfc) at the summit. Prevailing westerly winds blow moist air from the Tasman Sea onto the mountain, where the air is forced upwards by the mountains (orographic lift), causing moisture to drop in the form of rain and snow. The months of December through February offer the most favourable weather for viewing or climbing this peak.

== Climbing ==
The first ascent of the summit was made in December 1931 by J.A. Sim, V.J. Leader, and K. Grinling.

Climbing routes:

- North West Face – J.A. Sim, V.J. Leader, K. Grinling – (1931)
- South Buttress – Russell Braddock, L. Braddock – (2009)

== Gallery ==
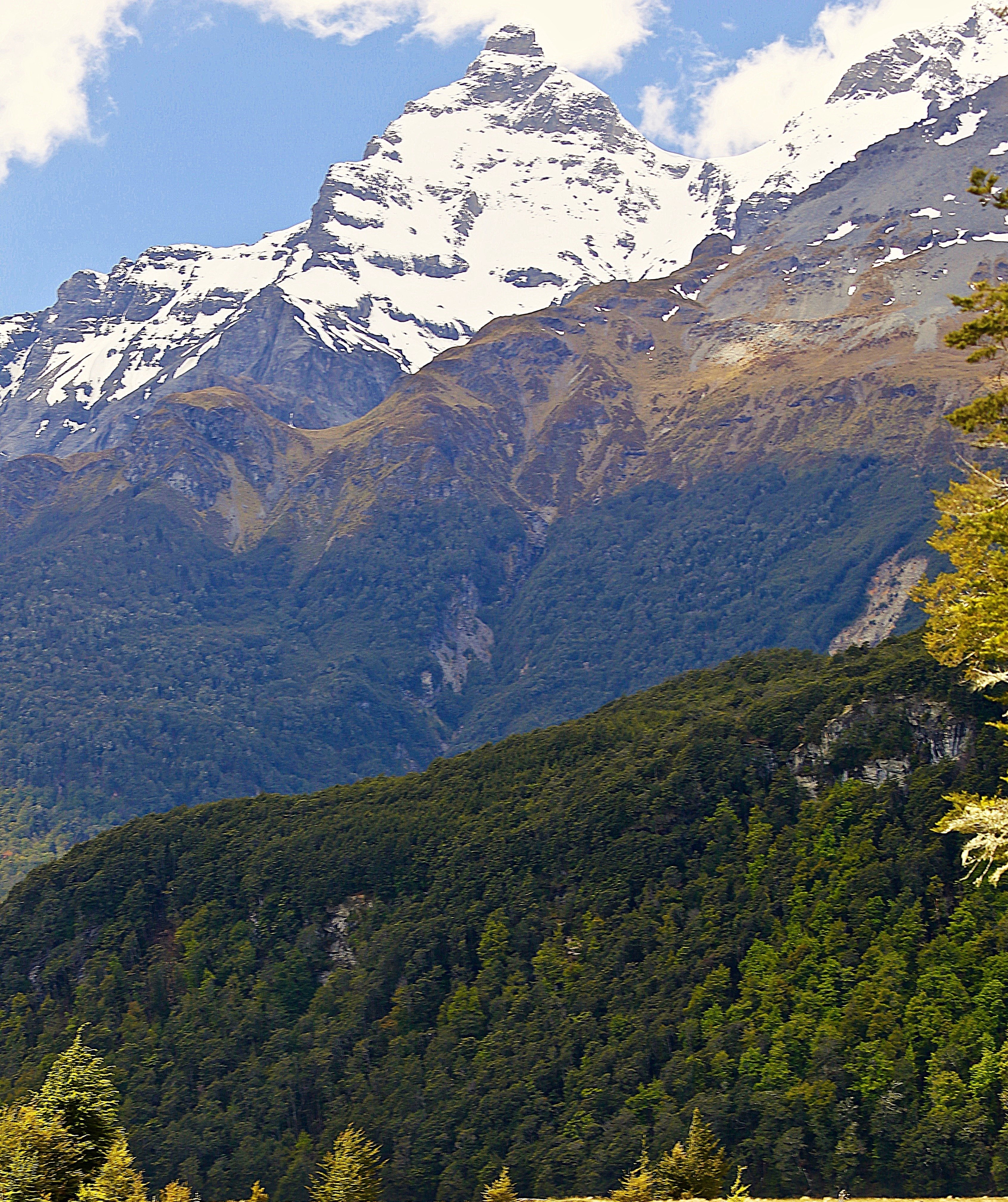
Southwest aspect of Pluto Peak rises above the Dart River Valley

== See also ==
- List of mountains of New Zealand by height
