= Pluteus (disambiguation) =

Pluteus is a large genus of fungi. It may also refer to:

- Pluteus (sculpture), a balustrade made up of massive rectangular slabs which divides part of a building in half
- Pluteus in ancient Roman architecture is a low wall connecting bases of pillars e.g. in a peristyle
- Pluteus larva, the larval stage of echinoderms
- Pluteo 29.1, also known as Pluteus 29.1, an illuminated manuscript
- Mantlet, known as pluteus or pluteo in several languages
