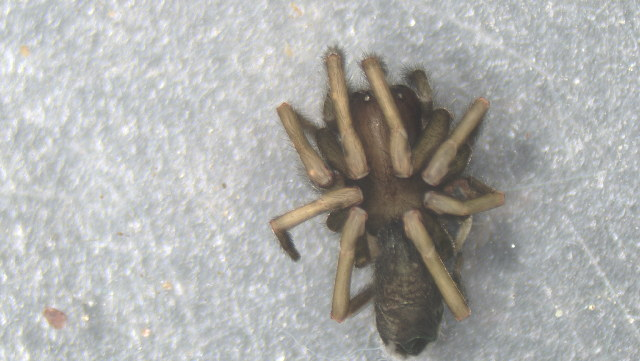
- G. patellaris, female

Scientific classification
- Kingdom: Animalia
- Phylum: Arthropoda
- Subphylum: Chelicerata
- Class: Arachnida
- Order: Araneae
- Infraorder: Araneomorphae
- Family: Titanoecidae
- Genus: Goeldia; Keyserling, 1891

Type species
- G. leechi Almeida-Silva & Brescovit, 2024

Species
- 18 species, see text

= Goeldia =

Genus of spiders

Goeldia is a genus of spiders that occur in Central to South America. It was first described by Keyserling in 1891. One species, Goeldia funesta, has been introduced to the United States.

== Species ==
As of November 2024 it contains eighteen species:

- Goeldia bagumbubu Almeida-Silva & Brescovit, 2024 - Brazil
- Goeldia chinipensis Leech, 1972 - Mexico
- Goeldia diva Almeida-Silva & Brescovit, 2024 - Brazil
- Goeldia funesta Almeida-Silva & Brescovit, 2024 - Colombia, Ecuador, Peru. Introduced to USA
- Goeldia gauderio Almeida-Silva & Brescovit, 2024 - Brazil
- Goeldia goytacazes Almeida-Silva & Brescovit, 2024 - Brazil
- Goeldia guayaquilensis (Schmidt, 1971) - Ecuador, Peru
- Goeldia leechi Almeida-Silva & Brescovit, 2024 - Bolivia, Brazil, Chile, Argentina
- Goeldia luteipes (Keyserling, 1891) - Venezuela, Bolivia, Brazil, Uruguay, Argentina
- Goeldia mexicana (O. P.-Cambridge, 1896) - Mexico, Honduras, Costa Rica, Panama
- Goeldia mirim Almeida-Silva & Brescovit, 2024 - Brazil
- Goeldia nigra (Mello-Leitão, 1917) - Brazil, Argentina
- Goeldia obscura (Keyserling, 1878) - Colombia
- Goeldia patellaris (Simon, 1892) - Venezuela, Brazil
- Goeldia portenha Almeida-Silva & Brescovit, 2024 - Brazil, Argentina
- Goeldia tizamina (misplaced in Goeldia) (Chamberlin & Ivie, 1938) - Mexico
- Goeldia utcuyacu Almeida-Silva & Brescovit, 2024 - Peru
- Goeldia zyngierae (Almeida-Silva, Brescovit & Dias, 2009) - Bolivia, Brazil, Paraguay, Argentina
