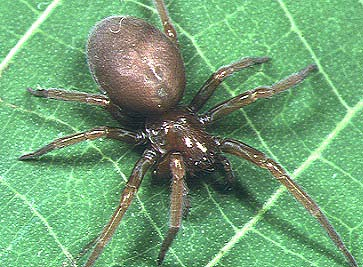
- female Pandava laminata

Scientific classification
- Kingdom: Animalia
- Phylum: Arthropoda
- Subphylum: Chelicerata
- Class: Arachnida
- Order: Araneae
- Infraorder: Araneomorphae
- Family: Titanoecidae; Lehtinen, 1967

Diversity
- 5 genera, 67 species
- blue: reported countries (WSC) green: observation hotspots (iNaturalist)

= Titanoecidae =

Family of spiders

Titanoecidae is a family of araneomorph spiders first described by Pekka T. Lehtinen in 1967. It is fairly widespread in the New World and Eurasia with five genera and more than 50 species worldwide.

These are mostly dark-colored builders of "woolly" (cribellate) silk webs. Several species are found at relatively high altitudes in mountain ranges and may be very common in such habitats.

== Genera ==
As of January 2026, this family includes five genera and 67 species:

- Anuvinda Lehtinen, 1967 – China, Laos, Thailand, India, Nepal
- Goeldia Keyserling, 1891 – Costa Rica, Honduras, Panama, Mexico, South America. Introduced to United States
- Nurscia Simon, 1874 – Iran, Turkey, Russia, Portugal, Spain, France, North Africa, Asia. Introduced to Britain
- Pandava Lehtinen, 1967 – Kenya, Madagascar, Tanzania, Asia, French Polynesia
- Titanoeca Thorell, 1870 – Algeria, Asia, Europe, North America

== See also ==
- Titanoecoidea
