= Omorgus elongatus =

Scientific classification
- Kingdom: Animalia
- Phylum: Arthropoda
- Class: Insecta
- Order: Coleoptera
- Suborder: Polyphaga
- Infraorder: Scarabaeiformia
- Family: Trogidae
- Genus: Omorgus
- Species: O. elongatus

Binomial name
- Omorgus elongatus Haaf, 1954

Species of beetle

Omorgus elongatus is a species of hide beetle in the subfamily Omorginae.
