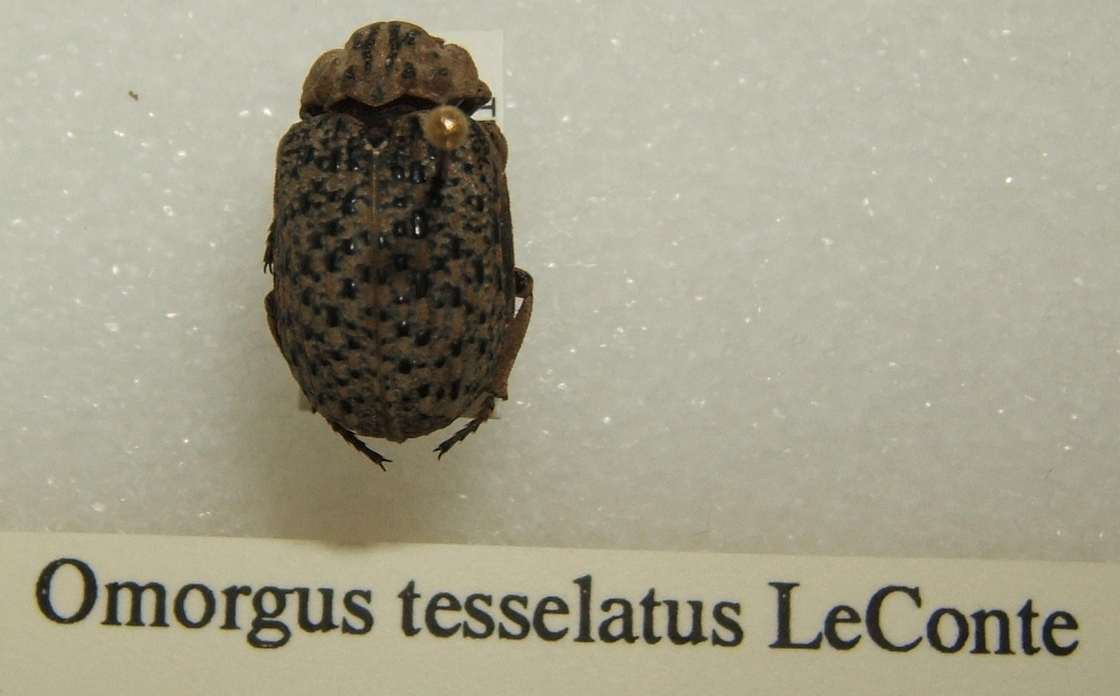
- Omorgus tessellatus, adult

Scientific classification
- Kingdom: Animalia
- Phylum: Arthropoda
- Class: Insecta
- Order: Coleoptera
- Suborder: Polyphaga
- Infraorder: Scarabaeiformia
- Family: Trogidae
- Genus: Omorgus
- Species: O. tessellatus

Binomial name
- Omorgus tessellatus LeConte, 1854

= Omorgus tessellatus =

Species of beetle

Omorgus tessellatus is a beetle of the family Trogidae.

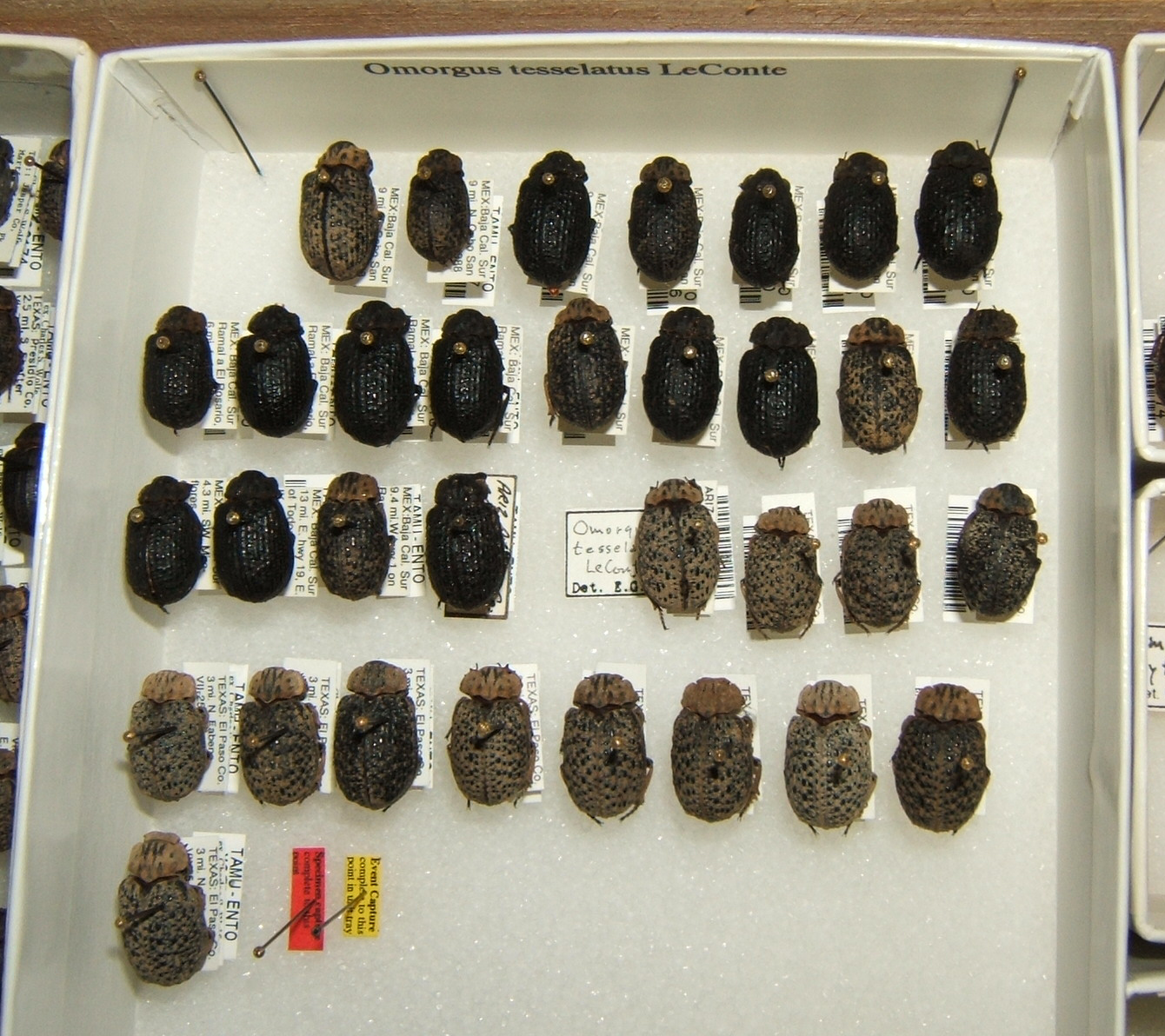
Omorgus tessellatus variation
