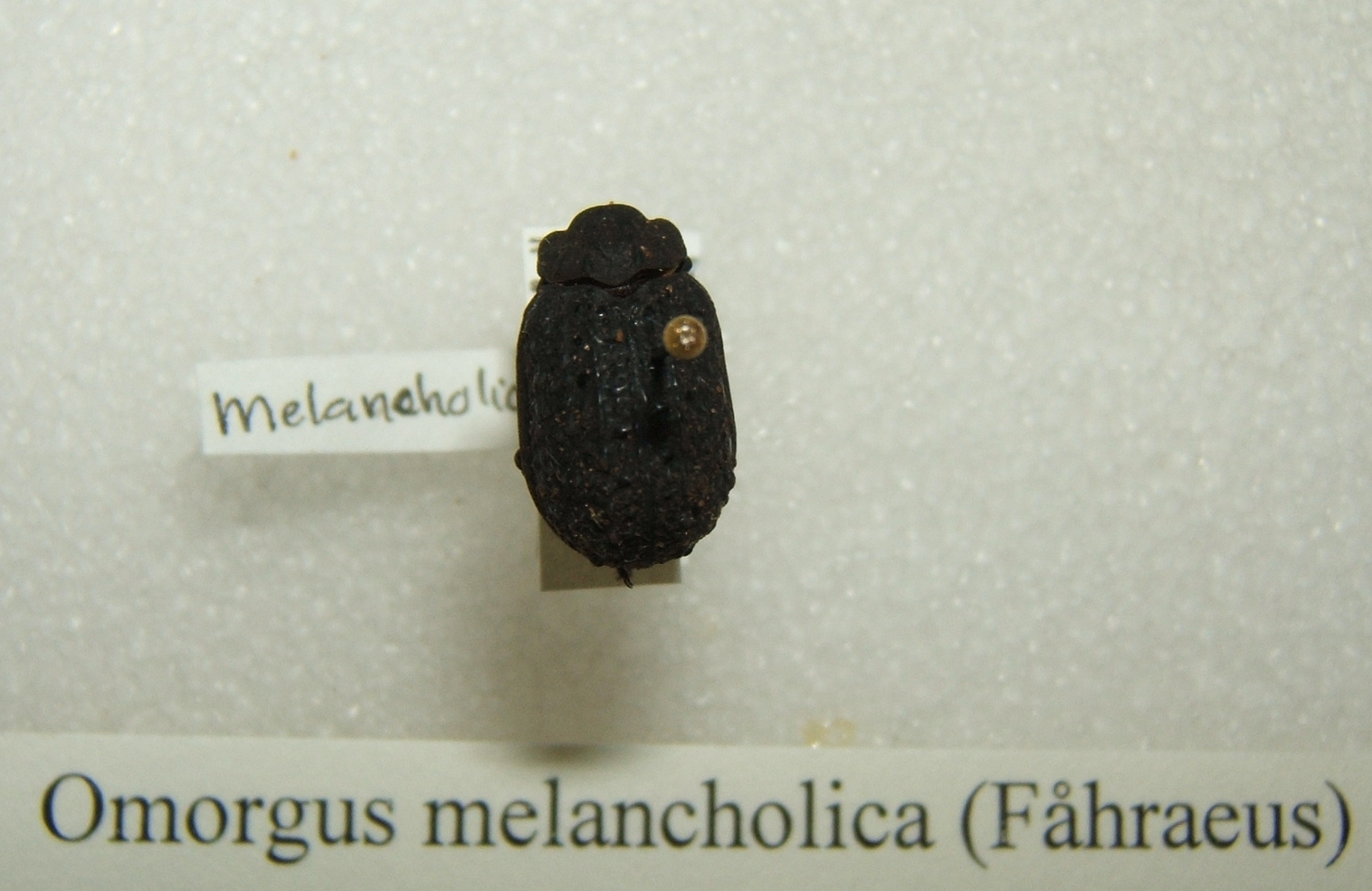
- Omorgus melancholicus, adult

Scientific classification
- Kingdom: Animalia
- Phylum: Arthropoda
- Class: Insecta
- Order: Coleoptera
- Suborder: Polyphaga
- Infraorder: Scarabaeiformia
- Family: Trogidae
- Genus: Omorgus
- Species: O. melancholicus

Binomial name
- Omorgus melancholicus Fåhraeus, 1857

= Omorgus melancholicus =

Species of beetle

Omorgus melancholicus is a beetle of the family Trogidae.
