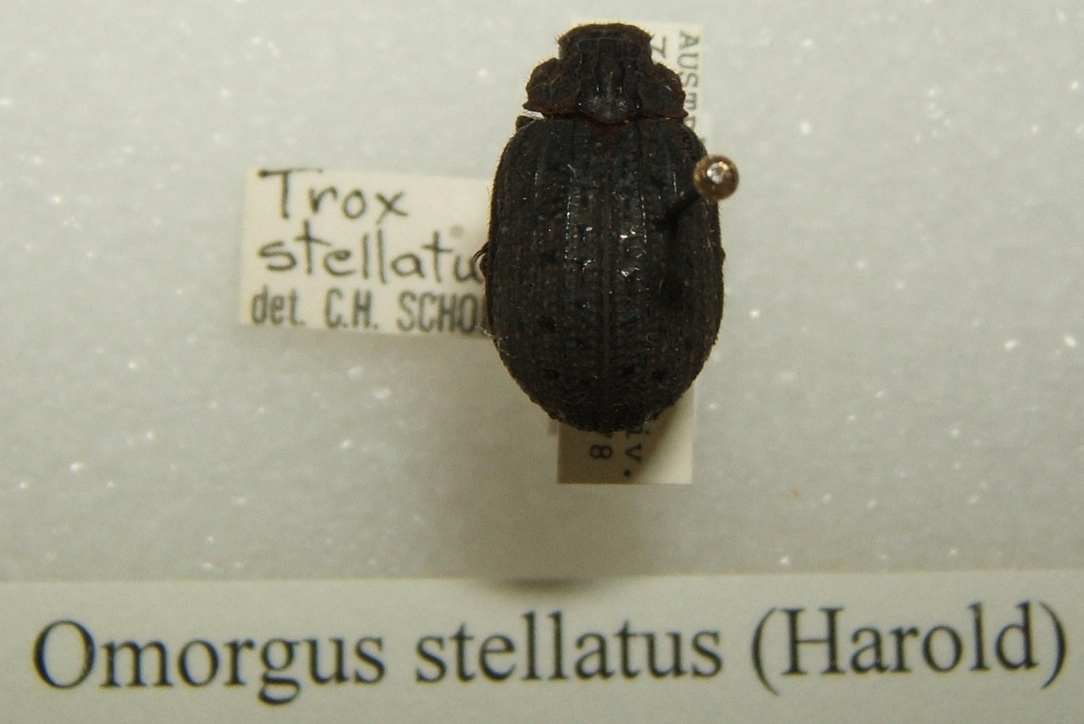
- Omorgus stellatus, adult

Scientific classification
- Kingdom: Animalia
- Phylum: Arthropoda
- Class: Insecta
- Order: Coleoptera
- Suborder: Polyphaga
- Infraorder: Scarabaeiformia
- Family: Trogidae
- Genus: Omorgus
- Species: O. stellatus

Binomial name
- Omorgus stellatus (Harold)

= Omorgus stellatus =

Species of beetle

Omorgus stellatus is a beetle of the family Trogidae.
