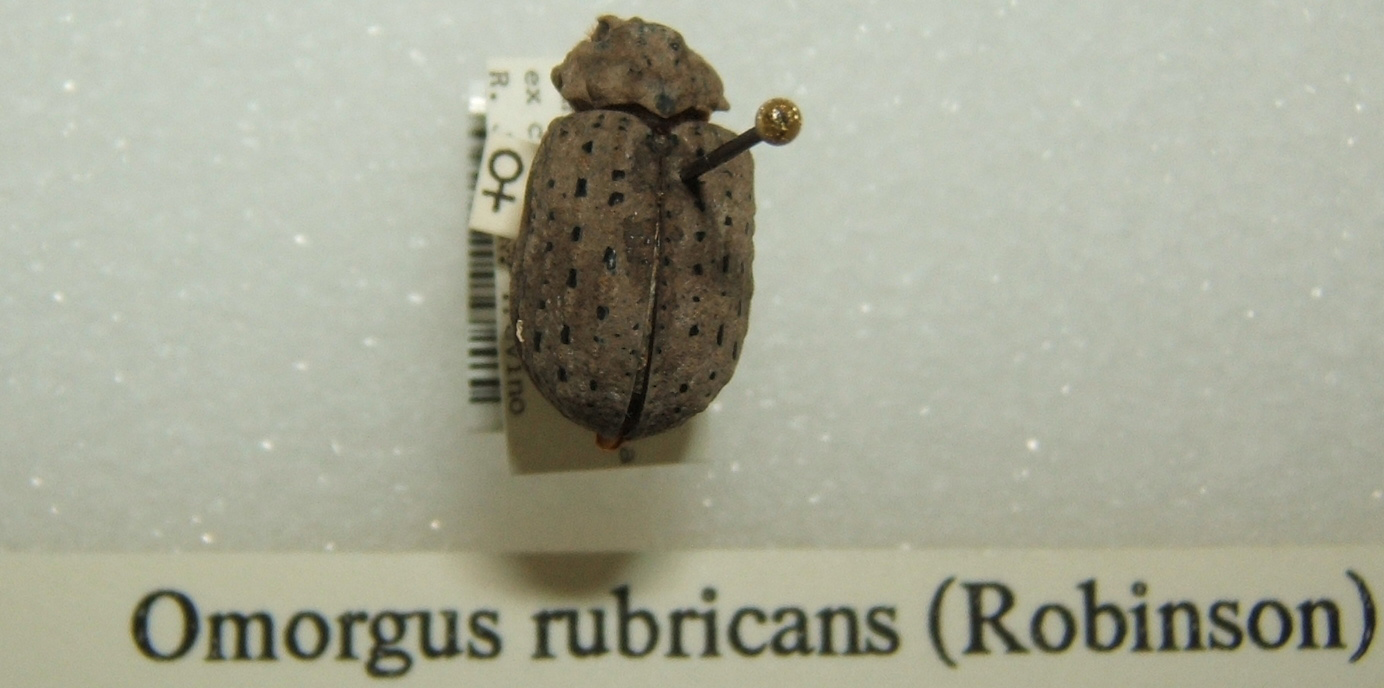
- Omorgus rubricans, adult female

Scientific classification
- Kingdom: Animalia
- Phylum: Arthropoda
- Class: Insecta
- Order: Coleoptera
- Suborder: Polyphaga
- Infraorder: Scarabaeiformia
- Family: Trogidae
- Genus: Omorgus
- Species: O. rubricans

Binomial name
- Omorgus rubricans (Robinson, 1946)

= Omorgus rubricans =

Species of beetle

Omorgus rubricans is a beetle of the family Trogidae.

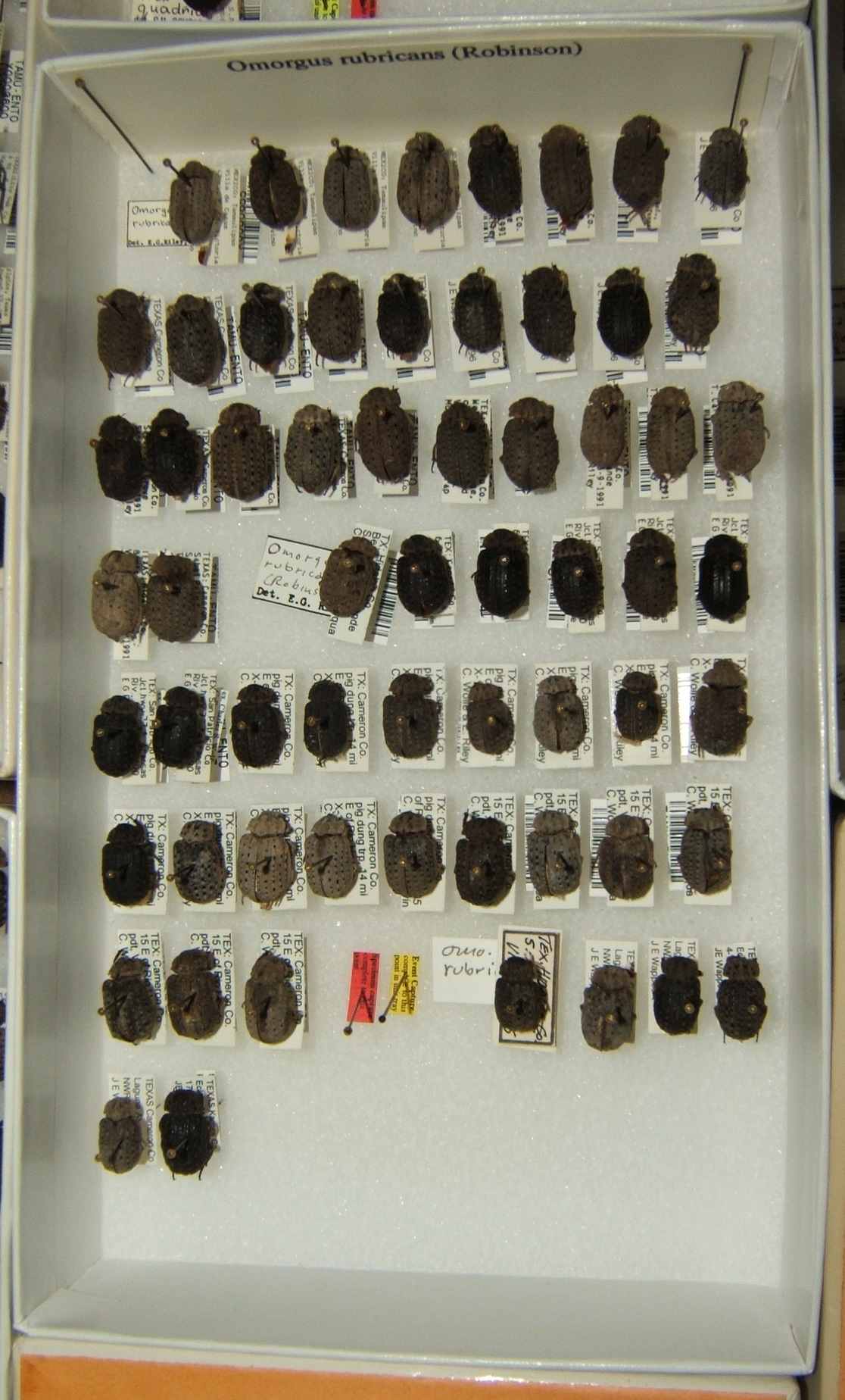
Omorgus rubricans variation
