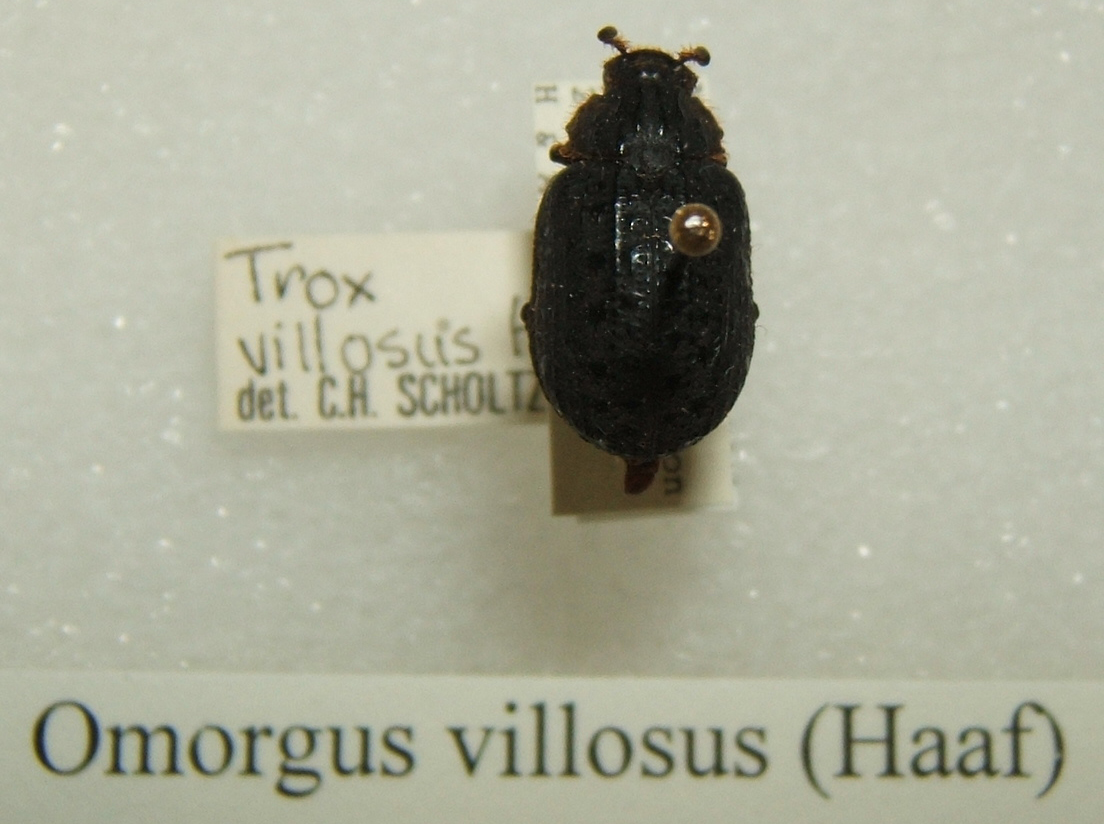
- Omorgus villosus, adult

Scientific classification
- Kingdom: Animalia
- Phylum: Arthropoda
- Class: Insecta
- Order: Coleoptera
- Suborder: Polyphaga
- Infraorder: Scarabaeiformia
- Family: Trogidae
- Genus: Omorgus
- Species: O. villosus

Binomial name
- Omorgus villosus (Haaf 1954)

= Omorgus villosus =

Species of beetle

Omorgus villosus is a beetle of the family Trogidae.
