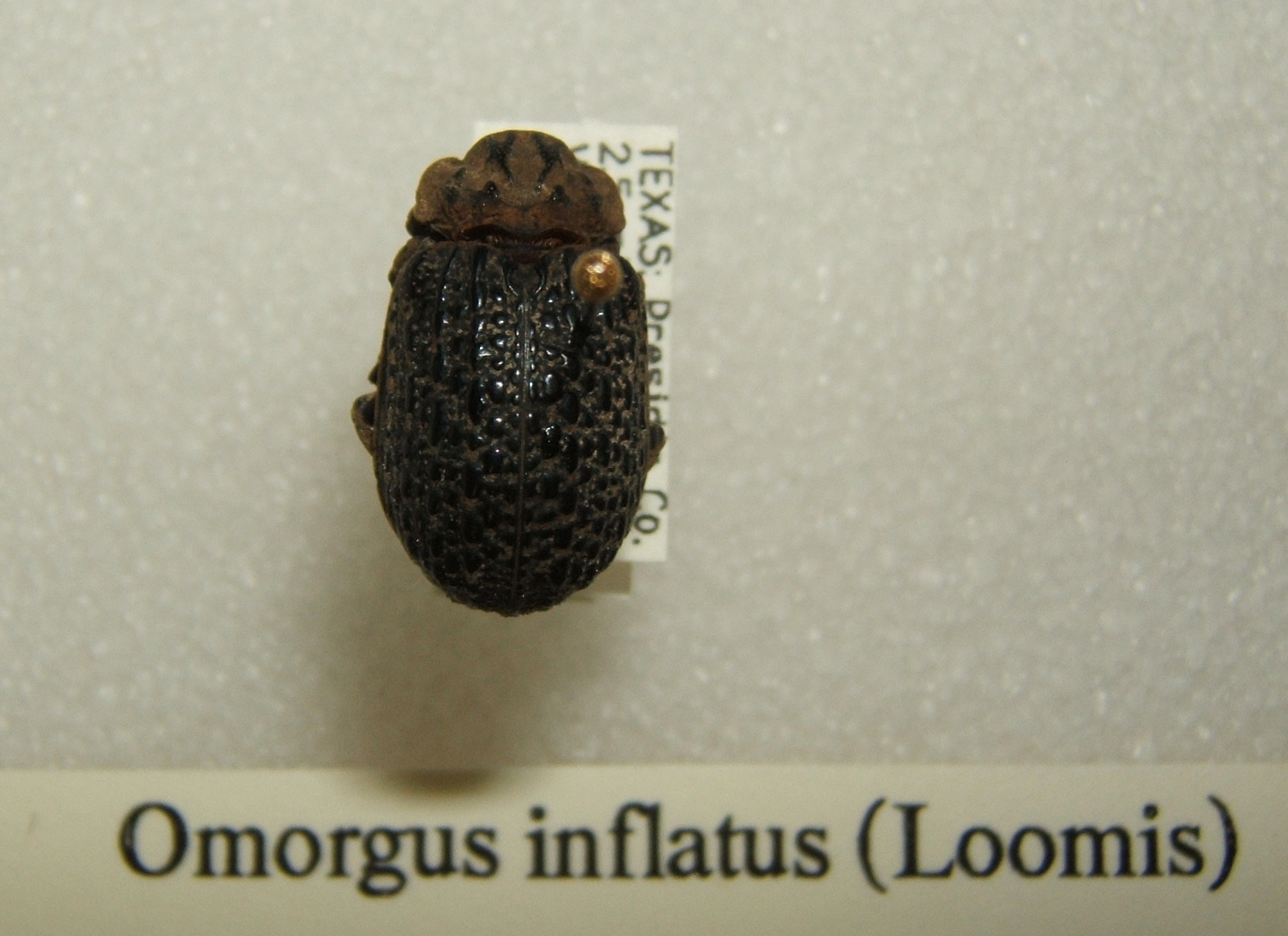
- Omorgus inflatus, adult

Scientific classification
- Kingdom: Animalia
- Phylum: Arthropoda
- Class: Insecta
- Order: Coleoptera
- Suborder: Polyphaga
- Infraorder: Scarabaeiformia
- Family: Trogidae
- Genus: Omorgus
- Species: O. inflatus

Binomial name
- Omorgus inflatus (Loomis, 1922)

= Omorgus inflatus =

Species of beetle

Omorgus inflatus is a beetle of the family Trogidae.

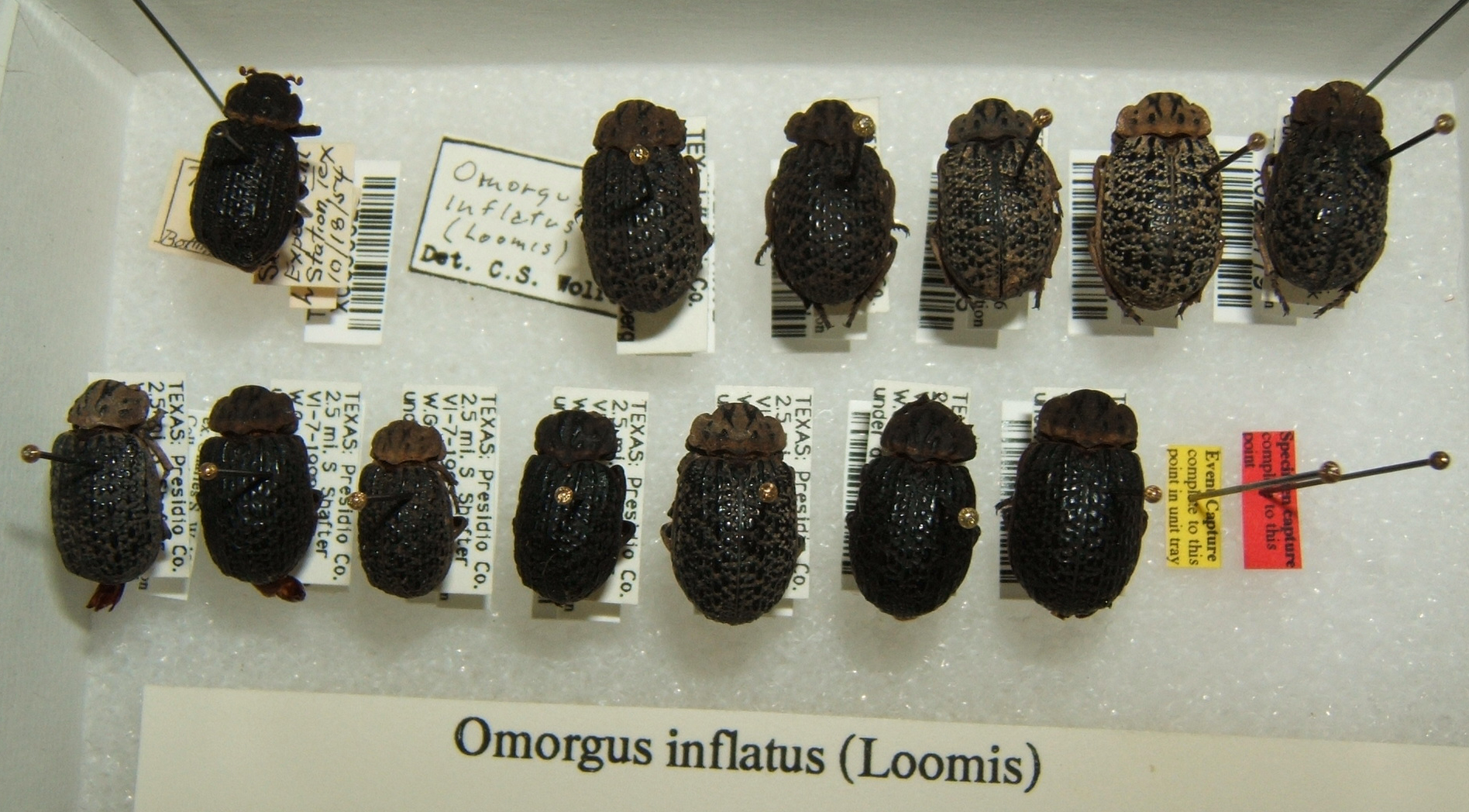
Omorgus inflatus variation
