= Omorgus varicosus =

Scientific classification
- Kingdom: Animalia
- Phylum: Arthropoda
- Class: Insecta
- Order: Coleoptera
- Suborder: Polyphaga
- Infraorder: Scarabaeiformia
- Family: Trogidae
- Genus: Omorgus
- Species: O. varicosus

Binomial name
- Omorgus varicosus Erichson, 1843

Species of beetle

Omorgus varicosus is a species of hide beetle in the subfamily Omorginae and subgenus Afromorgus.
