= Omorgus reiterorum =

Scientific classification
- Kingdom: Animalia
- Phylum: Arthropoda
- Class: Insecta
- Order: Coleoptera
- Suborder: Polyphaga
- Infraorder: Scarabaeiformia
- Family: Trogidae
- Genus: Omorgus
- Species: O. reiterorum

Binomial name
- Omorgus reiterorum Kral & Kuban, 2012

Species of beetle

Omorgus reiterorum is a species of hide beetle in the subfamily Omorginae, the genus Omorgus and subgenus Afromorgus. It is endemic to Socotra Island in Yemen.
