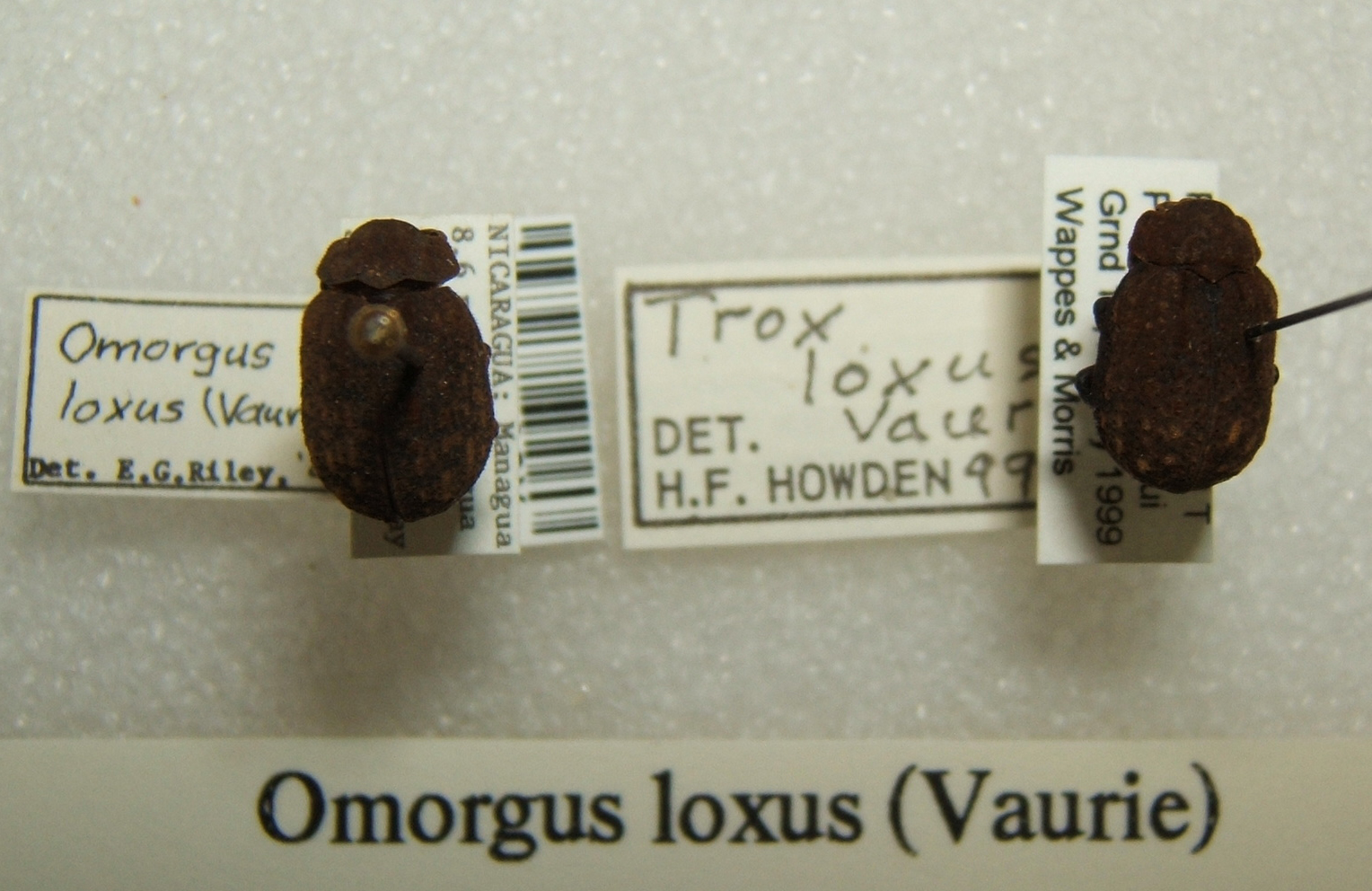
- Omorgus loxus, adult

Scientific classification
- Kingdom: Animalia
- Phylum: Arthropoda
- Class: Insecta
- Order: Coleoptera
- Suborder: Polyphaga
- Infraorder: Scarabaeiformia
- Family: Trogidae
- Genus: Omorgus
- Species: O. loxus

Binomial name
- Omorgus loxus (Vaurie, 1955)

= Omorgus loxus =

Species of beetle

Omorgus loxus is a beetle of the family Trogidae.
