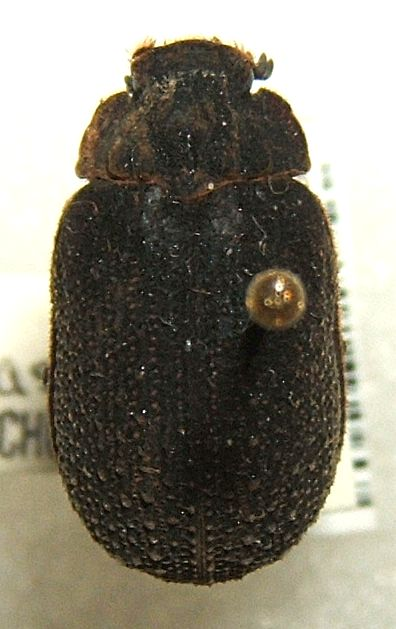
- Omorgus amictus, adult

Scientific classification
- Kingdom: Animalia
- Phylum: Arthropoda
- Class: Insecta
- Order: Coleoptera
- Suborder: Polyphaga
- Infraorder: Scarabaeiformia
- Family: Trogidae
- Genus: Omorgus
- Species: O. amictus

Binomial name
- Omorgus amictus (Haaf, 1854)

Synonyms
- Trox amictus

= Omorgus amictus =

Species of beetle

Omorgus amictus is a beetle of the Family Trogidae found in Australia.
