= Omorgus batesi =

Scientific classification
- Kingdom: Animalia
- Phylum: Arthropoda
- Class: Insecta
- Order: Coleoptera
- Suborder: Polyphaga
- Infraorder: Scarabaeiformia
- Family: Trogidae
- Genus: Omorgus
- Species: O. batesi

Binomial name
- Omorgus batesi Harold, 1872

Species of beetle

Omorgus batesi is a species of hide beetle in the subfamily Omorginae and the only species in the subgenus Haroldomorgus.
