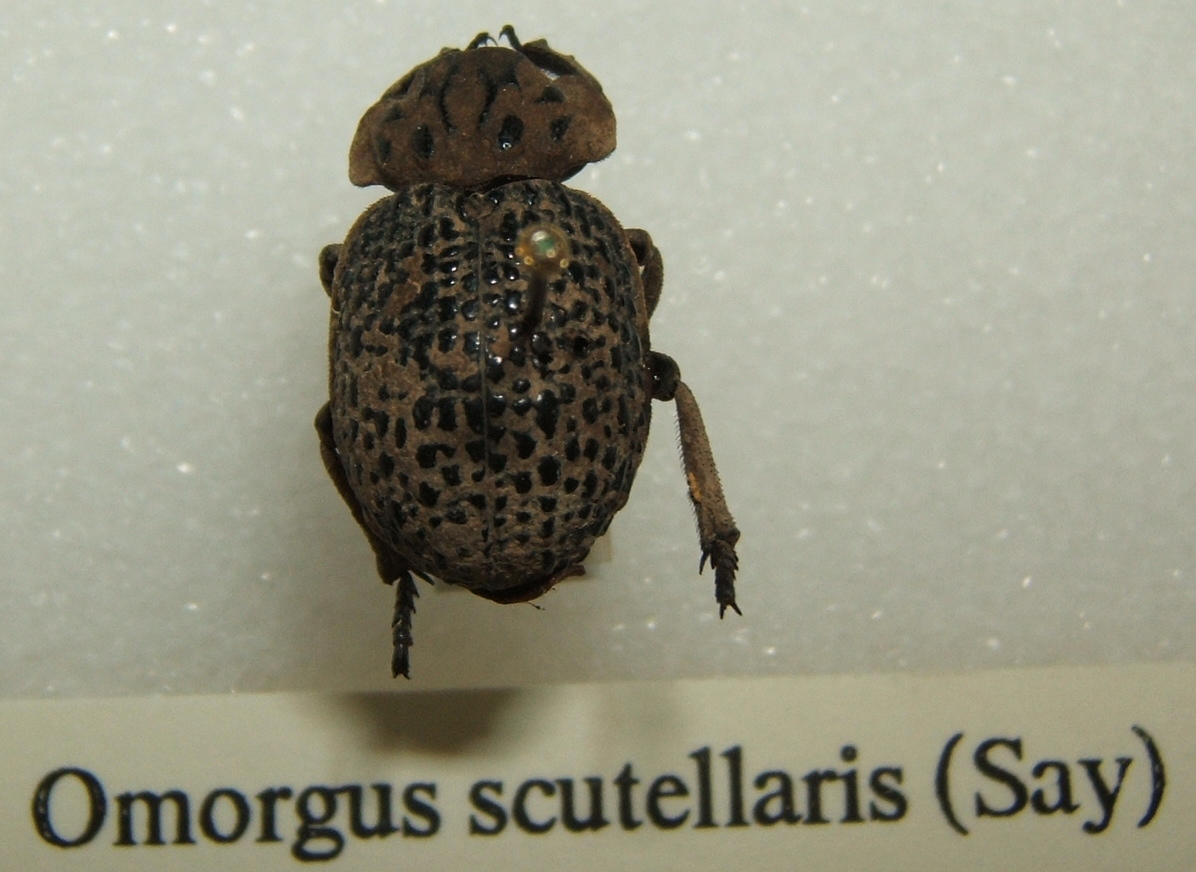
- Omorgus scutellaris, adul

Scientific classification
- Kingdom: Animalia
- Phylum: Arthropoda
- Class: Insecta
- Order: Coleoptera
- Suborder: Polyphaga
- Infraorder: Scarabaeiformia
- Family: Trogidae
- Genus: Omorgus
- Species: O. scutellaris

Binomial name
- Omorgus scutellaris (Say, 1823)

= Omorgus scutellaris =

Species of beetle

Omorgus scutellaris is a beetle of the family Trogidae. It is found in the United States and Mexico.
