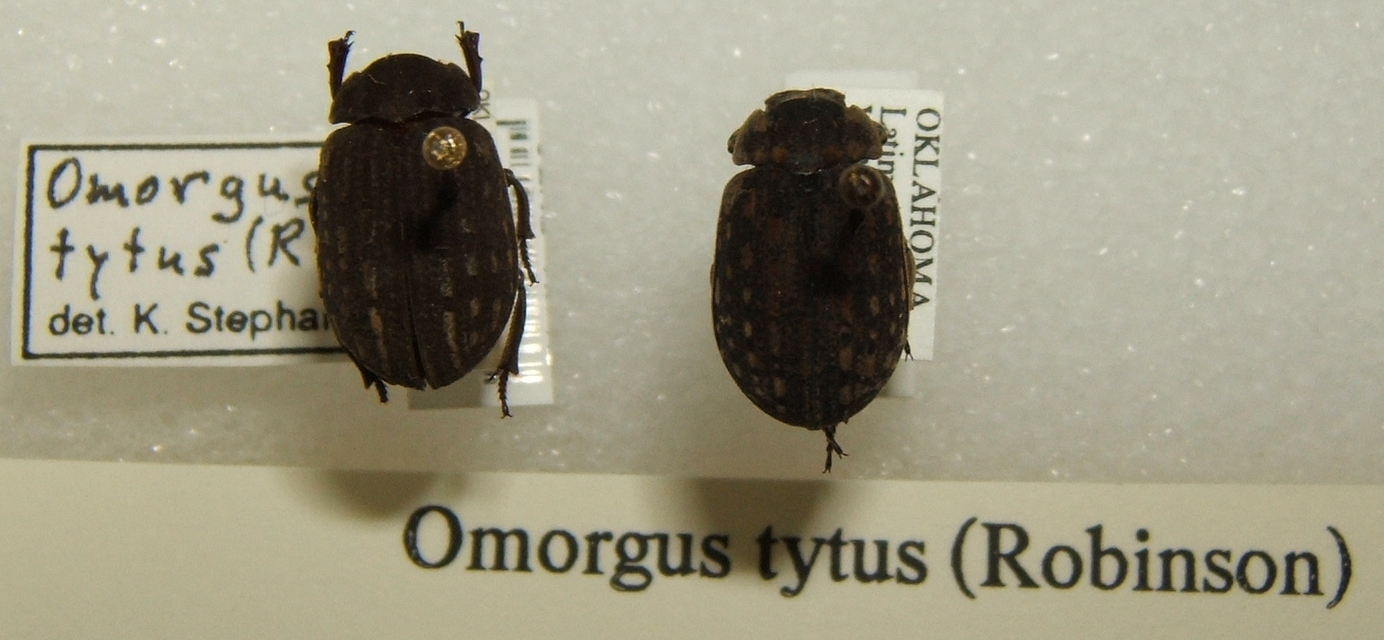
- Omorgus tytus, adult

Scientific classification
- Kingdom: Animalia
- Phylum: Arthropoda
- Class: Insecta
- Order: Coleoptera
- Suborder: Polyphaga
- Infraorder: Scarabaeiformia
- Family: Trogidae
- Genus: Omorgus
- Species: O. tytus

Binomial name
- Omorgus tytus (Robinson, 1941)

= Omorgus tytus =

Species of beetle

Omorgus tytus is a beetle of the family Trogidae.
