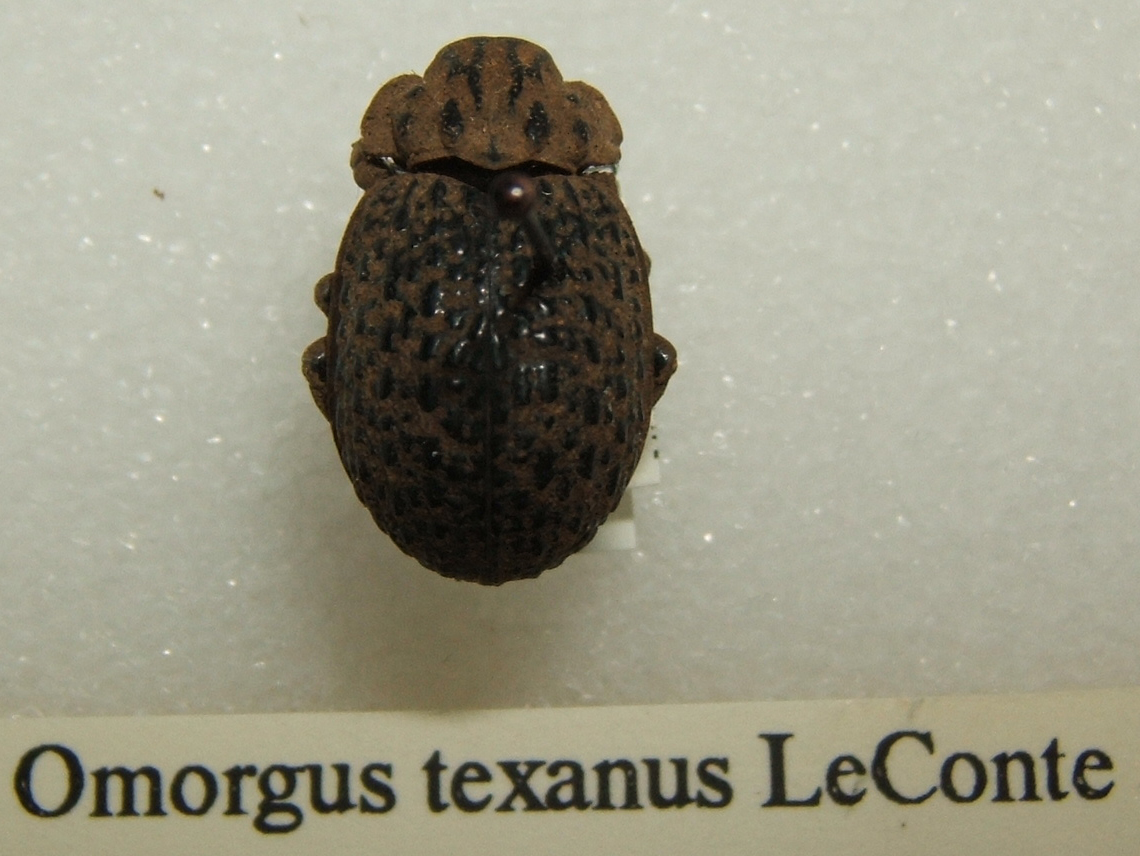
- Omorgus texanus, adult

Scientific classification
- Kingdom: Animalia
- Phylum: Arthropoda
- Class: Insecta
- Order: Coleoptera
- Suborder: Polyphaga
- Infraorder: Scarabaeiformia
- Family: Trogidae
- Genus: Omorgus
- Species: O. texanus

Binomial name
- Omorgus texanus LeConte, 1854

= Omorgus texanus =

Species of beetle

Omorgus texanus is a beetle of the family Trogidae.

== Gallery ==
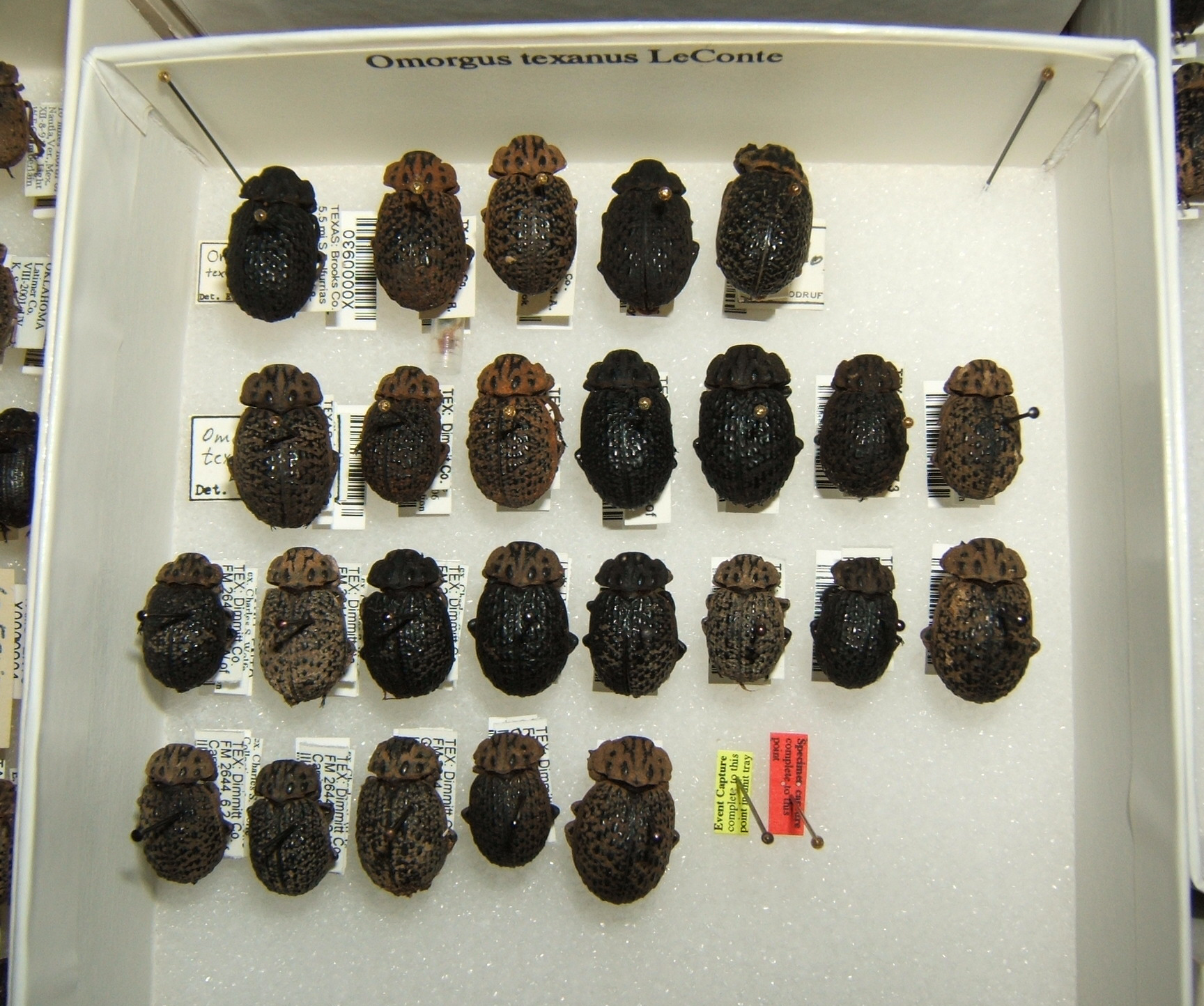
Omorgus texanus variation
