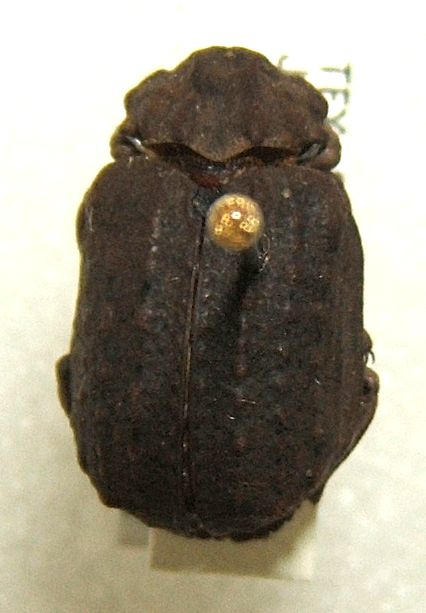
- Omorgus fuliginosus, adult

Scientific classification
- Kingdom: Animalia
- Phylum: Arthropoda
- Class: Insecta
- Order: Coleoptera
- Suborder: Polyphaga
- Infraorder: Scarabaeiformia
- Family: Trogidae
- Genus: Omorgus
- Species: O. fuliginosus

Binomial name
- Omorgus fuliginosus Robinson, 1941

Synonyms
- Trox (Omorgus) fuliginosus Robinson, 1941; Omorgus capillaceus Scholtz, 1990

= Omorgus fuliginosus =

Species of beetle

Omorgus fuliginosus is a beetle of the family Trogidae. It occurs in North and Central America with records from Texas (USA), Mexico, El Salvador, and Costa Rica.

Omorgus fuliginosus measure 13–15 mm (0.51–0.59 in).

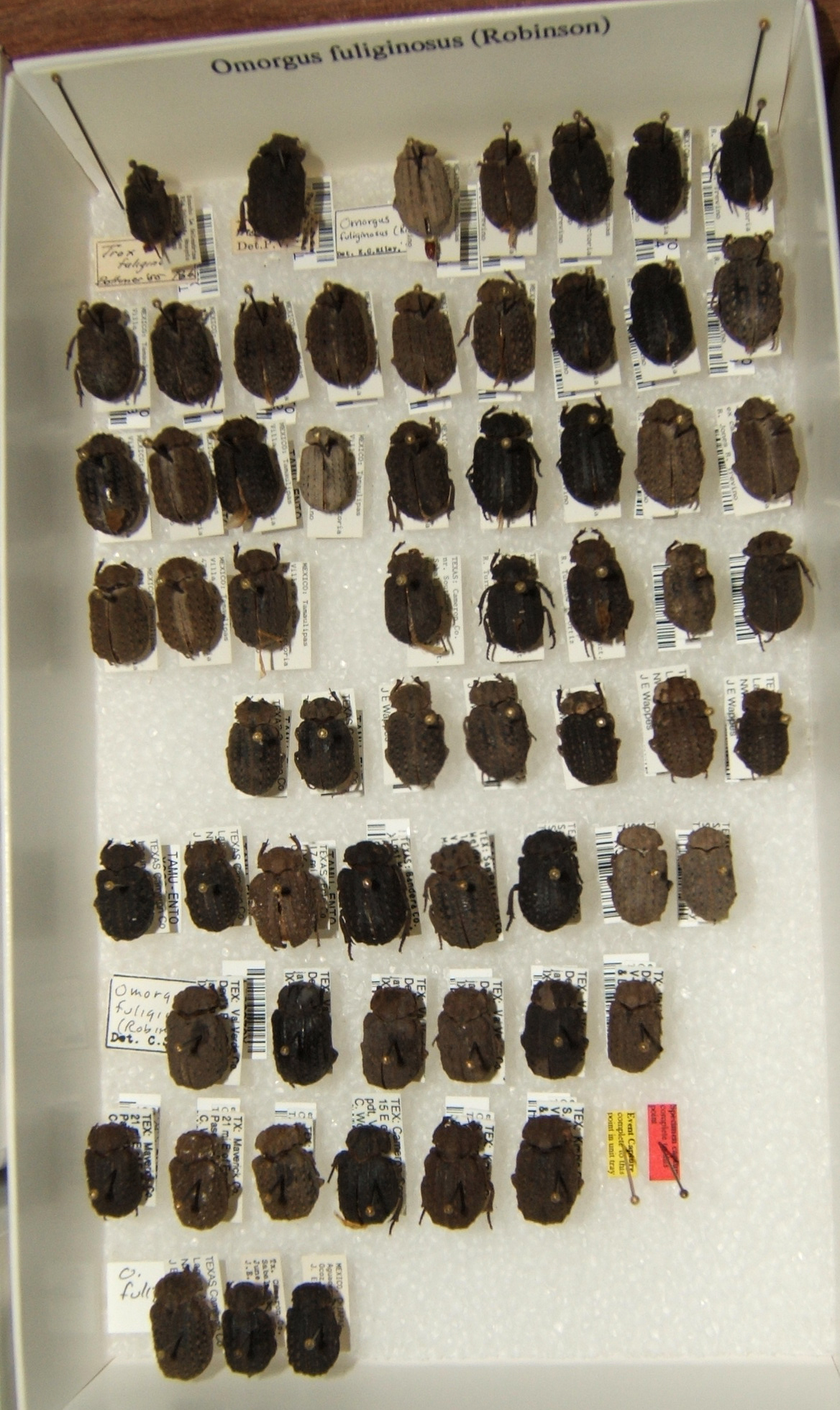
Omorgus fuliginosus variation
