= Omorgus monteithi =

Scientific classification
- Kingdom: Animalia
- Phylum: Arthropoda
- Class: Insecta
- Order: Coleoptera
- Suborder: Polyphaga
- Infraorder: Scarabaeiformia
- Family: Trogidae
- Genus: Omorgus
- Species: O. monteithi

Binomial name
- Omorgus monteithi (Scholtz, 1986)

Synonyms
- Trox monteithi Scholtz, 1986

Species of beetle

Omorgus monteithi is a species of hide beetle in the subfamily Omorginae.
