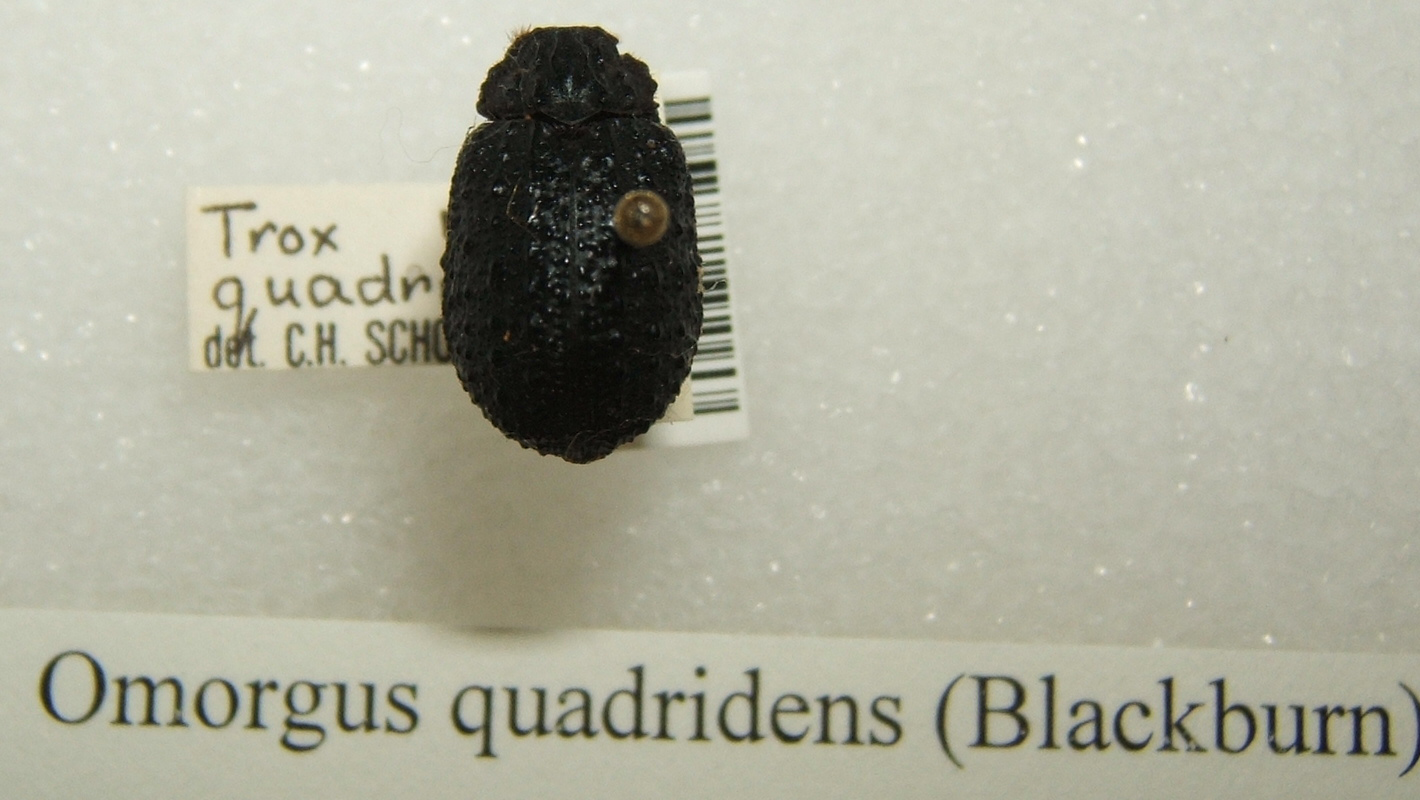
- Omorgus quadridens, adult

Scientific classification
- Kingdom: Animalia
- Phylum: Arthropoda
- Class: Insecta
- Order: Coleoptera
- Suborder: Polyphaga
- Infraorder: Scarabaeiformia
- Family: Trogidae
- Genus: Omorgus
- Species: O. quadridens

Binomial name
- Omorgus quadridens (Blackburn, 1892)

= Omorgus quadridens =

Species of beetle

Omorgus quadridens is a beetle of the family Trogidae.
