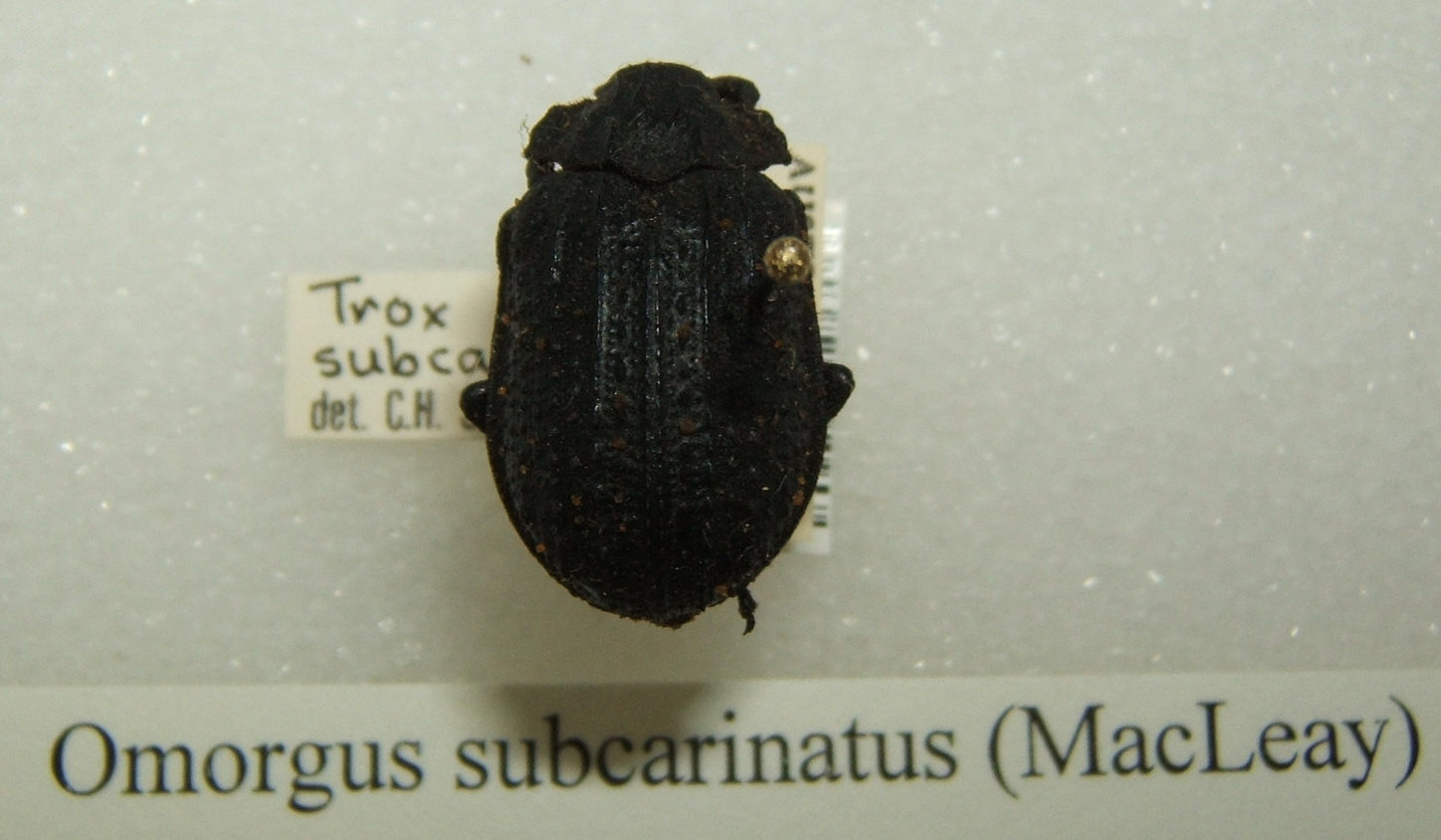
- Omorgus subcarinatus, adult

Scientific classification
- Kingdom: Animalia
- Phylum: Arthropoda
- Class: Insecta
- Order: Coleoptera
- Suborder: Polyphaga
- Infraorder: Scarabaeiformia
- Family: Trogidae
- Genus: Omorgus
- Species: O. subcarinatus

Binomial name
- Omorgus subcarinatus (MacLeay, 1864)

= Omorgus subcarinatus =

Species of beetle

Omorgus subcarinatus is a beetle of the family Trogidae. It is found in Australia.
