= Omorgus pastillarius =

Scientific classification
- Kingdom: Animalia
- Phylum: Arthropoda
- Class: Insecta
- Order: Coleoptera
- Suborder: Polyphaga
- Infraorder: Scarabaeiformia
- Family: Trogidae
- Genus: Omorgus
- Species: O. pastillarius

Binomial name
- Omorgus pastillarius (Blanchard, 1846)

Synonyms
- Trox pastillarius Blanchard, 1846

Species of beetle

Omorgus pastillarius is a species of hide beetle in the subfamily Omorginae.
