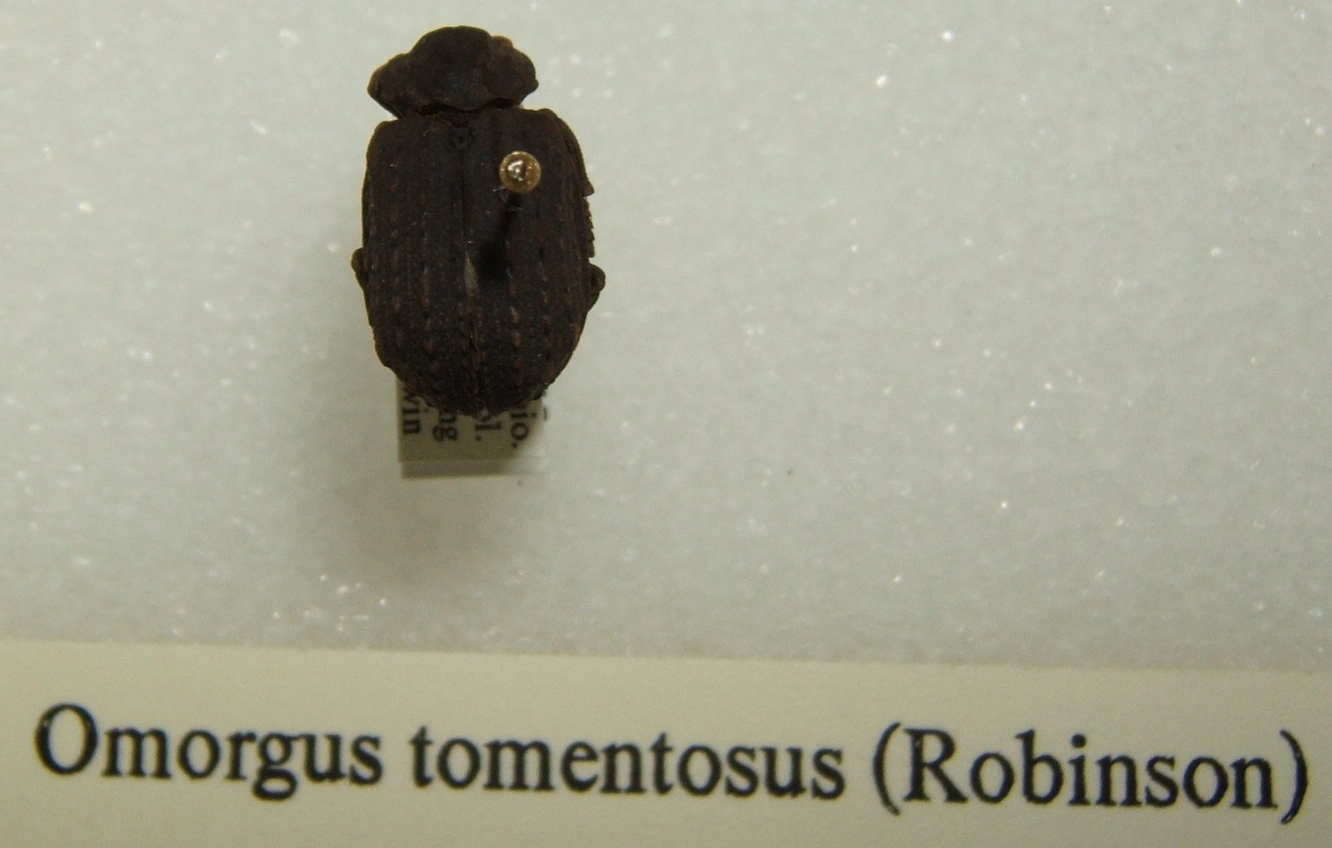
- Omorgus tomentosus, adult

Scientific classification
- Kingdom: Animalia
- Phylum: Arthropoda
- Class: Insecta
- Order: Coleoptera
- Suborder: Polyphaga
- Infraorder: Scarabaeiformia
- Family: Trogidae
- Genus: Omorgus
- Species: O. tomentosus

Binomial name
- Omorgus tomentosus (Robinson, 1941)

= Omorgus tomentosus =

Species of beetle

Omorgus tomentosus is a beetle of the family Trogidae.

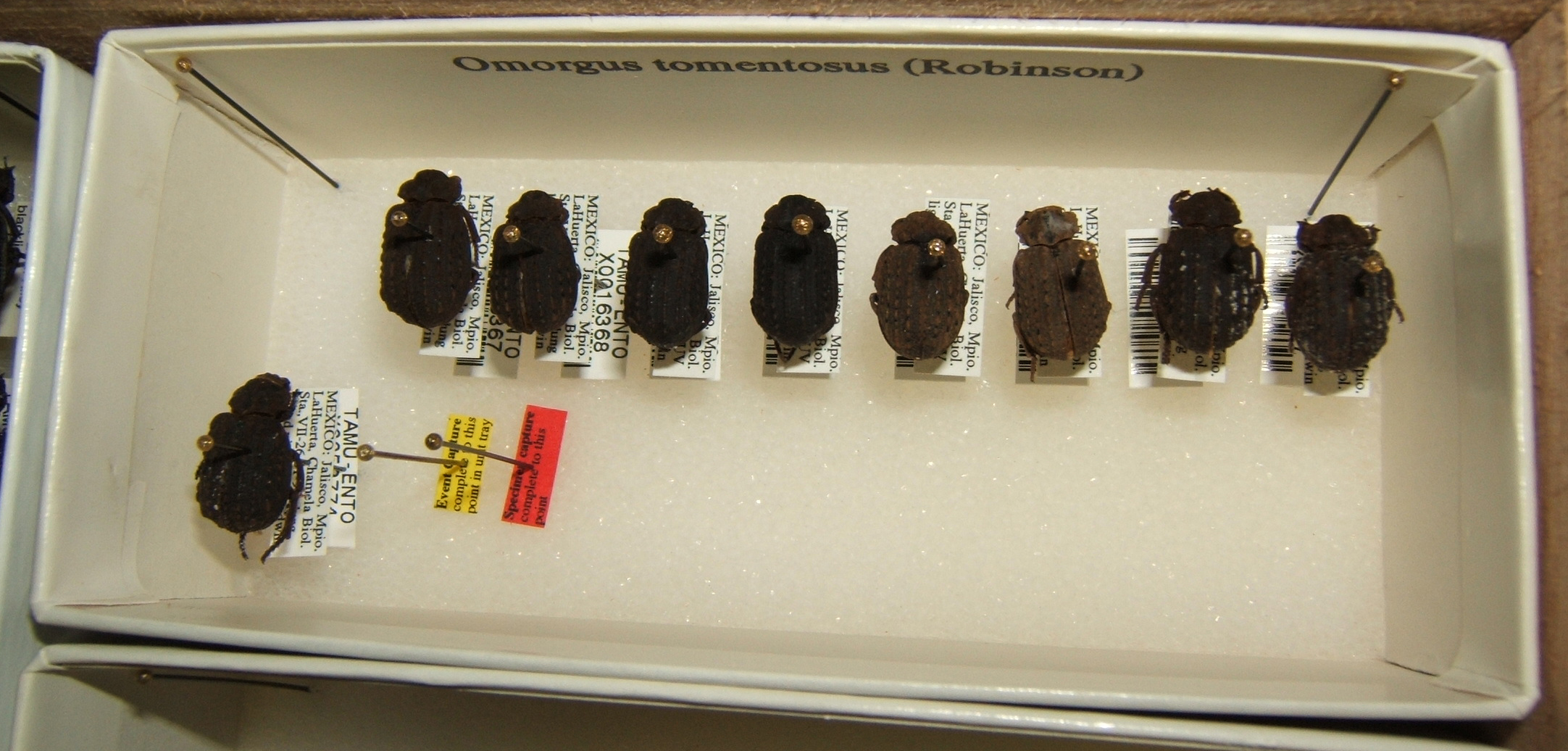
Omorgus tomentosus variation
