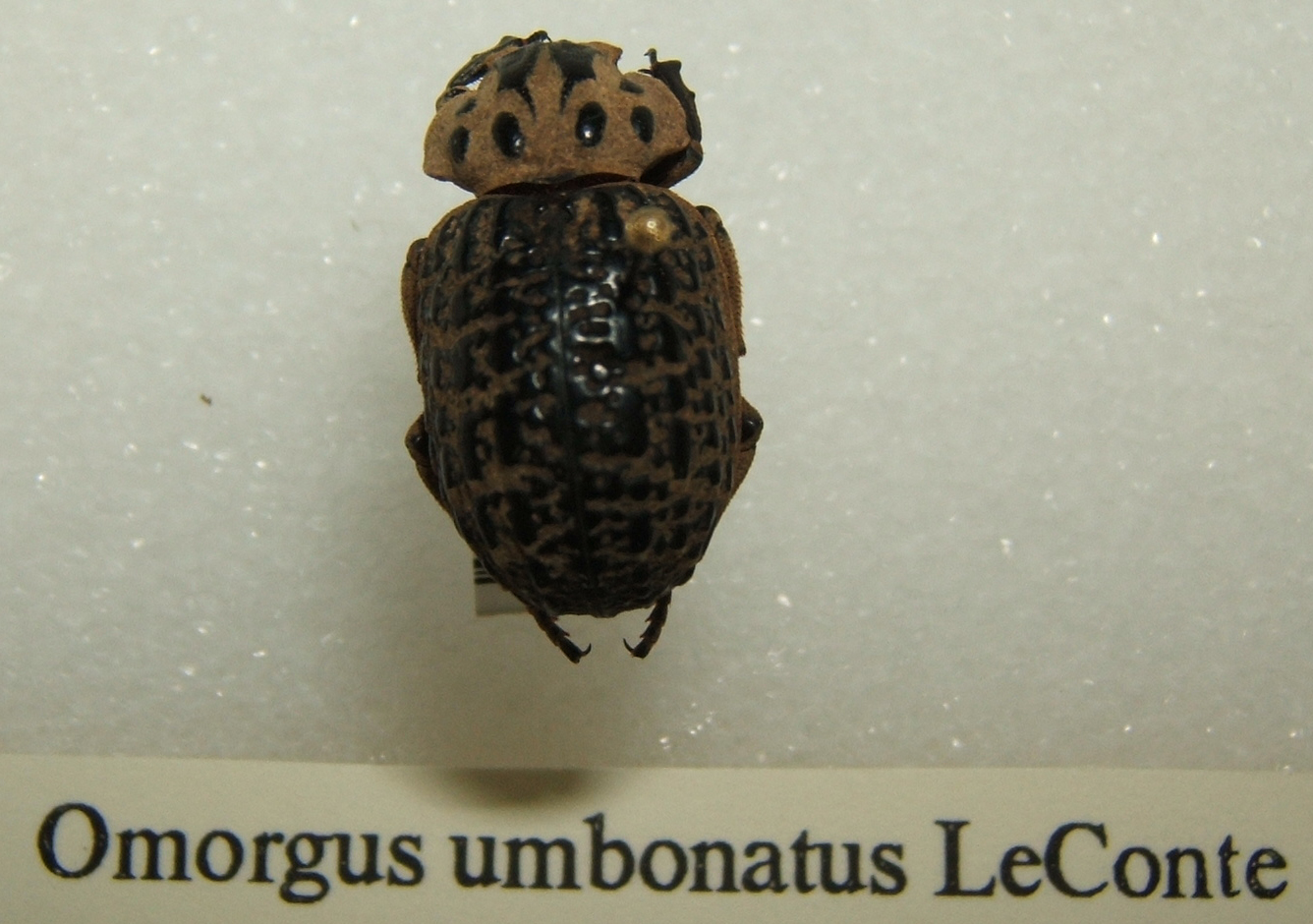
- Omorgus umbonatus, adult

Scientific classification
- Kingdom: Animalia
- Phylum: Arthropoda
- Class: Insecta
- Order: Coleoptera
- Suborder: Polyphaga
- Infraorder: Scarabaeiformia
- Family: Trogidae
- Genus: Omorgus
- Species: O. umbonatus

Binomial name
- Omorgus umbonatus LeConte, 1854

= Omorgus umbonatus =

Species of beetle

Omorgus umbonatus is a beetle of the family Trogidae.

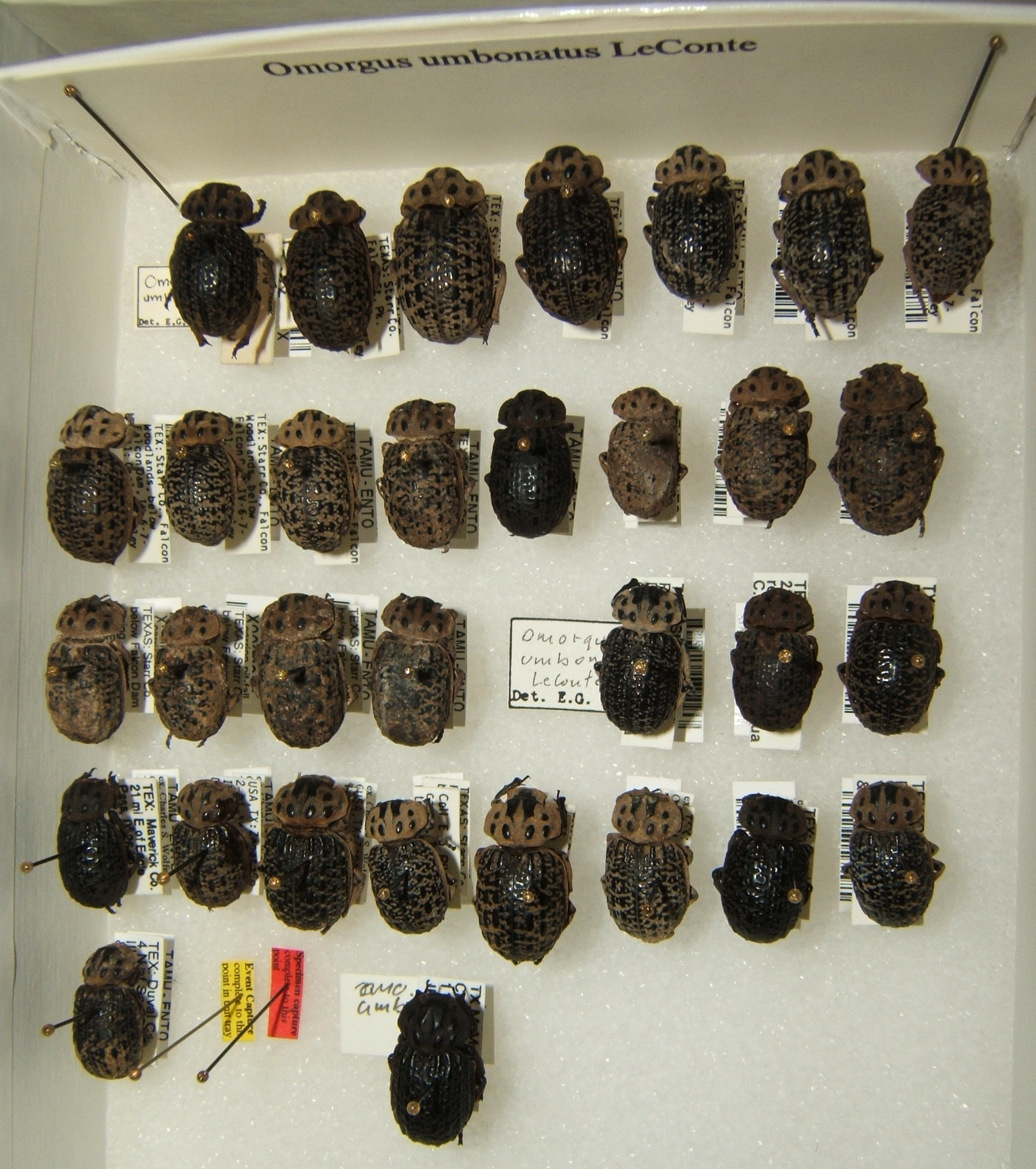
Omorgus umbonatus variation
