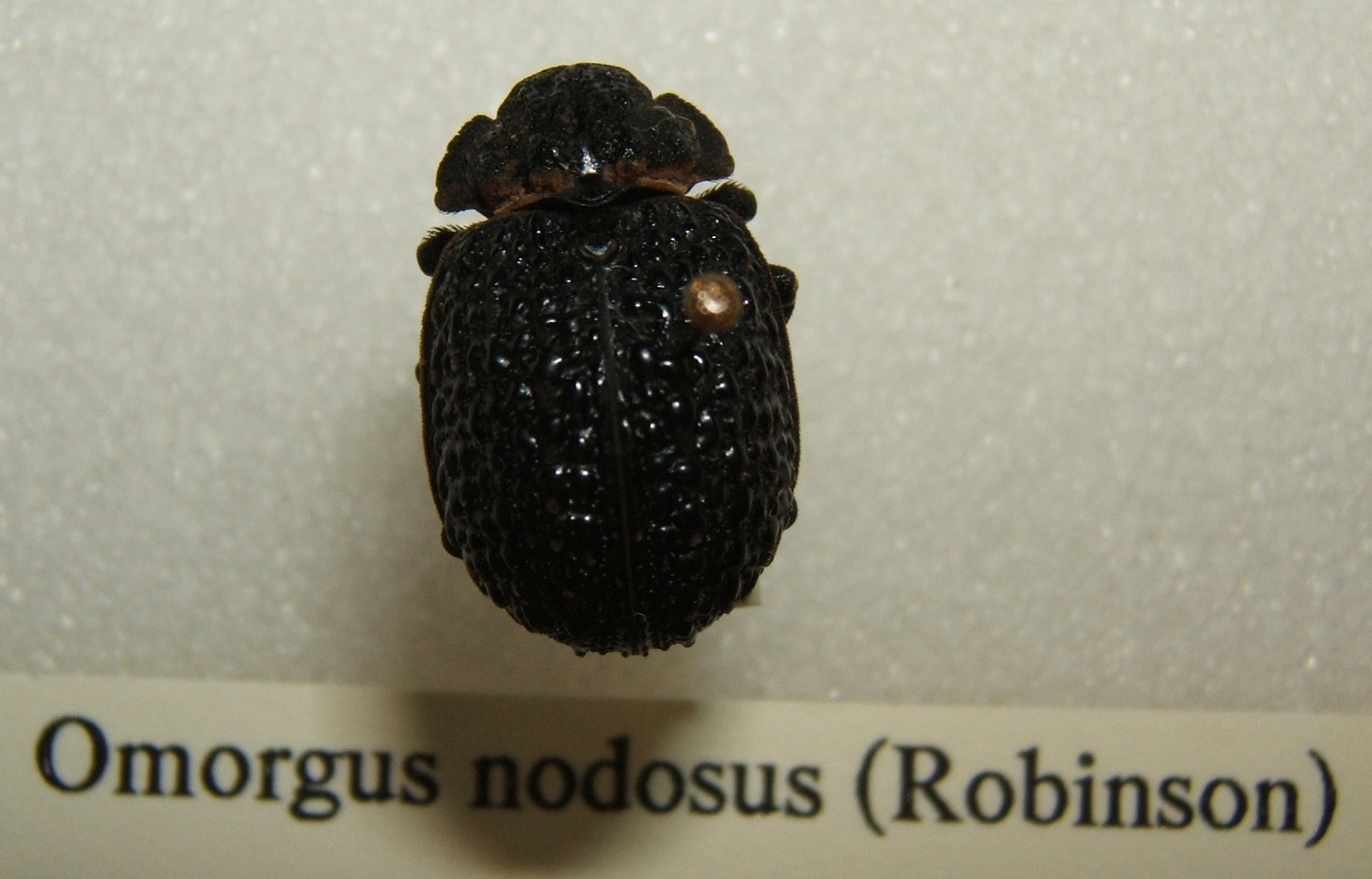
- Omorgus nodosus, adult

Scientific classification
- Kingdom: Animalia
- Phylum: Arthropoda
- Class: Insecta
- Order: Coleoptera
- Suborder: Polyphaga
- Infraorder: Scarabaeiformia
- Family: Trogidae
- Genus: Omorgus
- Species: O. nodosus

Binomial name
- Omorgus nodosus (Robinson, 1940)

= Omorgus nodosus =

Species of beetle

Omorgus nodosus is a beetle of the family Trogidae.

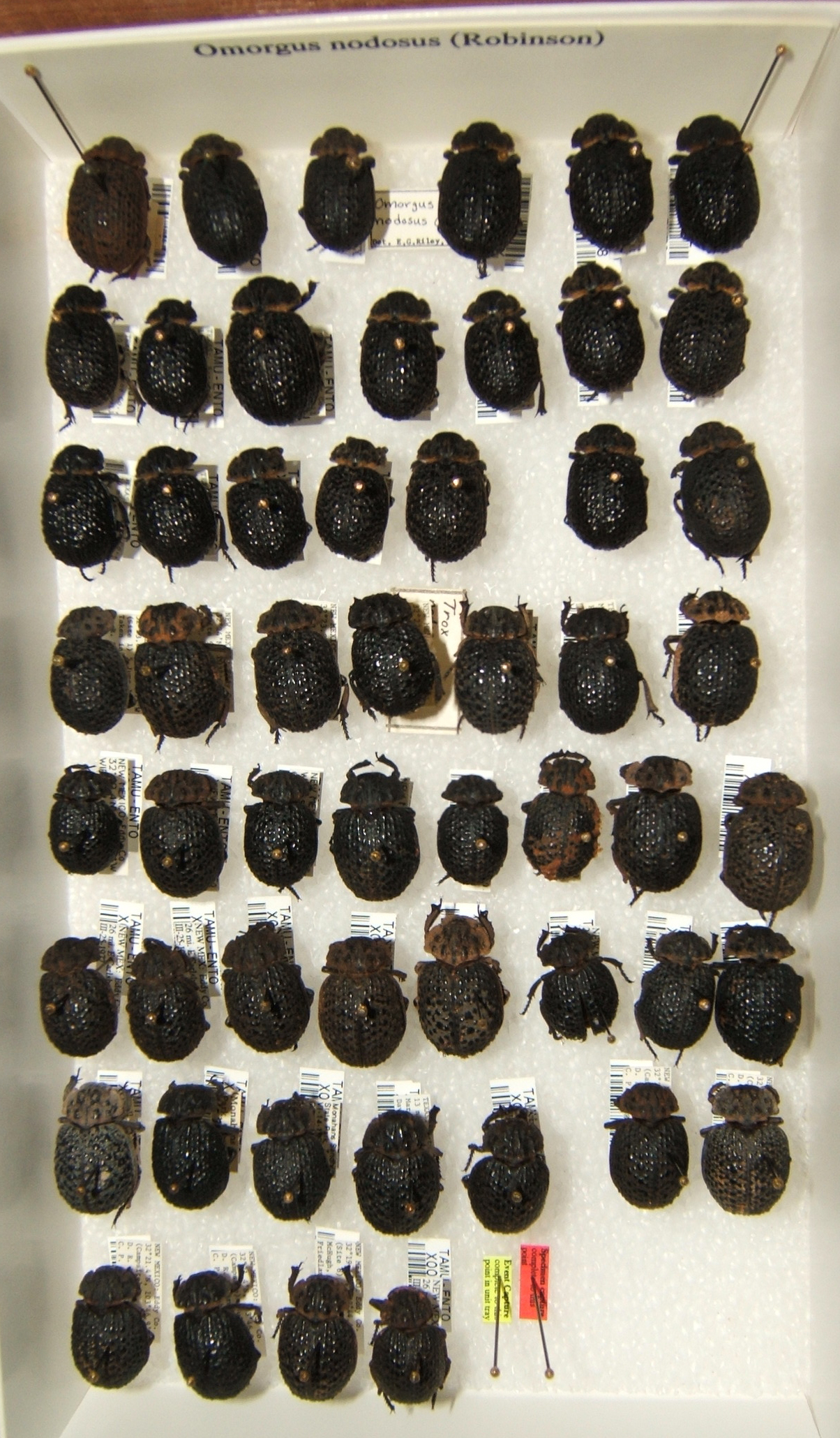
Omorgus nodosus variation
