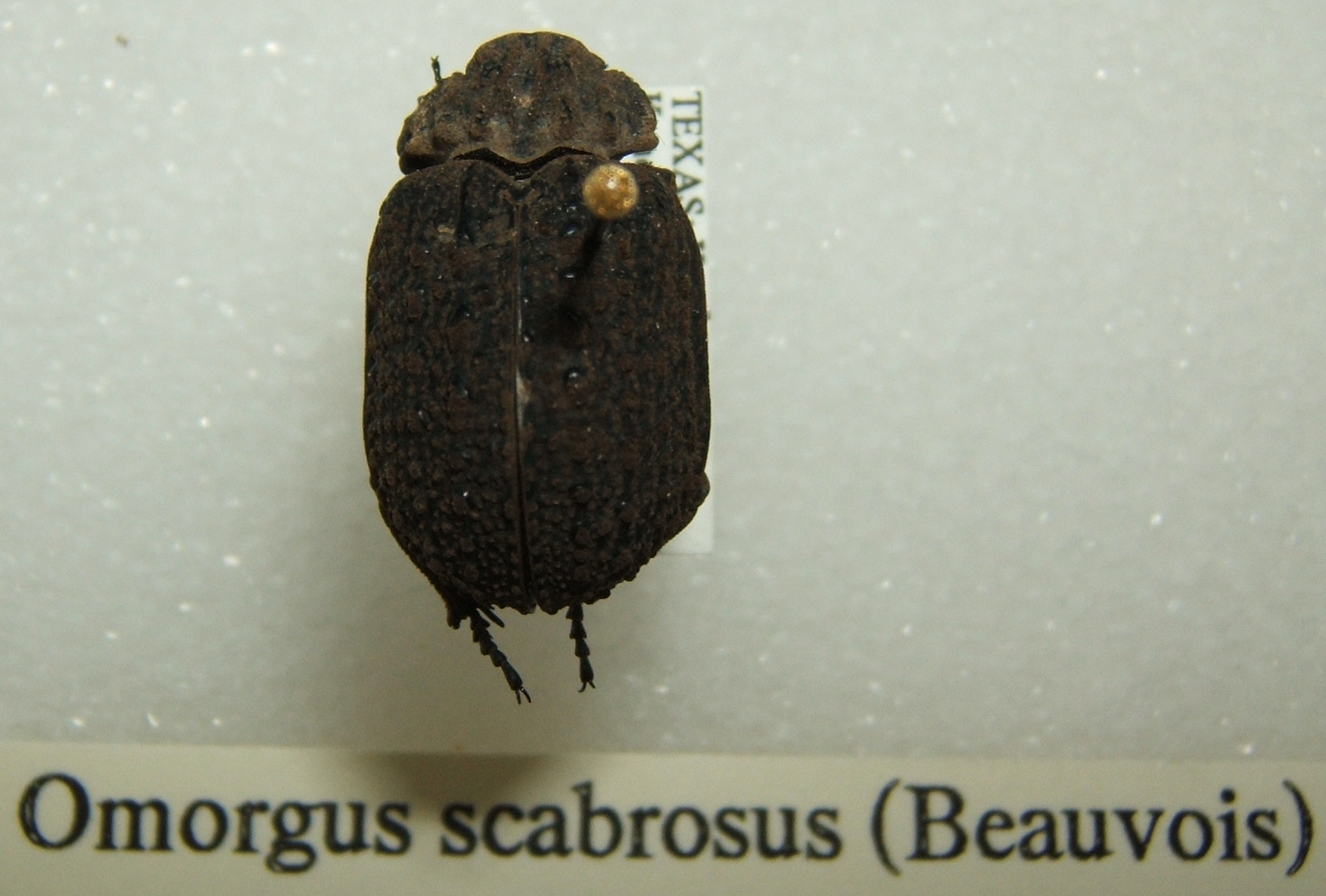
- Omorgus scabrosus, adult

Scientific classification
- Kingdom: Animalia
- Phylum: Arthropoda
- Clade: Pancrustacea
- Class: Insecta
- Order: Coleoptera
- Suborder: Polyphaga
- Infraorder: Scarabaeiformia
- Family: Trogidae
- Genus: Omorgus
- Species: O. scabrosus

Binomial name
- Omorgus scabrosus (Beauvois, 1818)

= Omorgus scabrosus =

Species of beetle

Omorgus scabrosus is a beetle of the family Trogidae. It is found in the United States and Canada.
