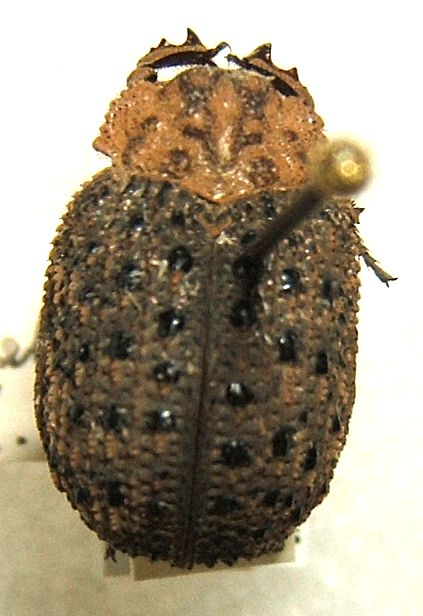
- Omorgus granulatus

Scientific classification
- Kingdom: Animalia
- Phylum: Arthropoda
- Class: Insecta
- Order: Coleoptera
- Suborder: Polyphaga
- Infraorder: Scarabaeiformia
- Family: Trogidae
- Subfamily: Omorginae
- Genus: Omorgus; Erichson, 1847

= Omorgus =

Genus of beetles

Omorgus is a genus of beetles of the family Trogidae with about 140 species worldwide. Omorgus beetles are generally between 9 and 20 mm long.

== Taxonomy ==
Omorgus has three subgenera, Omorgus (Omorgus), Omorgus (Afromorgus), and Omorgus (Haroldomorgus), with the following species:

Subgenus Omorgus

- Omorgus alatus (Macleay, 1888)
- Omorgus alius (Scholtz, 1986)
- Omorgus alternans (W.S. Macleay, 1826)
- Omorgus amictus (Haaf, 1954)
- Omorgus aphanocephalus (Scholtz, 1986)
- Omorgus asper LeConte, 1854
- Omorgus augustae (Blackburn, 1892)
- Omorgus australasiae (Erichson, 1842)
- Omorgus badeni (Harold, 1872)
- Omorgus borrei (Harold, 1872)
- Omorgus brucki (Harold, 1872)
- Omorgus candezei (Harold, 1872)
- Omorgus candidus (Harold, 1872)
- Omorgus capillamentis Strümpher & Scholtz, 2011
- Omorgus carinatus (Loomis, 1922)
- Omorgus carinicollis (Scholtz, 1986)
- Omorgus ciliatus (Blanchard, 1846)
- Omorgus costatus (Wiedemann, 1823)
- Omorgus crotchi (Harold, 1871)
- Omorgus curvipes (Harold, 1872)
- Omorgus demarzi (Haaf, 1958)
- Omorgus dohrni (Harold, 1871)
- Omorgus elderi (Blackburn, 1892)
- Omorgus elongatus (Haaf, 1954)
- Omorgus euclensis (Blackburn, 1892)
- Omorgus eyrensis (Blackburn, 1904)
- Omorgus fuliginosus (Robinson, 1941)
- Omorgus gigas (Harold, 1872)
- Omorgus granuliceps (Haaf, 1954)
- Omorgus howdenorum (Scholtz, 1986)
- Omorgus howelli (Howden & Vaurie, 1957)
- Omorgus indigenus Scholtz, 1990
- Omorgus inflatus (Loomis, 1922)
- Omorgus insignicollis (Blackburn, 1896)
- Omorgus loxus (Vaurie, 1955)
- Omorgus lucidus Pittino, 2010
- Omorgus mariae (Scholtz, 1986)
- Omorgus mariettae (Scholtz, 1986)
- Omorgus marshalli (Haaf, 1957)
- Omorgus mentitor (Blackburn, 1896)
- Omorgus mictlensis Deloya, 1995
- Omorgus monachus (Herbst, 1790)
- Omorgus monteithi (Scholtz, 1986)
- Omorgus nanningensis Pittino, 2005
- Omorgus nigroscobinus (Scholtz, 1986)
- Omorgus nocheles Scholtz, 1990
- Omorgus nodicollis (Macleay, 1888)
- Omorgus nodosus (Robinson, 1940)
- Omorgus ovalis (Haaf, 1957)
- Omorgus pampeanus (Burmeister, 1876)
- Omorgus parvicollis (Scholtz, 1986)
- Omorgus pastillarius (Blanchard, 1846)
- Omorgus pellosomus (Scholtz, 1986)
- Omorgus perhispidus (Blackburn, 1904)
- Omorgus persuberosus (Vaurie, 1962)
- Omorgus punctatus (Germar, 1824)
- Omorgus quadridens (Blackburn, 1892)
- Omorgus quadrinodosus (Haaf, 1954)
- Omorgus regalis (Haaf, 1954)
- Omorgus rodriguezae Deloya, 2005
- Omorgus rotundulus (Haaf, 1957)
- Omorgus rubricans (Robinson, 1946)
- Omorgus salebrosus (Macleay, 1871)
- Omorgus scabrosus (Palisot de Beauvois, 1818)
- Omorgus scutellaris (Say, 1824)
- Omorgus semicostatus (Macleay, 1871)
- Omorgus setosipennis (Blackburn, 1904)
- Omorgus spatulatus (Vaurie, 1962)
- Omorgus squamosus (Macleay, 1871)
- Omorgus stellatus (Harold, 1872)
- Omorgus strzeleckensis (Blackburn, 1895)
- Omorgus subcarinatus (MacLeay, 1864)
- Omorgus suberosus (Fabricius, 1775)
- Omorgus tasmanicus (Blackburn, 1904)
- Omorgus tatei (Blackburn, 1892)
- Omorgus tessellatus LeConte, 1854
- Omorgus texanus LeConte, 1854
- Omorgus tomentosus (Robinson, 1941)
- Omorgus triestinae Pittino, 1987
- Omorgus trilobus (Haaf, 1954)
- Omorgus tytus (Robinson, 1941)
- Omorgus umbonatus LeConte, 1854
- Omorgus undaraensis Strümpher et al., 2014
- Omorgus villosus (Haaf, 1954)
- Omorgus vladislavi Kawai, 2009

Subgenus Afromorgus

- Omorgus acinus Scholtz, 1980
- Omorgus amitinus (Kolbe, 1904)
- Omorgus asperulatus (Harold, 1872)
- Omorgus baccatus (Gerstaecker, 1867)
- Omorgus batesi (Harold, 1872)
- Omorgus bayoni (Pittino, 2011)
- Omorgus benadirensis (Pittino, 2011)
- Omorgus birmanicus (Arrow, 1927)
- Omorgus borgognoi (Marchand, 1902)
- Omorgus chinensis (Boheman, 1858)
- Omorgus consanguineus (Péringuey, 1901)
- Omorgus denticulatus (Olivier, 1789)
- Omorgus discedens (Haaf, 1954)
- Omorgus drumonti (Pittino, 2011)
- Omorgus elevatus (Harold, 1872)
- Omorgus endroedyi (Scholtz, 1979)
- Omorgus expansus (Arrow, 1900)
- Omorgus fenestrellus (Balthasar, 1939)
- Omorgus foveolatus (Boheman, 1860)
- Omorgus frater (Pittino, 2005)
- Omorgus freyi (Haaf, 1954)
- Omorgus funestus (Lansberge, 1886)
- Omorgus gemmatus (Olivier, 1789)
- Omorgus genieri Scholtz, 1991
- Omorgus granulatus (Herbst, 1783)
- Omorgus guttalis (Haaf, 1954)
- Omorgus haagi (Harold, 1872)
- Omorgus inclusus (Walker, 1858)
- Omorgus indicus (Harold, 1872)
- Omorgus inermis (Pittino, 2005)
- Omorgus insignis (Haaf, 1954)
- Omorgus italicus (Reiche, 1853)
- Omorgus lindemannae (Petrovitz, 1975)
- Omorgus lobicollis (Arrow, 1927)
- Omorgus lugubris (Haaf, 1954)
- Omorgus maindroni (Pittino, 2005)
- Omorgus maissouri (Haaf, 1954)
- Omorgus melancholicus (Fahraeus, 1857)
- Omorgus mollis (Arrow, 1927)
- Omorgus mutabilis (Haaf, 1954)
- Omorgus niloticus (Harold, 1872)
- Omorgus obesus (Scholtz, 1980)
- Omorgus omacanthus (Harold, 1872)
- Omorgus pauliani (Haaf, 1954)
- Omorgus ponderosus (Péringuey, 1901)
- Omorgus principalis (Haaf, 1954)
- Omorgus procerus (Harold, 1872)
- Omorgus radula (Erichson, 1843)
- Omorgus reiterorum (Kral & Kuban, 2012)
- Omorgus rimulosus (Haaf, 1957)
- Omorgus rusticus (Fåhraeus, 1857)
- Omorgus satorui Kawai, 2006
- Omorgus senegalensis (Scholtz, 1983)
- Omorgus squalidus (Olivier, 1789)
- Omorgus testudo (Arrow, 1927)
- Omorgus tuberosus Klug, 1855
- Omorgus unguicularis (Haaf, 1954)
- Omorgus varicosus (Erichson, 1843)
- Omorgus verrucosus (Reiche, 1856)
- Omorgus wittei (Haaf, 1955)
- Omorgus zumpti (Haaf, 1957)
