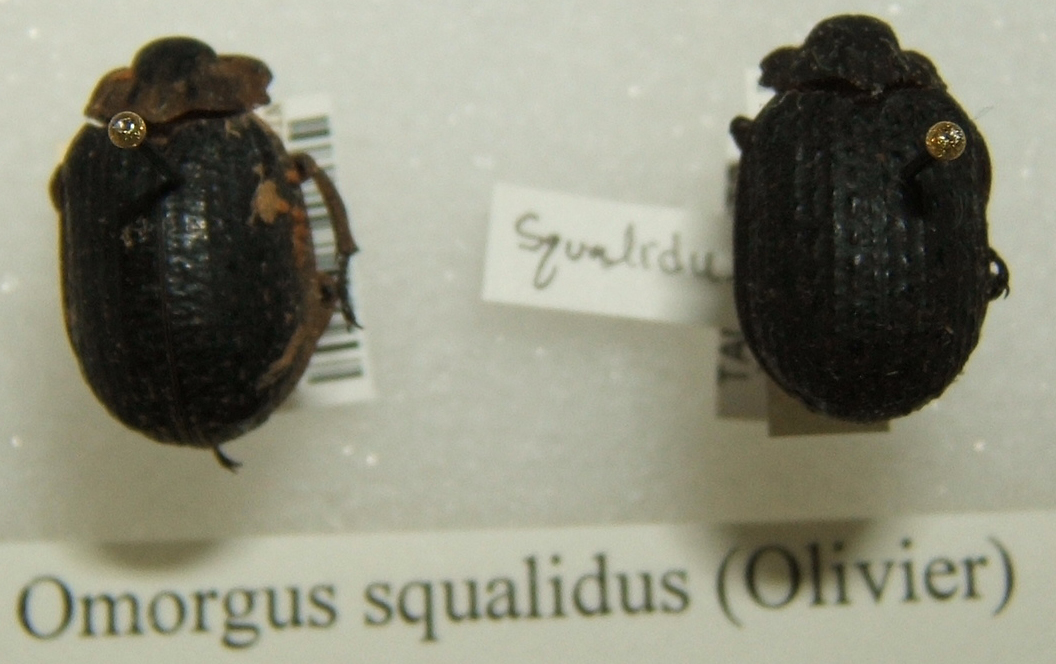
- Omorgus squalidus, adult

Scientific classification
- Kingdom: Animalia
- Phylum: Arthropoda
- Clade: Pancrustacea
- Class: Insecta
- Order: Coleoptera
- Suborder: Polyphaga
- Infraorder: Scarabaeiformia
- Family: Trogidae
- Genus: Omorgus
- Species: O. squalidus

Binomial name
- Omorgus squalidus (Olivier, 1789)

= Omorgus squalidus =

Species of beetle

Omorgus squalidus is a beetle of the family Trogidae.
