= Omorgus gigas =

Scientific classification
- Kingdom: Animalia
- Phylum: Arthropoda
- Class: Insecta
- Order: Coleoptera
- Suborder: Polyphaga
- Infraorder: Scarabaeiformia
- Family: Trogidae
- Genus: Omorgus
- Species: O. gigas

Binomial name
- Omorgus gigas Harold, 1872

Species of beetle

Omorgus gigas is a species of hide beetle in the subfamily Omorginae.
