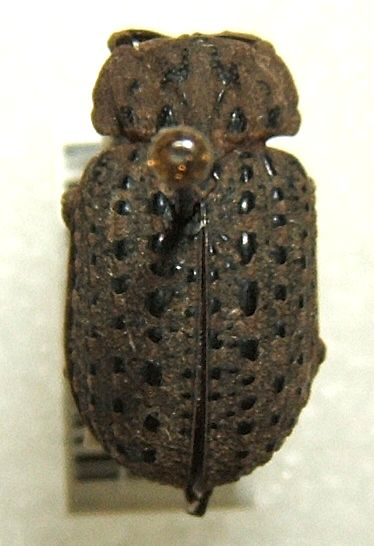
- Omorgus asper, adult

Scientific classification
- Kingdom: Animalia
- Phylum: Arthropoda
- Class: Insecta
- Order: Coleoptera
- Suborder: Polyphaga
- Infraorder: Scarabaeiformia
- Family: Trogidae
- Genus: Omorgus
- Species: O. asper

Binomial name
- Omorgus asper LeConte, 1854

= Omorgus asper =

Species of beetle

Omorgus asper is a beetle of the family Trogidae found in the United States and Mexico.

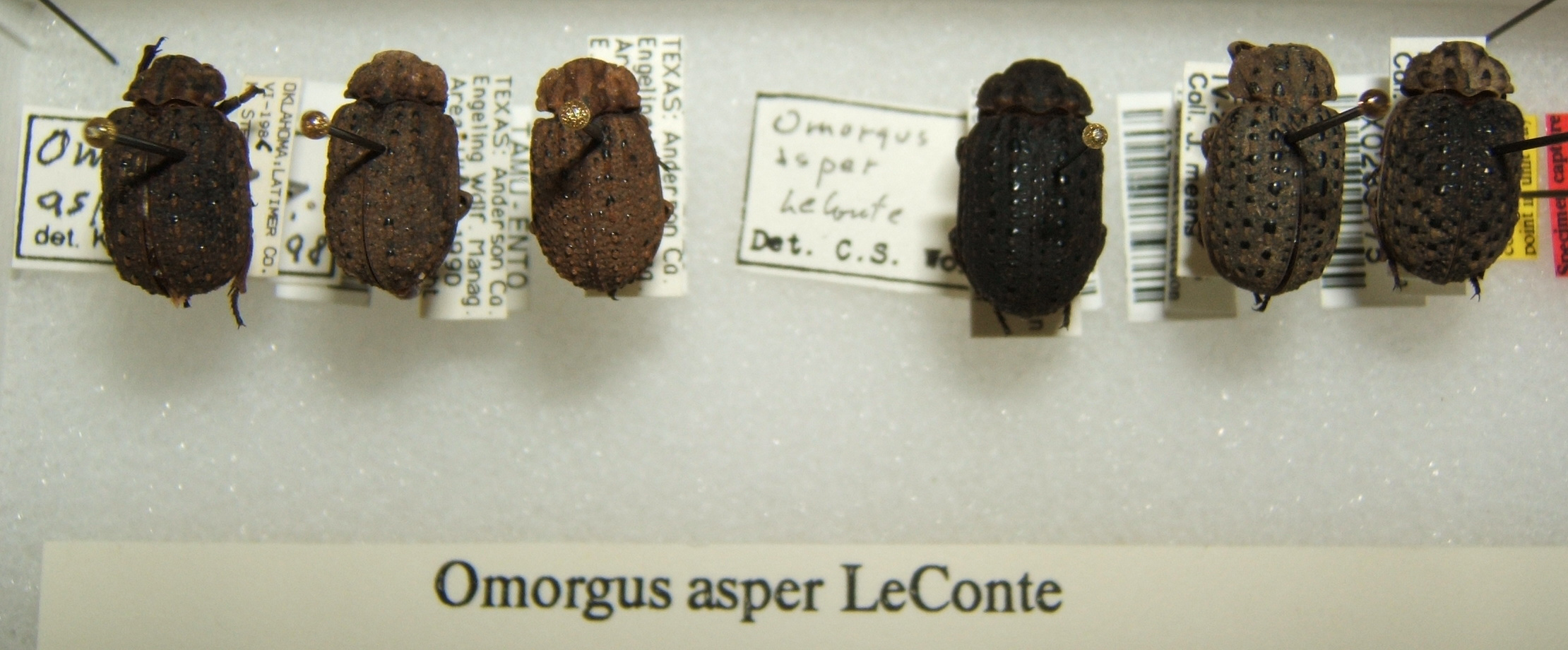
Omorgus asper variation
