= Omorgus indigenus =

Scientific classification
- Kingdom: Animalia
- Phylum: Arthropoda
- Class: Insecta
- Order: Coleoptera
- Suborder: Polyphaga
- Infraorder: Scarabaeiformia
- Family: Trogidae
- Genus: Omorgus
- Species: O. indigenus

Binomial name
- Omorgus indigenus Scholtz, 1990

Species of beetle

Omorgus indigenus is a species of hide beetle in the subfamily Omorginae.
