= Omorgus mictlensis =

Scientific classification
- Kingdom: Animalia
- Phylum: Arthropoda
- Class: Insecta
- Order: Coleoptera
- Suborder: Polyphaga
- Infraorder: Scarabaeiformia
- Family: Trogidae
- Genus: Omorgus
- Species: O. mictlensis

Binomial name
- Omorgus mictlensis Deloya, 1995

Species of beetle

Omorgus mictlensis is a species of hide beetle in the subfamily Omorginae.
