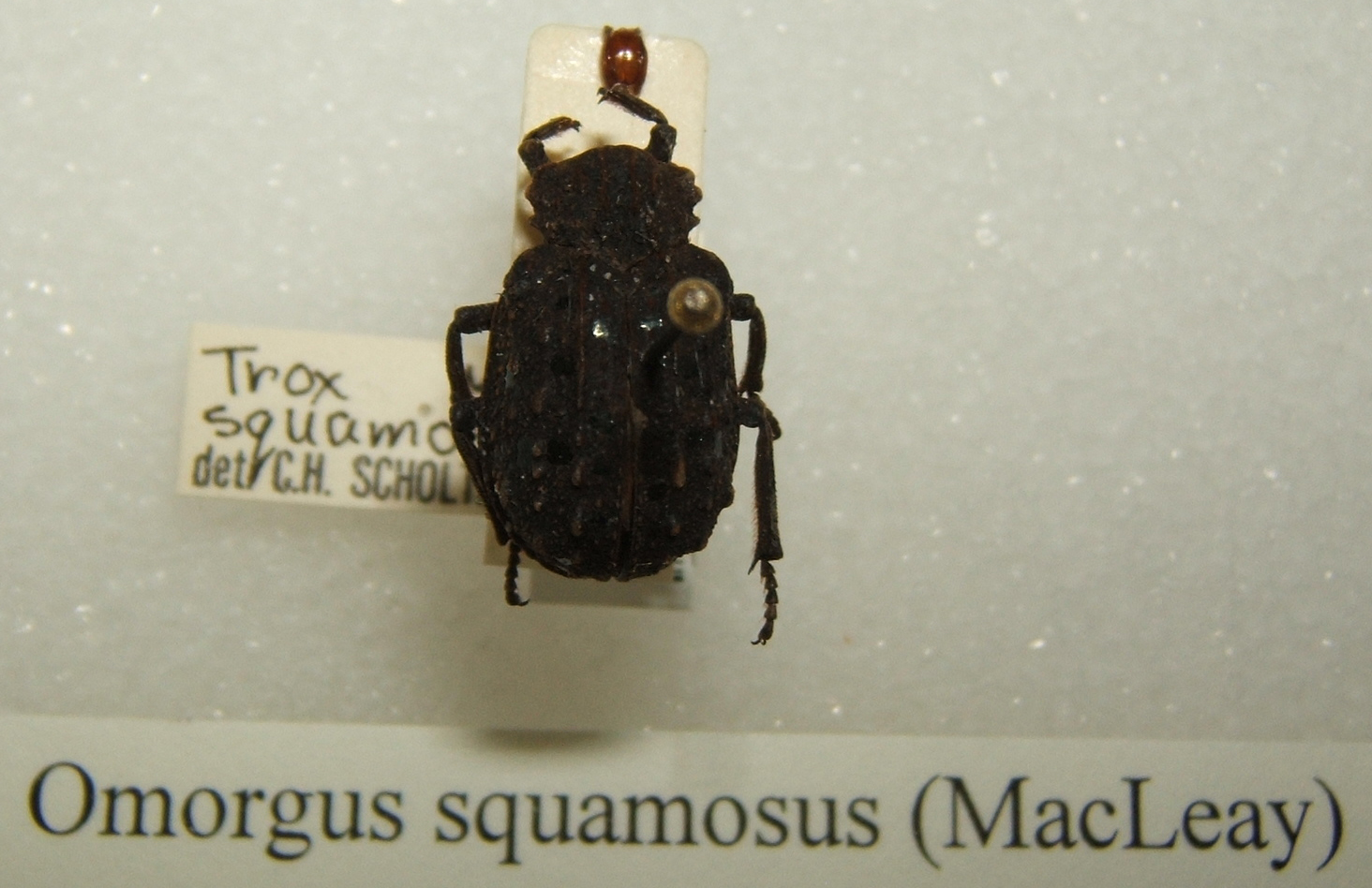
- Omorgus squamosus, adult

Scientific classification
- Kingdom: Animalia
- Phylum: Arthropoda
- Class: Insecta
- Order: Coleoptera
- Suborder: Polyphaga
- Infraorder: Scarabaeiformia
- Family: Trogidae
- Genus: Omorgus
- Species: O. squamosus

Binomial name
- Omorgus squamosus (MacLeay, 1872)

= Omorgus squamosus =

Species of beetle

Omorgus squamosus is a beetle of the family Trogidae.
