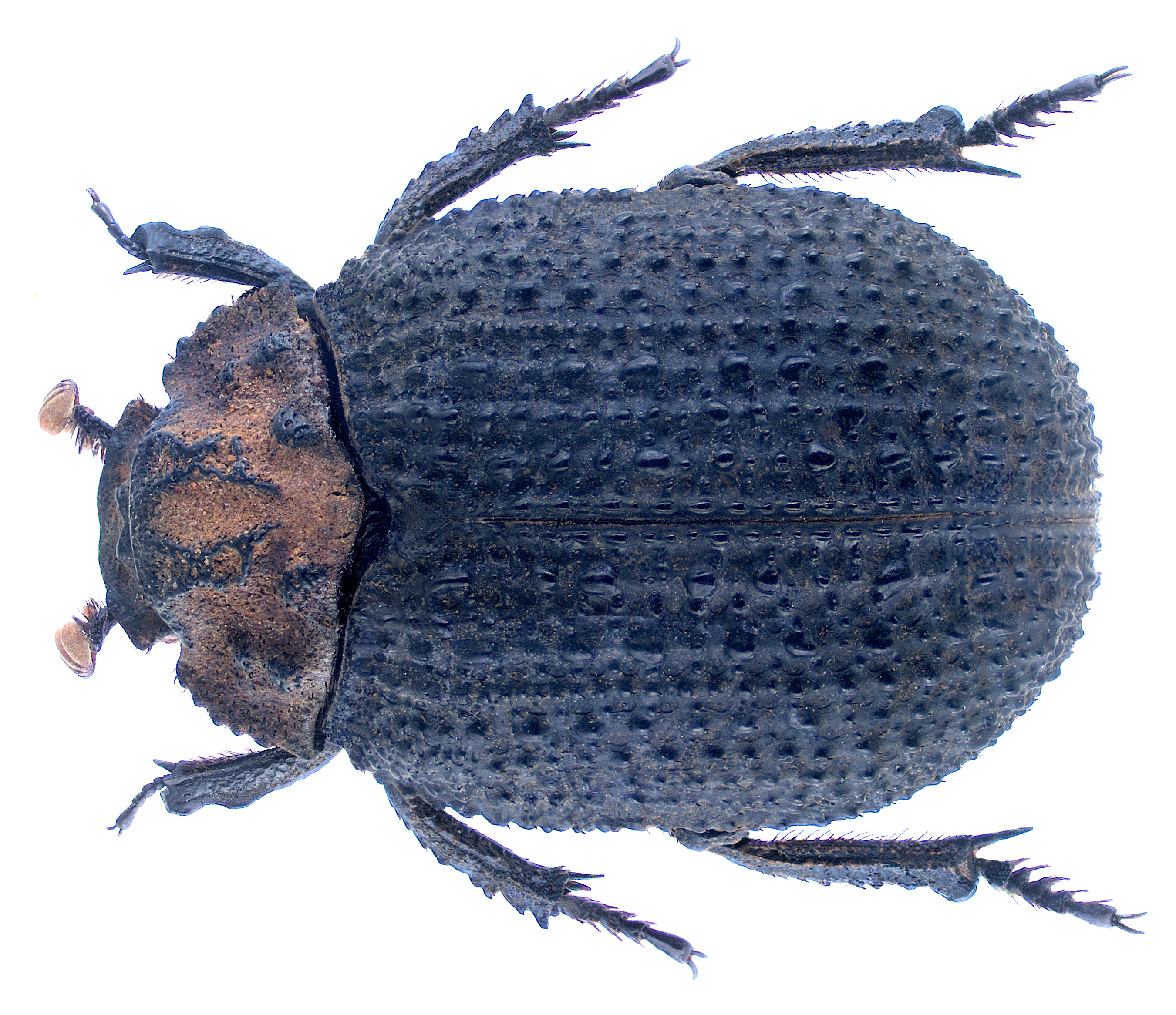
- Omorgus asperulatus

Scientific classification
- Kingdom: Animalia
- Phylum: Arthropoda
- Clade: Pancrustacea
- Class: Insecta
- Order: Coleoptera
- Suborder: Polyphaga
- Infraorder: Scarabaeiformia
- Family: Trogidae
- Genus: Omorgus
- Species: O. asperulatus

Binomial name
- Omorgus asperulatus Harold, 1872

= Omorgus asperulatus =

Species of beetle

Omorgus asperulatus is a species of hide beetle in the subfamily Omorginae and subgenus Afromorgus.
