= Erica atrovinosa =

Scientific classification
- Kingdom: Plantae
- Clade: Tracheophytes
- Clade: Angiosperms
- Clade: Eudicots
- Clade: Asterids
- Order: Ericales
- Family: Ericaceae
- Genus: Erica
- Species: E. atrovinosa

Binomial name
- Erica atrovinosa E.G.H.Oliv.

Species of flowering plant

Erica atrovinosa is a plant belonging to the genus Erica and forming part of the fynbos. The species is endemic to the Western Cape and occurs in the Hex River Mountains from Waaihoek to Milner Peak. It is estimated that there are less than 1 000 plants left. The habitat is threatened by excessive wildfires.
