= Phoberus disjunctus =

Scientific classification
- Domain: Eukaryota
- Kingdom: Animalia
- Phylum: Arthropoda
- Class: Insecta
- Order: Coleoptera
- Suborder: Polyphaga
- Infraorder: Scarabaeiformia
- Family: Trogidae
- Subfamily: Troginae
- Genus: Phoberus
- Species: P. disjunctus

Binomial name
- Phoberus disjunctus Strümpher, 2016

Species of beetle

Phoberus disjunctus is a species of hide beetle in the subfamily Troginae discovered by coleopterologist Werner P. Strümpher in 2016.

== Taxonomy ==
Initially, the scientific community treated all P. disjunctus specimens as part of the P. capensis species. These beetle specimen resided within the genus Trox. When Phoberus was recognized as a full genus, taxonomists moved P. capensis, and all P. disjunctus beetles along with it, from the genus Trox to the genus Phoberus. Recent evolutionary genetics allowed coleopterologist Strümpher and his team to uncover molecular and morphological differences between mainline P. capensis beetles and the P. disjunctus variant, causing the new Phoberus disjunctus species to be discovered and classified.

Within the genus Phoberus, P. disjunctus is most similar to P. capensis and P. herminae due to their shared evolutionary history, and historically researchers have often confused the three species for each other. P. disjunctus can be distinguished from the other two hide beetles by the shape of their pronota. Specifically, P. disjunctus has an evenly-rounded disc on the pronotum with a shallow depression running through its middle; by contrast, P. capensis and P. herminae have a high disc on the pronotum, whose margins spike out from the beetle's carapace, and a deep valley-like depression runs through their disc's middle.

== Morphology ==
Phoberus disjunctus is between 5 and 6 millimeters long and 3 and 4 millimeters wide. The hide beetle species has long parameres that are about two-thirds as long as their penis-like aedeagus.

== Distribution and diet ==
P. disjunctus lives within the South African province of Western Cape. Specifically, its geographical distribution follows the Cape Fold Mountains, a pattern of range seen across many beetle groups in South Africa. However, P. disjunctus survives best in mountainous ecosystems at high altitudes, and so its range is extremely scattered into a series of population islands along the Swartberg, Matroosberg, and Cederberg Mountains.

This ground-based beetle is a detritivore and survives by consuming keratin from animal feces and rotting meat.

== Evolutionary history ==
P. disjunctus, along with P. capensis and P. herminae, form the "capensis" node of the genus Phoberus. The three species all came from Phoberus capensis. At least four million years ago, P. capensis diverged from its closest relative outside the capensis node, P. nasutus. Then, sometime in the Pliocene or early Pleistocene, P. capensis diversified, with fragment populations splitting off and evolving into two new species. Rapid climate changes leading up to the ice ages likely prompted this evolution, as they affected hide beetle populations unequally. In most South African ecosystems, P. capensis populations plummeted. However, the Cape Fold Mountains contain a patchwork of forests, coastal plains, and mountain summits that are relatively cold, temperate, and much more stable than the surrounding ecosystems, serving as a buffer that shielded P. capensis populations within them. In the mountains, the ancestors of P. disjunctus were isolated from P. capensis groups that had taken refuge in other patchwork biomes, leading to allopatric speciation (evolution from geographic separation).
