= List of heritage sites in Worcester, Western Cape =

This is a list of the heritage sites in Worcester, Western Cape (Cape Winelands District Municipality) as recognised by the South African Heritage Resources Agency.

| SAHRA identifier | Site name | Description | Town | District | NHRA status | Coordinates | Image |
|---|---|---|---|---|---|---|---|
| 9/2/110/0001 | Olifantsberg, Worcester District | The original part of this Cape Dutch farmhouse consisted of a simple elongated dwelling and was erected in 1825 by Jacob de Vos. The building was later enlarged to its present H-shape. The front gable bears the date 1841 and the name J. de Vos. | | Worcester | Provincial Heritage Site | 33°13′40″S 21°51′25″E | Upload Photo |
| 9/2/110/0002 | 36 Russell Street, Worcester | Thatched 5-bay Cape Dutch house with mock-chimney end gable, attached to No. 38. Wide holbol gable with semicircular pediment and blocked-up window. 3 × 3 double door with geometric fanlight, c 1850 (F & C), 2 × 2 sashes. Full-length hipped verandah on p Type of site: House Current use: House. | Worcester | Worcester | Provincial Heritage Site | 33°38′42″S 19°26′52″E | Thatched 5-bay Cape Dutch house with mock-chimney end gable, attached to No. 38. Wide holbol gable with semicircular pediment and blocked-up window. 3 × 3 double door with geometric fanlight, c 1850 (F & C), 2 × 2 sashes. Full-length hipped verandah on p Type of site: House Current use: House. |
| 9/2/110/0003 | 31 Church Street, Worcester | | Worcester | Worcester | National Monument | | Upload Photo |
| 9/2/110/0004 | Erf 712, High Street, Worcester | | Worcester | Worcester | | 33°38′25″S 19°26′57″E | Upload Photo |
| 9/2/110/0005-002 | Hugo Naude House, 115 Russel Street, Worcester | This impressive dwelling, which was erected during the first decade of the twentieth century by Hugo Naudé, the well-known artist, as home and studio, is predominantly in the neo-Classical idiom. He lived here until his death on 5 April 1941. In particular Type of site: House Current use: House. | Worcester | Worcester | Provincial Heritage Site | 33°38′51″S 19°26′34″E | This impressive dwelling, which was erected during the first decade of the twentieth century by Hugo Naudé, the well-known artist, as home and studio, is predominantly in the neo-Classical idiom. He lived here until his death on 5 April 1941. In particular Type of site: House Current use: House. |
| 9/2/110/0006 | Kleinplasie, Show Grounds, Worcester | | Worcester | Worcester | Provincial Heritage Site | 33°38′42″S 19°26′37″E | |
| 9/2/110/0007 | Old Library, 101 High Street, Worcester | | Worcester | Worcester | National Monument | 33°38′44″S 19°26′34″E | Upload Photo |
| 9/2/110/0008 | Old Drostdy, Somerset Street, Worcester | The drostdy was the largest and most dignified building of its kind. It was built in the shape of a U, with two wings running back and enclosing an inner court. The style is described by Dr. Mary Cook as Cape-Georgian. "It shows", she writes, "most of the For a century the "Land of Waveren" formed a part of the district of Stellenbosch, until Commissioner De Mist cut off all the territory north of the Breede River and proclaimed it as a separate district. The name of Roodezand was changed to Tulbagh which Type of site: Drostdy. | Worcester | Worcester | Provincial Heritage Site | 33°38′50″S 19°26′03″E | The drostdy was the largest and most dignified building of its kind. It was built in the shape of a U, with two wings running back and enclosing an inner court. The style is described by Dr. Mary Cook as Cape-Georgian. "It shows", she writes, "most of the For a century the "Land of Waveren" formed a part of the district of Stellenbosch, until Commissioner De Mist cut off all the territory north of the Breede River and proclaimed it as a separate district. The name of Roodezand was changed to Tulbagh which Type of site: Drostdy. |
| 9/2/110/0009 | Kaapse Draai, 165 High Street, Worcester | Thatched house with two mock-chimney gables to street. Some 2 × 2 sashes with louvred shutters, modernised enclosed stoep with 4 × 4 door. Very dilapidated. Type of site: House Current use: House. | Worcester | Worcester | Provincial Heritage Site | 33°38′53″S 19°26′15″E | Thatched house with two mock-chimney gables to street. Some 2 × 2 sashes with louvred shutters, modernised enclosed stoep with 4 × 4 door. Very dilapidated. Type of site: House Current use: House. |
| 9/2/110/0010 | WORCESTER MUNICIPAL AREA, GENERAL | | Worcester | Worcester | National Monument | | Upload Photo |
| 9/2/110/0010-309 | 43 Church Street, Worcester | Single storey building with hipped iron roof with rectangular vents below. Full length verandah on precast columns on plastered wall. Verandah built in on right with large window. 2 × 2 sashes with louvred shutters. 3 panel glazed door with fanlight. Type of site: Commercial Current use: Estate agents. | Worcester | Worcester | Provincial Heritage Site | 33°38′27″S 19°26′52″E | Single storey building with hipped iron roof with rectangular vents below. Full length verandah on precast columns on plastered wall. Verandah built in on right with large window. 2 × 2 sashes with louvred shutters. 3 panel glazed door with fanlight. Type of site: Commercial Current use: Estate agents. |
| 9/2/110/0010-404 | 22 Fairbairn Street, Worcester | Single storey, 5-bay saddle roof house (now shop) with covered end gables and covered front gable with barge fret and 6 × 6 sash with four pilasters visible, c 1850 (F & C). Rectangular roof vents with plaster surrounds. Double door with small-pane Type of site: House Current use: House. | Worcester | Worcester | Provincial Heritage Site | 33°38′27″S 19°26′53″E | Single storey, 5-bay saddle roof house (now shop) with covered end gables and covered front gable with barge fret and 6 × 6 sash with four pilasters visible, c 1850 (F & C). Rectangular roof vents with plaster surrounds. Double door with small-pane Type of site: House Current use: House. |
| 9/2/110/0011 | 2 Napier Street, Worcester | | Worcester | Worcester | | 33°38′39″S 19°26′12″E | Upload Photo |
| 9/2/110/0012 | 66 Church Street, Worcester | Double storey, parapeted building with string course, partly set back, with rustication and corner quoins. 3 bay section has French doors with louvred shutters to the ground floor and 2 × 2 sashes to the first floor. 2 bay, set back section has 4 panel d Type of site: Commercial Current use: Offices. | Worcester | Worcester | Provincial Heritage Site | 33°38′29″S 19°26′43″E | Double storey, parapeted building with string course, partly set back, with rustication and corner quoins. 3 bay section has French doors with louvred shutters to the ground floor and 2 × 2 sashes to the first floor. 2 bay, set back section has 4 panel d Type of site: Commercial Current use: Offices. |
| 9/2/110/0013 | 69 Porter Street, Worcester | L-shaped, thatched house with mock-chimney end gables. The main gable faces the side and ia Worcester type with four pilasters and 12-pane casement, dated 1841. The street facade has a convex verandah on cast iron drip fret. 2 × 2 double door with upper, Type of site: House Current use: House. | Worcester | Worcester | Provincial Heritage Site | 33°38′54″S 19°26′36″E | L-shaped, thatched house with mock-chimney end gables. The main gable faces the side and ia Worcester type with four pilasters and 12-pane casement, dated 1841. The street facade has a convex verandah on cast iron drip fret. 2 × 2 double door with upper, Type of site: House Current use: House. |
| 9/2/110/0014 | 52 Church Street, Worcester | Single storey, thatched, saddle roof, 3 bay Cape Dutch house with straight end gables. On the left are a chimney and loft door with ladder. The front gable has four pilasters, a 3-lobed pediment and a 6 pane casement window. 12 x 12 sashes with shutters. Type of site: House Current use: House. | Worcester | Worcester | Provincial Heritage Site | 33°38′26″S 19°26′50″E | Single storey, thatched, saddle roof, 3 bay Cape Dutch house with straight end gables. On the left are a chimney and loft door with ladder. The front gable has four pilasters, a 3-lobed pediment and a 6 pane casement window. 12 x 12 sashes with shutters. Type of site: House Current use: House. |
| 9/2/110/0015 | Hex River Mountain Railway Pass, Touws River, Worcester District | | Worcester | Worcester | National Monument | 33°23′52″S 19°46′06″E | Upload Photo |
| 9/2/110/0016 | Afrikaner Museum, 75 Church Street, Worcester | National Monument Type of site: House Previous use: Residential. Current use: Museum. This building is a typical example of the mid-nineteenth century architecture in Worcester. | Worcester | Worcester | Provincial Heritage Site | 33°38′32″S 19°26′41″E | National Monument Type of site: House Previous use: Residential. Current use: Museum. This building is a typical example of the mid-nineteenth century architecture in Worcester. |
| 9/2/110/0017 | Riverside Farm, Quaggaberg, Worcester District | | Worcester | Worcester | National Monument | | Upload Photo |
| 9/2/110/0018 | Uitvlugt 310, Worcester District | Type of site: Farmstead. | | Worcester | Provincial Heritage Site | 33°13′40″S 21°51′25″E | Upload Photo |
| 9/2/110/0019 | 105 High Street, Worcester | | Worcester | Worcester | National Monument | 33°38′45″S 19°26′32″E | Upload Photo |
| 9/2/110/0020 | Municipal Cemetery, Touws River, Worcester | | Worcester | Worcester | | | Upload Photo |
| 9/2/110/0021 | 48 Church Street, Worcester | | Worcester | Worcester | | 33°38′26″S 19°26′50″E | Upload Photo |
| 9/2/110/0022 | Bergplaas, Bokkeveld Formation, Touws River, Worcester District | | Worcester | Worcester | | | Upload Photo |
| 9/2/110/0023 | 40 Russel Street, Worcester | | Worcester | Worcester | | 33°38′36″S 19°27′02″E | Upload Photo |
| 9/2/110/0024 | Glen Heatlie, De Wet, Worcester District | The original part of the Glen Heatlie farmstead, with its Cape Dutch and Victorian features, was presumably erected in 1817. The building was enlarged in 1879 by Thomas Heatlie, who bought the farm in 1851 and extended it. The wagon-house at the rear of t . | | Worcester | Provincial Heritage Site | 33°13′40″S 21°51′25″E | Upload Photo |
| 9/2/110/0025 | 35 Church Street, Worcester | | Worcester | Worcester | National Monument | 33°38′26″S 19°26′55″E | Upload Photo |
| 9/2/110/0026 | Standard Bank, 34-36 Adderley Street, Worcester | | Worcester | Worcester | | 33°38′40″S 19°26′32″E | Upload Photo |
| 9/2/110/0027 | Dutch Reformed Mission Church Complex, Adderley Street, Worcester | Type of site: Church Complex. | Worcester | Worcester | Provincial Heritage Site | 33°38′51″S 19°26′41″E | Type of site: Church Complex. |
| 9/2/110/0027/001 | Old Dutch Reformed Mission Parsonage, 48 Adderley Street, Worcester | 7-bay thatched Cape Dutch house with straight end gables. The front gable is Worcester type, dated 1840, with a 6 × 6 sash and four rusticated pilasteres continuing to ground level, the central two forming part of an architrave to the door. 2 × 2 door Type of site: Pastorie Current use: House. The church building of the D.R. Mission Church, Worcester, and the neighbouring parsonage and old school building, together with the other buildings in the so- called "Rhenish Church Complex", forms a unique historical and architectural group which has cl | Worcester | Worcester | Provincial Heritage Site | 33°38′39″S 19°26′32″E | 7-bay thatched Cape Dutch house with straight end gables. The front gable is Worcester type, dated 1840, with a 6 × 6 sash and four rusticated pilasteres continuing to ground level, the central two forming part of an architrave to the door. 2 × 2 door Type of site: Pastorie Current use: House. The church building of the D.R. Mission Church, Worcester, and the neighbouring parsonage and old school building, together with the other buildings in the so- called "Rhenish Church Complex", forms a unique historical and architectural group which has cl |
| 9/2/110/0027/002 | Dutch Reformed Mission Church, 46 Adderley Street, Worcester | National Monument Type of site: Church Current use: Church : Dutch Reformed Mission. The church building of the D.R. Mission Church, Worcester, and the neighbouring parsonage and old school building, together with the other buildings in the so- called "Rhenish Church Complex", forms a unique historical and architectural group which has cl | Worcester | Worcester | Provincial Heritage Site | 33°38′39″S 19°26′32″E | National Monument Type of site: Church Current use: Church : Dutch Reformed Mission. The church building of the D.R. Mission Church, Worcester, and the neighbouring parsonage and old school building, together with the other buildings in the so- called "Rhenish Church Complex", forms a unique historical and architectural group which has cl |
| 9/2/110/0028 | 26 Fairbairn Street, Worcester | | Worcester | Worcester | National Monument | 33°38′28″S 19°26′53″E | Upload Photo |
| 9/2/110/0029 | Railway Station, Tulbagh Street, Worcester | | Worcester | Worcester | Pending Declaration | 33°38′22″S 19°26′28″E | Upload Photo |
| 9/2/110/0030 | 66 Fairbairn Street, Worcester | | Worcester | Worcester | | 33°38′40″S 19°27′01″E | Upload Photo |
| 9/2/110/0031 | 20 Fairbairn Street, Worcester | Thatched Cape Dutch house with fish-tail end-gables with loft. the front gable is Worcester-type, with four pilasters, a pediment on double string course and louvred loft window. Concavo/convex verandah on pipe columns with wooden barge fret and diamond Type of site: House Current use: House. | Worcester | Worcester | Provincial Heritage Site | 33°38′25″S 19°26′52″E | Thatched Cape Dutch house with fish-tail end-gables with loft. the front gable is Worcester-type, with four pilasters, a pediment on double string course and louvred loft window. Concavo/convex verandah on pipe columns with wooden barge fret and diamond Type of site: House Current use: House. |
| 9/2/110/0032 | 12 Fairbairn Street, Worcester | | Worcester | Worcester | National Monument | 33°38′23″S 19°26′50″E | Upload Photo |
| 9/2/110/0033 | Eensgevonden, Voorzorg, Worcester District | Type of site: Farmstead. | | Worcester | Provincial Heritage Site | 33°13′40″S 21°51′25″E | Upload Photo |
| 9/2/110/0034 | 36 Church Street, Worcester | | Worcester | Worcester | National Monument | 33°38′23″S 19°26′55″E | Upload Photo |
| 9/2/110/0035 | Almarde Homestead, Sonskyn, Worcester District | Type of site: Farmstead. | | Worcester | Provincial Heritage Site | 33°13′40″S 21°51′25″E | Upload Photo |
| 9/2/110/0036 | Farieda's Curtain Centre, 65-67 Adderley Street, Worcester | | Worcester | Worcester | National Monument | 33°38′49″S 19°26′41″E | Upload Photo |
| 9/2/110/0037 | 46 Durban Street, Worcester | | Worcester | Worcester | | 33°38′43″S 19°27′03″E | Upload Photo |
| 9/2/110/0038 | 151 Church Street, Worcester | | Worcester | Worcester | | 33°38′46″S 19°26′14″E | Upload Photo |
| 9/2/110/0039 | 22 Riebeeck Street, Worcester | | Worcester | Worcester | | 33°38′23″S 19°27′00″E | Upload Photo |
| 9/2/110/0040 | Old Technical College, 22 Adderley Street, Worcester | National Monument This double-storeyed building dates from about 1860. Type of site: House Current use: House. This double-storeyed building dates from about 1860. It has typical Georgian characteristics, such as the sash windows, the cornice as well as the proportions, size and positioning of the windows. The building is also an important part of the historic cen | Worcester | Worcester | Provincial Heritage Site | 33°38′38″S 19°26′32″E | National Monument This double-storeyed building dates from about 1860. Type of site: House Current use: House. This double-storeyed building dates from about 1860. It has typical Georgian characteristics, such as the sash windows, the cornice as well as the proportions, size and positioning of the windows. The building is also an important part of the historic cen |
| 9/2/110/0041 | Karbonaatjieskraal, Touws River, Worcester District | | Worcester | Worcester | National Monument | | Upload Photo |
| 9/2/110/0042 | 78 Stockenstrom Street, Worcester | Double storey, 3-bay house with stepped-up parapet decorated with scrolls and two string courses with two rectangular and one round vent between. Corner quoins and moulded plaster surrounds to openings. Small 6 × 6 sashes to first floor. Large 6 × 6 sash Type of site: House Current use: House. | Worcester | Worcester | Provincial Heritage Site | 33°38′46″S 19°26′56″E | Double storey, 3-bay house with stepped-up parapet decorated with scrolls and two string courses with two rectangular and one round vent between. Corner quoins and moulded plaster surrounds to openings. Small 6 × 6 sashes to first floor. Large 6 × 6 sash Type of site: House Current use: House. |
| 9/2/110/0043 | 78a Stockenstrom Street, Worcester | 3-bay Cape Dutch house with iron roof and straight end gables. Front gable has 4 pilasters and winged cap and 3-pane casement. Verandah on plastered brick columns. 6 × 6 sashes; 3 × 3 double door with fanlight. On the right is a garage door with cut-off Type of site: House Current use: House. This excellent example of a gabled Worcester building, dating from c.1870, forms part of an unusual complex of adjoining buildings. The attached waenhuis still retains its original clipped doors, traditional to Worcester. | Worcester | Worcester | Register | 33°38′46″S 19°26′57″E | 3-bay Cape Dutch house with iron roof and straight end gables. Front gable has 4 pilasters and winged cap and 3-pane casement. Verandah on plastered brick columns. 6 × 6 sashes; 3 × 3 double door with fanlight. On the right is a garage door with cut-off Type of site: House Current use: House. This excellent example of a gabled Worcester building, dating from c.1870, forms part of an unusual complex of adjoining buildings. The attached waenhuis still retains its original clipped doors, traditional to Worcester. |
| 9/2/110/0044 | 64 Porter Street, Worcester | | Worcester | Worcester | National register | 33°38′54″S 19°26′31″E | Upload Photo |
| 9/2/110/0045 | 66 Porter Street, Worcester | | Worcester | Worcester | | 33°38′54″S 19°26′32″E | Upload Photo |
| 9/2/110/0046 | 96 Durban Street, Worcester | Thatched, 7-bay Cape Dutch house with straight end gables (with loft door). Front gable of Worcester-type but with only one string course below pediment and with bricked up window opening. Full-length, hipped verandah on cast iron columns and brackets, Type of site: House Current use: House. | Worcester | Worcester | Provisional Protection | 33°38′51″S 19°26′44″E | Thatched, 7-bay Cape Dutch house with straight end gables (with loft door). Front gable of Worcester-type but with only one string course below pediment and with bricked up window opening. Full-length, hipped verandah on cast iron columns and brackets, Type of site: House Current use: House. |
| 9/2/110/0047 | 78 Fairbairn Street, Worcester | | Worcester | Worcester | National Monument | 33°38′43″S 19°27′04″E | Upload Photo |
| 9/2/110/0048 | 14 Riebeeck Street, Worcester | | Worcester | Worcester | | 33°38′20″S 19°26′57″E | Upload Photo |
| 9/2/110/0049 | Old Gaol, 1 Distillery Road, Worcester | The First Gaol in Worcester was erected in 1821. Type of site: Gaol. | Worcester | Worcester | Provincial Heritage Site | 33°38′52″S 19°26′02″E | The First Gaol in Worcester was erected in 1821. Type of site: Gaol. |
| 9/2/110/0050 | 24 Porter Street, Worcester | National Monument The land on which this house stands was granted to J. F. van der Graaff on 15 July 1822. The house, which was erected predominantly in the Cape Dutch style, was presumably built by him in 1825. It is one of the oldest houses in Worcester. Type of site: House Current use: House. | Worcester | Worcester | Provincial Heritage Site | 33°38′42″S 19°26′23″E | National Monument The land on which this house stands was granted to J. F. van der Graaff on 15 July 1822. The house, which was erected predominantly in the Cape Dutch style, was presumably built by him in 1825. It is one of the oldest houses in Worcester. Type of site: House Current use: House. |
| 9/2/110/0051 | 11 Fairbairn Street, Worcester | | Worcester | Worcester | National Monument | 33°38′22″S 19°26′51″E | Upload Photo |
| 9/2/110/0052 | 90 Durban Street, Worcester | | Worcester | Worcester | | 33°38′51″S 19°26′46″E | Upload Photo |
| 9/2/110/0053 | Doornrivier farmstead, Worcester District | The road from Worcester to Villiersdorp runs almost due south and crosses the Breede River and the Brandvlei Dam. A few kilometres beyond the dam one takes a farm road to the left to reach the farm Doornrivier which is 35 km from Worcester. Built on high Doornrivier is one of the oldest farms in this vicinity. Like many other farms it was probably first used as a cattle-post, but by 1754 when the adjacent farm Dasboschrivier was granted, the northern boundary of Dasboschrivier was defined as "the farm of Type of site: Farm Complex. An exceptionally fine Cape Dutch House, built in 1790, and the old watermill building adjacent to it. | | Worcester | Provincial Heritage Site | 33°13′40″S 21°51′25″E | Upload Photo |
| 9/2/110/0054 | DE DOORNS MUNICIPAL AREA, WORCESTER DISTRICT, GENERAL | | Worcester | Worcester | National Monument | | Upload Photo |
| 9/2/110/0055 | 125 Church Street, Worcester | | Worcester | Worcester | | 33°38′43″S 19°26′21″E | Upload Photo |
| 9/2/110/0056 | Transit of Venus, Old Douglas Hotel, Touws River, Worcester District | The winding road over the Hex River Pass takes one from the spectacular Hex River Valley with almost dramatic suddenness right into the Karoo. The first town to be reached is Touws River, a railway centre. There behind the Douglas Hotel, stand two concret. | Touws River | Worcester | Provincial Heritage Site | 33°20′23″S 20°01′38″E | Upload Photo |
| 9/2/110/0057 | Worcester Museum, Beck House, 21 Baring Street, Worcester | National Monument The house was built in 1841 and had been the property of the well-known Beck family for many years. Type of site: House Previous use: Residential. Current use: Museum. This building is a typical example of the mid-nineteenth century architecture in Worcester. The house was built in 1841 and had been the property of the well-known Beck family for many years. | Worcester | Worcester | Provincial Heritage Site | 33°38′33″S 19°26′40″E | National Monument The house was built in 1841 and had been the property of the well-known Beck family for many years. Type of site: House Previous use: Residential. Current use: Museum. This building is a typical example of the mid-nineteenth century architecture in Worcester. The house was built in 1841 and had been the property of the well-known Beck family for many years. |
| 9/2/110/0058 | 37 Russel Street, Worcester | Thatched 5-bay Cape Dutch house with mock-chimney end gable, attached to No. 38. Wide holbol gable with semicircular pediment and blocked-up window. 3 × 3 double door with geometric fanlight, c 1850 (F & C), 2 × 2 sashes. Full-length hipped verandah on p Type of site: House Current use: House. This house with its fine gable was built in 1860 and is a good example of Nineteenth Century Architecture in Worcester. | Worcester | Worcester | Provincial Heritage Site | 33°38′37″S 19°27′04″E | Thatched 5-bay Cape Dutch house with mock-chimney end gable, attached to No. 38. Wide holbol gable with semicircular pediment and blocked-up window. 3 × 3 double door with geometric fanlight, c 1850 (F & C), 2 × 2 sashes. Full-length hipped verandah on p Type of site: House Current use: House. This house with its fine gable was built in 1860 and is a good example of Nineteenth Century Architecture in Worcester. |
| 9/2/110/0059 | St James the Great Church, Waterloo Road, Worcester | This church was built in 1859 in the Neo-Gothic style. It has very fine stained glass windows, the oldest of which dates back to 1841. Type of site: Church Current use: Church : Anglican. | Worcester | Worcester | Provincial Heritage Site | 33°38′42″S 19°26′37″E | This church was built in 1859 in the Neo-Gothic style. It has very fine stained glass windows, the oldest of which dates back to 1841. Type of site: Church Current use: Church : Anglican. Media related to St James the Great Church, Worcester at Wikimedia Commons |
| 9/2/110/0060 | Dutch Reformed Church, Church Street, Worcester | This Gothic cruciform church, the cornerstone of which was laid on 7 February 1831 by the Civic Commissioner of Worcester, P. J. Truter, was consecrated on 3 February 1832. Type of site: Church Current use: Church : Dutch Reformed. | Worcester | Worcester | Provincial Heritage Site | 33°38′30″S 19°26′44″E | This Gothic cruciform church, the cornerstone of which was laid on 7 February 1831 by the Civic Commissioner of Worcester, P. J. Truter, was consecrated on 3 February 1832. Type of site: Church Current use: Church : Dutch Reformed. |
| 9/2/110/0061 | De Doorns homestead, De Doorns, Hex River Valley, Worcester District | The farm De Doorns, which was granted to Gabriel Rossouw in 1759, is one of the oldest farms in the Hex River Valley. The original portion of this Cape Dutch house, which dates from approximately 1796, was enlarged to its present H-form by Pieter Jacobus. | | Worcester | Provincial Heritage Site | 33°28′40″S 19°40′01″E | Upload Photo |
| 9/2/110/0062 | Eikenbosch homestead, Worcester District | This dwelling-house and outbuilding with its predominantly Cape Dutch features is situated on land granted in 1716 to the pioneer of Goudini, Pieter du Toit. | | Worcester | Provincial Heritage Site | 33°13′40″S 21°51′25″E | Upload Photo |
| 9/2/110/0063 | 86 Durban Street, Worcester | National Monument This Cape Dutch house, with its two pedimented concavo-convex gables, dates from 1824. The building, which was Victorianised in about 1906, was bought by the Afrikaanse Christelike Vrouevereniging in 1974 and restored to its original state under the direc Type of site: House Current use: House. | Worcester | Worcester | Provincial Heritage Site | 34°38′50″S 19°26′48″E | National Monument This Cape Dutch house, with its two pedimented concavo-convex gables, dates from 1824. The building, which was Victorianised in about 1906, was bought by the Afrikaanse Christelike Vrouevereniging in 1974 and restored to its original state under the direc Type of site: House Current use: House. |
| 9/2/110/0064 | 162 Church Street, Worcester | National Monument The core of this impressive Victorian dwelling-house was originally the first church in Worcester. Type of site: House Current use: House. The core of this impressive Victorian dwelling-house was originally the first church in Worcester. The verandah with its cast-iron work and the cast-iron crown mouldings on the roof of the house are particularly noteworthy. | Worcester | Worcester | Provincial Heritage Site | 33°38′46″S 19°26′10″E | Upload Photo |
| 9/2/110/0065 | 72 Fairbairn Street, Worcester | National Monument This dwelling-house in the vernacular building style with its Cape Dutch and Victorian elements was erected by H. Afrika from 1858—1859. The property forms an integral part of the architectural character of Fairbairn Street, which forms a significant part Type of site: House Current use: House. | Worcester | Worcester | Provincial Heritage Site | 33°38′42″S 19°27′02″E | National Monument This dwelling-house in the vernacular building style with its Cape Dutch and Victorian elements was erected by H. Afrika from 1858—1859. The property forms an integral part of the architectural character of Fairbairn Street, which forms a significant part Type of site: House Current use: House. |
| 9/2/110/0066 | 1 and 3 Trappes Street and 163 Tulbagh Street, Worcester | National Monument (see 163 Tulbagh Street). The original portion of this Cape Dutch building complex with its typical holbol gable was erected in 1820/21 and is reputed to be the oldest existing dwelling in Worcester. The front portion of the complex with its typical Worcester gables dates from the Type of site: House Current use: House. | Worcester | Worcester | Provincial Heritage Site | 33°38′41″S 19°26′07″E | National Monument (see 163 Tulbagh Street). The original portion of this Cape Dutch building complex with its typical holbol gable was erected in 1820/21 and is reputed to be the oldest existing dwelling in Worcester. The front portion of the complex with its typical Worcester gables dates from the Type of site: House Current use: House. |
| 9/2/110/0066/1 | 1 Trappes Street, Worcester | | Worcester | Worcester | National Monument | 33°38′41″S 19°26′07″E | Upload Photo |
| 9/2/110/0066/2 | 3 Trappes Street, Worcester | | Worcester | Worcester | National Monument | 33°38′42″S 19°26′07″E | Upload Photo |
| 9/2/110/0066/3 | 163 Tulbagh Street, Worcester | | Worcester | Worcester | National Monument | 33°38′41″S 19°26′07″E | Upload Photo |
| 9/2/110/0067 | Homestead, Stettyn, Worcester District | Stettyn, which has been in the possession of the Botha family since 1818, was originally granted to Jan Cloete and Jan Jurgen Radyn on 26 September 1714. The Cape Dutch farm-house, the original portion of which was built in 1777 by the then owner Schalk v Type of site: Farmstead. | | Worcester | Provincial Heritage Site | 33°13′40″S 21°51′25″E | Upload Photo |
| 9/2/110/0068 | 28 Church Street, Worcester | Single storey, 5 bay Cape Dutch house with thatch saddle roof and straight end gables. Pedimented Worcester gable with arched 6 × 6 sash. 12 x 12 sashes; 4 × 4 double door with semicircular fanlight. Stoep with garden wall and posts. Karoo-type extension Type of site: House Current use: House. | Worcester | Worcester | Provincial Heritage Site | 33°38′22″S 19°26′57″E | Single storey, 5 bay Cape Dutch house with thatch saddle roof and straight end gables. Pedimented Worcester gable with arched 6 × 6 sash. 12 x 12 sashes; 4 × 4 double door with semicircular fanlight. Stoep with garden wall and posts. Karoo-type extension Type of site: House Current use: House. |
| 9/2/110/0069 | 63 Baring Street, Worcester | | Worcester | Worcester | National Monument | 33°38′46″S 19°26′48″E | Upload Photo |
| 9/2/110/0070 | Evangelical Lutheran Church, Adderley Street, Worcester | Narrow church with buttressed steeple with octagonal spire. Louvred vents with pointed arches to steeple. door with pointed arch. Type of site: Church Current use: Church : Lutheran. | Worcester | Worcester | Provincial Heritage Site | 33°38′36″S 19°26′31″E | Narrow church with buttressed steeple with octagonal spire. Louvred vents with pointed arches to steeple. door with pointed arch. Type of site: Church Current use: Church : Lutheran. |
| 9/2/110/0071 | Church Square, Worcester | Type of site: Square. Church Square forms an integral part of the original, town plan of Worcester as it was drawn up in 1819. In former times the Square was often used for open-air meetings of every kind, and with the surrounding buildings, it forms the historical and archite | Worcester | Worcester | Provincial Heritage Site | 33°38′29″S 19°26′46″E | Type of site: Square. Church Square forms an integral part of the original, town plan of Worcester as it was drawn up in 1819. In former times the Square was often used for open-air meetings of every kind, and with the surrounding buildings, it forms the historical and archite |
| 9/2/110/0072 | 140 Church Street, Worcester | | Worcester | Worcester | National Monument | 33°38′43″S 19°26′15″E | Upload Photo |
| 9/2/110/0073 | Water furrows, Worcester | | Worcester | Worcester | | | Upload Photo |
| 9/2/110/0074 | 42 Church Street, Worcester | | Worcester | Worcester | Pending Declaration | 33°38′24″S 19°26′54″E | Upload Photo |
| 9/2/110/0075 | WORCESTER MAGISTERIAL DISTRICT, GENERAL | | Worcester | Worcester | | | Upload Photo |
| 9/2/110/0076 | Congregational Church, 73 Church Street, Worcester | | Worcester | Worcester | | 33°38′33″S 19°26′41″E | Upload Photo |
| 9/2/110/0077 | ZWELETEMBA MUNICIPAL AREA, WORCESTER | | Worcester | Worcester | | | Upload Photo |
| 9/2/110/0078 | Freedom Square, Zwelatemba, Worcester | | Worcester | Worcester | | | Upload Photo |
| 9/2/110/0079 | 22 Fairbairn Street and 43 Church Street, Worcester | | Worcester | Worcester | Provincial Heritage Site | 33°38′27″S 19°26′52″E | |
| 9/2/110/0080 | 25 Baring Street, Worcester | | Worcester | Worcester | | 33°38′35″S 19°26′41″E | Upload Photo |
| 9/2/110/0081 | Queens Square, block bounded by Somerset, Russel, Trappes, and Church streets, Worcester | | Worcester | Worcester | | 33°38′53″S 19°26′09″E | Upload Photo |
| 9/2/110/0082 | TOUWS RIVER MUNICIPAL AREA, GENERAL | | Worcester | Worcester | | | Upload Photo |
| 9/2/110/0083 | TOUWS RIVER MAGISTERIAL | | Worcester | Worcester | | | Upload Photo |
| 9/2/110/0084 | Kannetsvlei, Worcester District | | Worcester | Worcester | | | Upload Photo |
