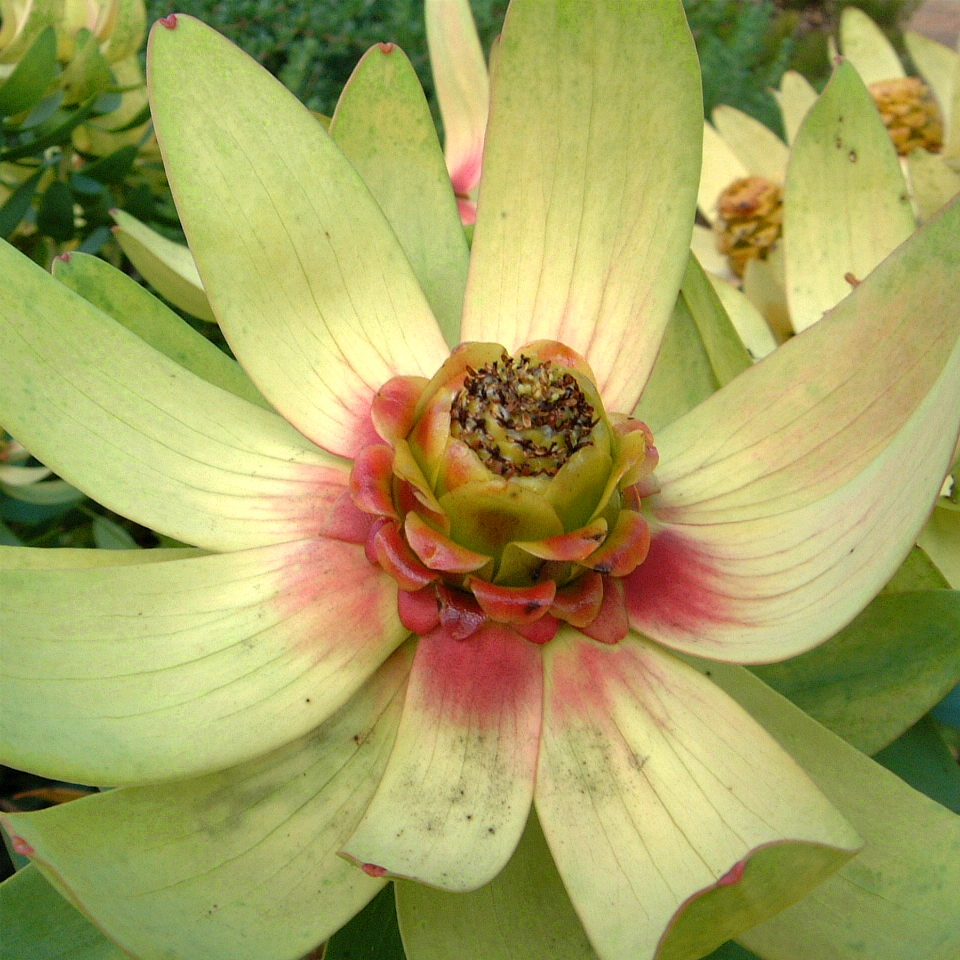

Conservation status
- Least Concern (IUCN 3.1)

Scientific classification
- Kingdom: Plantae
- Clade: Tracheophytes
- Clade: Angiosperms
- Clade: Eudicots
- Order: Proteales
- Family: Proteaceae
- Genus: Leucadendron
- Species: L. tinctum

Binomial name
- Leucadendron tinctum I.Williams

= Leucadendron tinctum =

Species of plant

Leucadendron tinctum, the spicy conebush, is a flower-bearing shrub that belongs to the genus Leucadendron and forms part of the fynbos. The plant is native to the Western Cape, where it occurs in the Hex River Mountains up to Hottentots Holland Mountains and Langeberg. The shrub grows 1.3 m tall and bears flowers from July to August.

Fire destroys the plant but the seeds survive. The seeds are stored in a cone on the female plant and fall to the ground two months after the plant has flowered. The plant is unisexual and there are male and female plants. The fertilization is done by small beetles. The plant grows mainly in rocky or sandstone soils at heights of 300–1000 m.

In Afrikaans the plant is known as the toffie-appel tolbos.

== Gallery ==
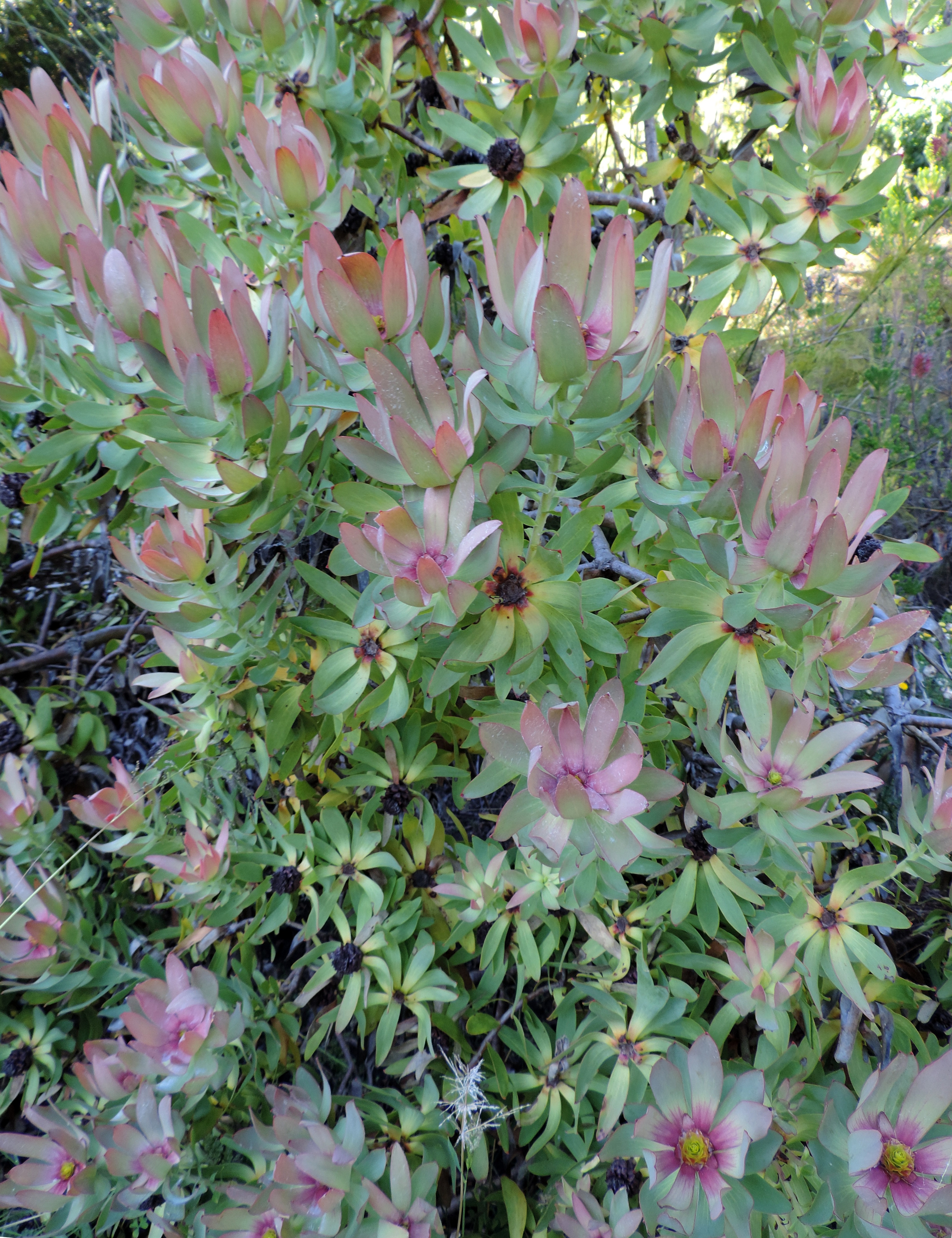

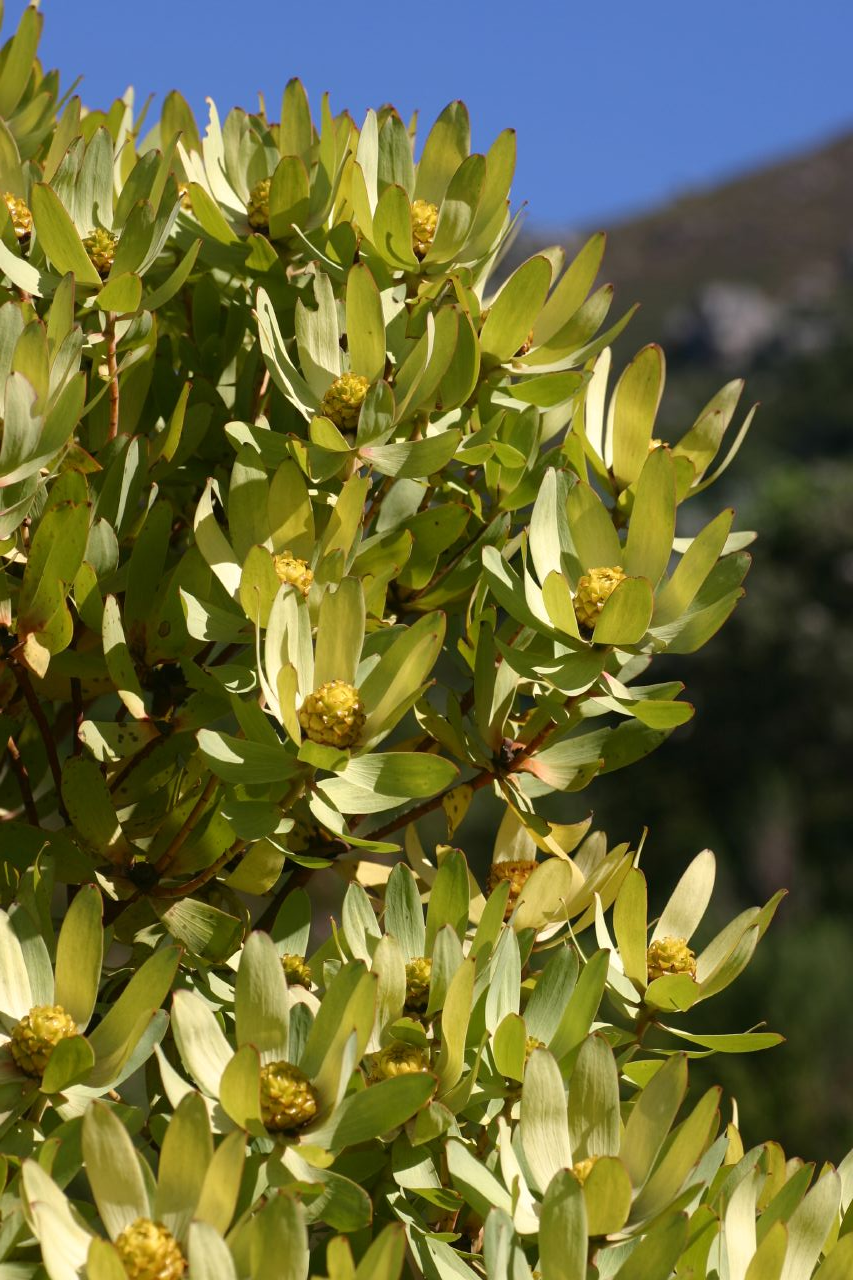

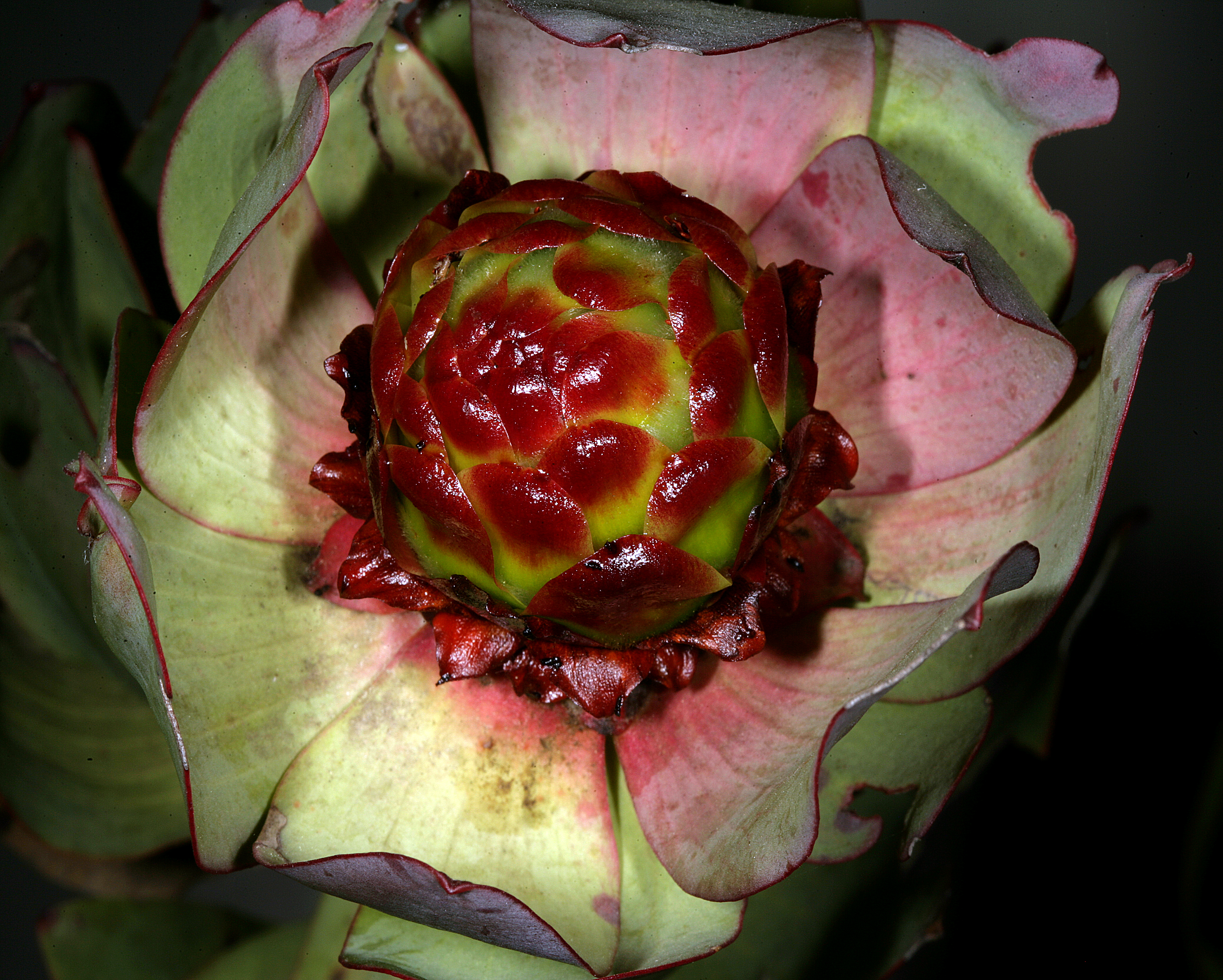

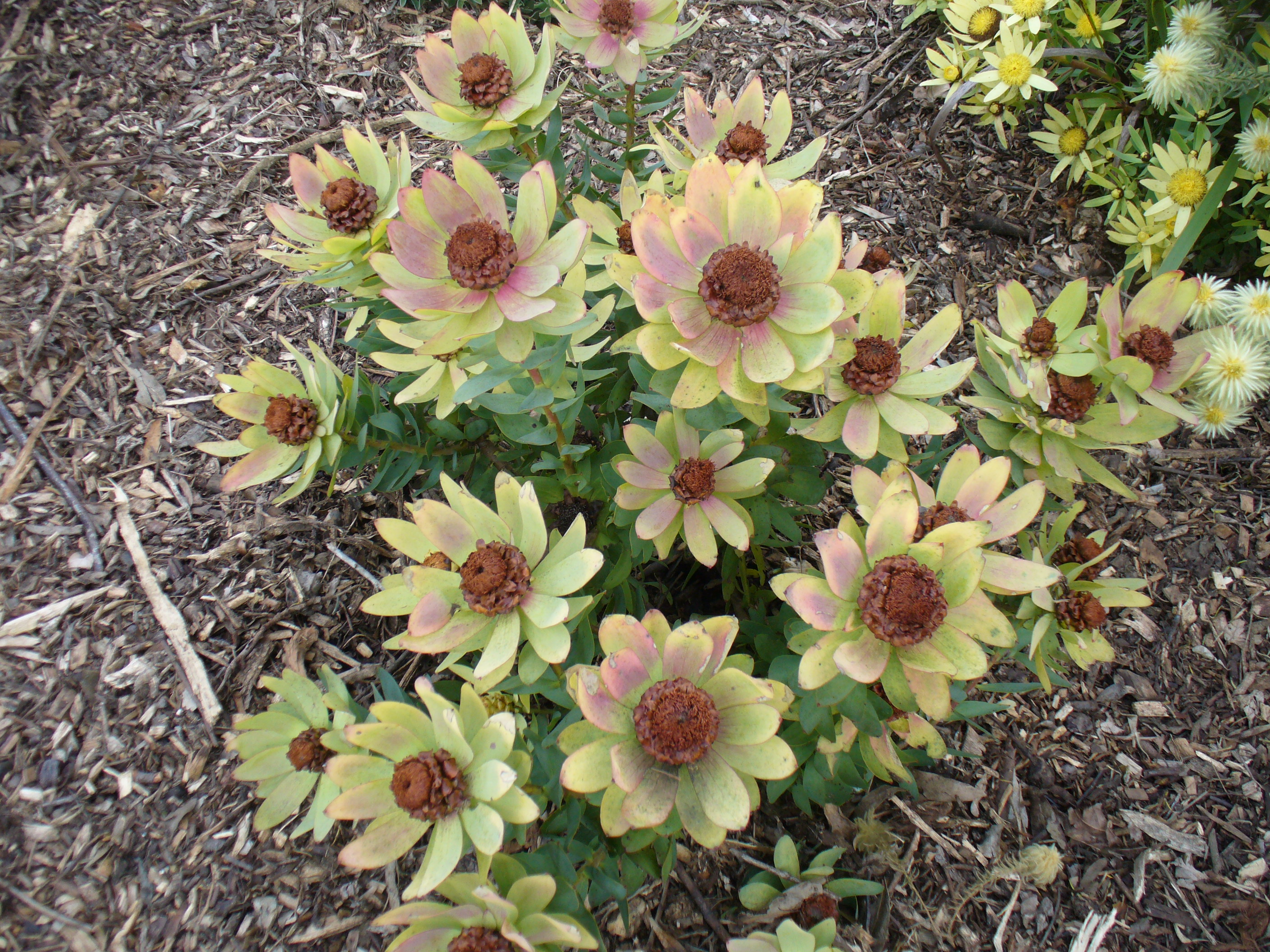

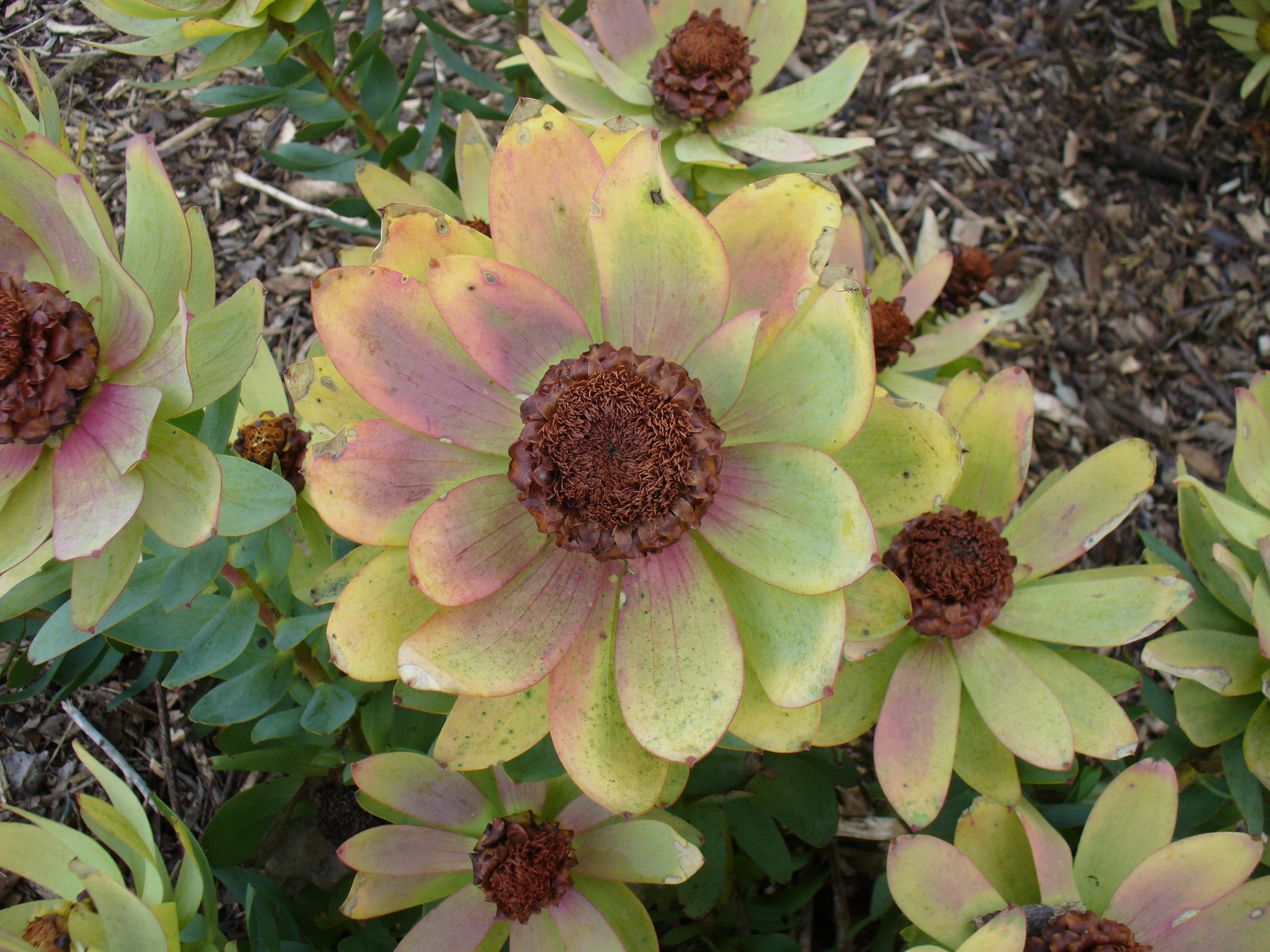

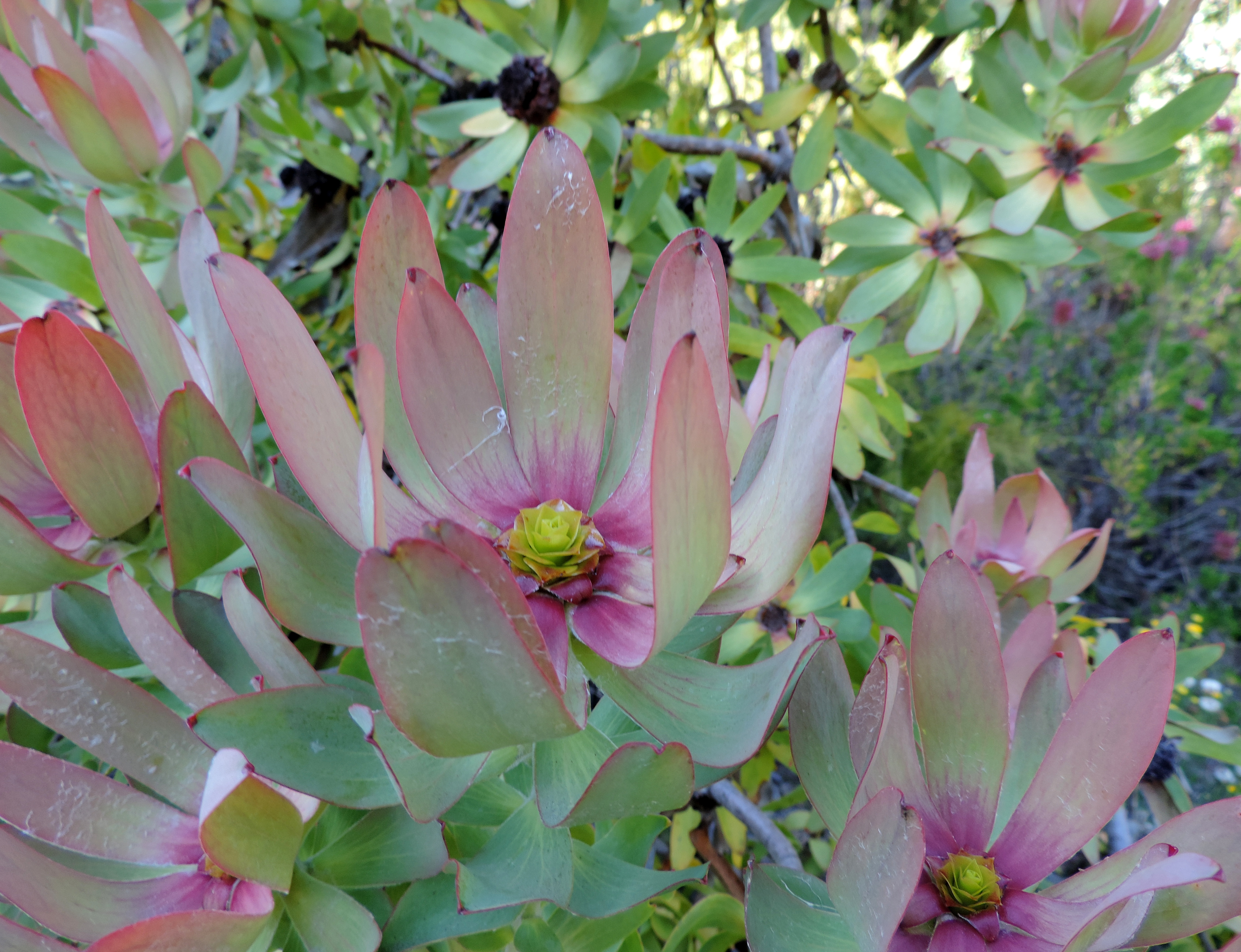

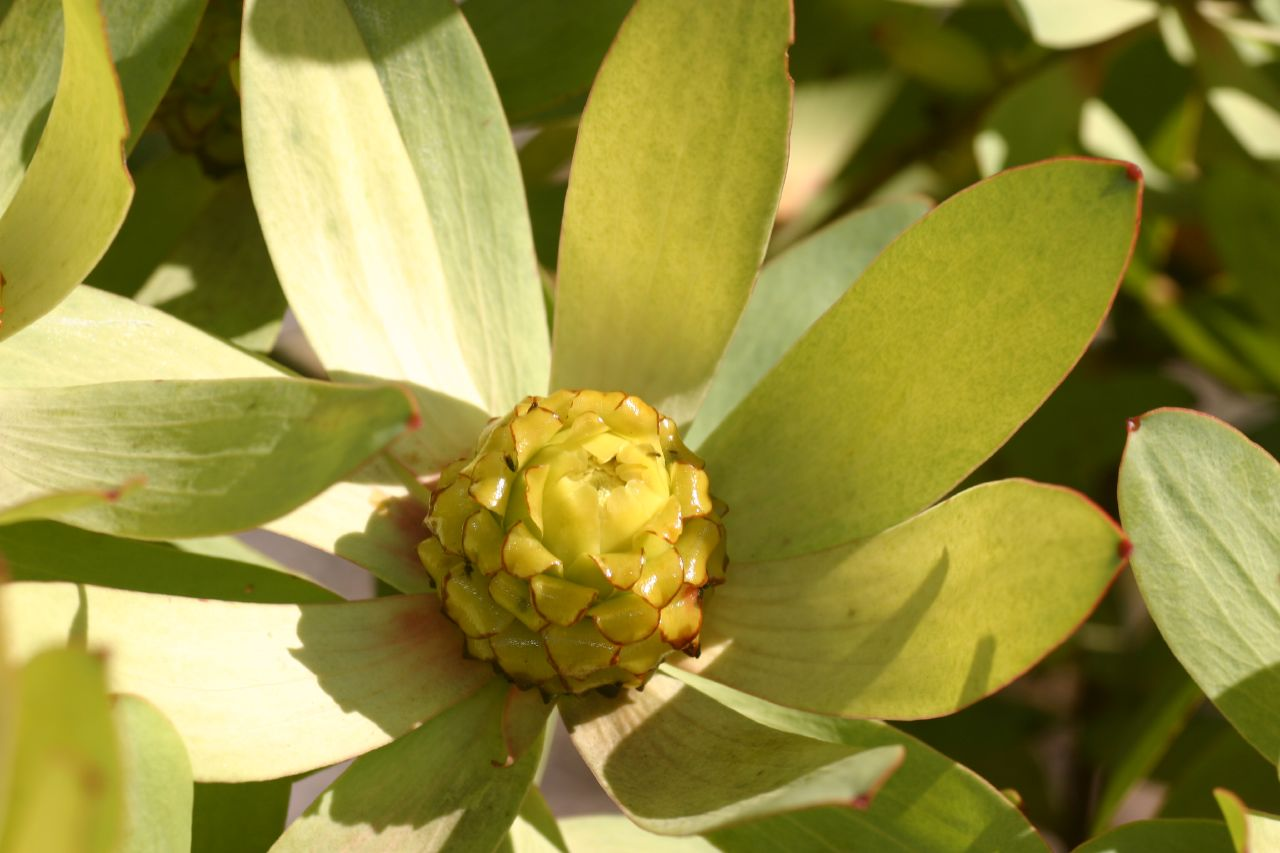

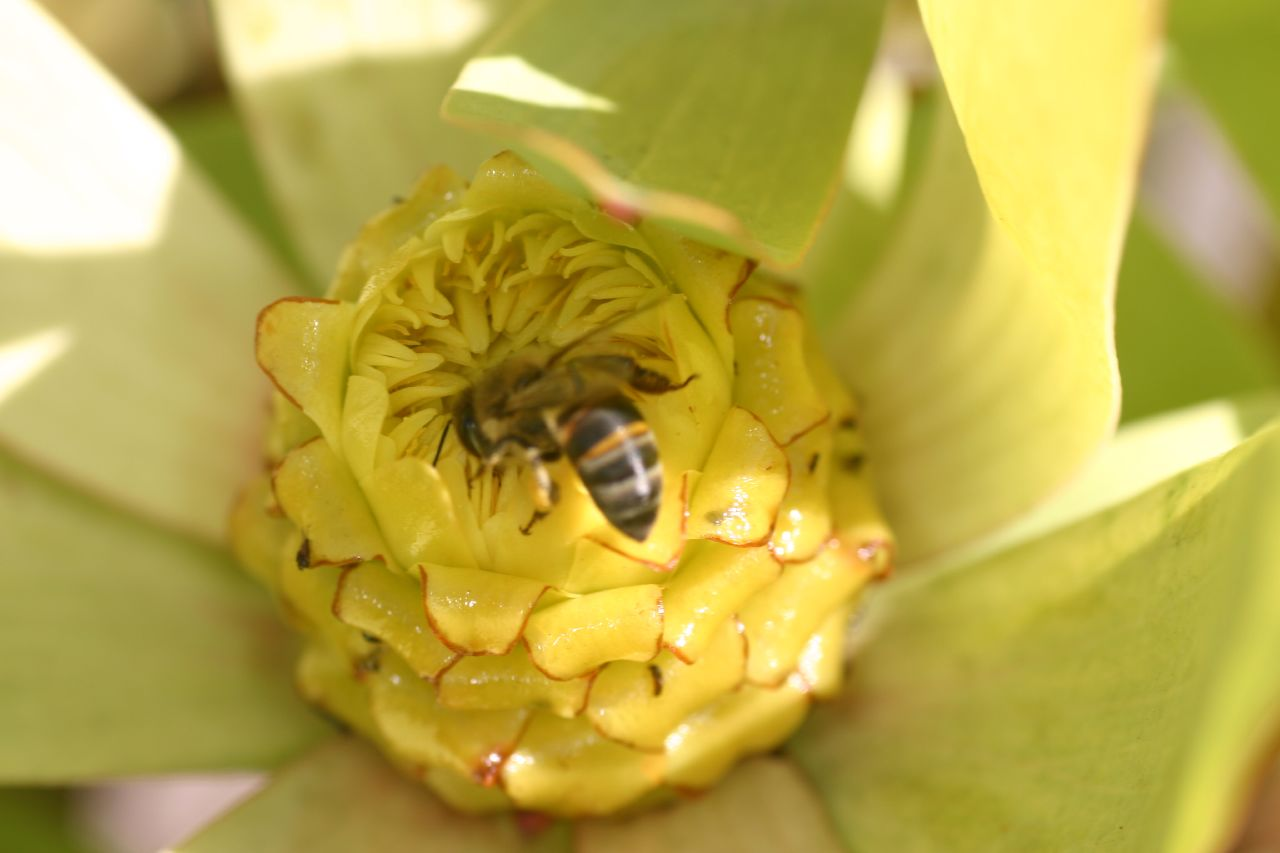

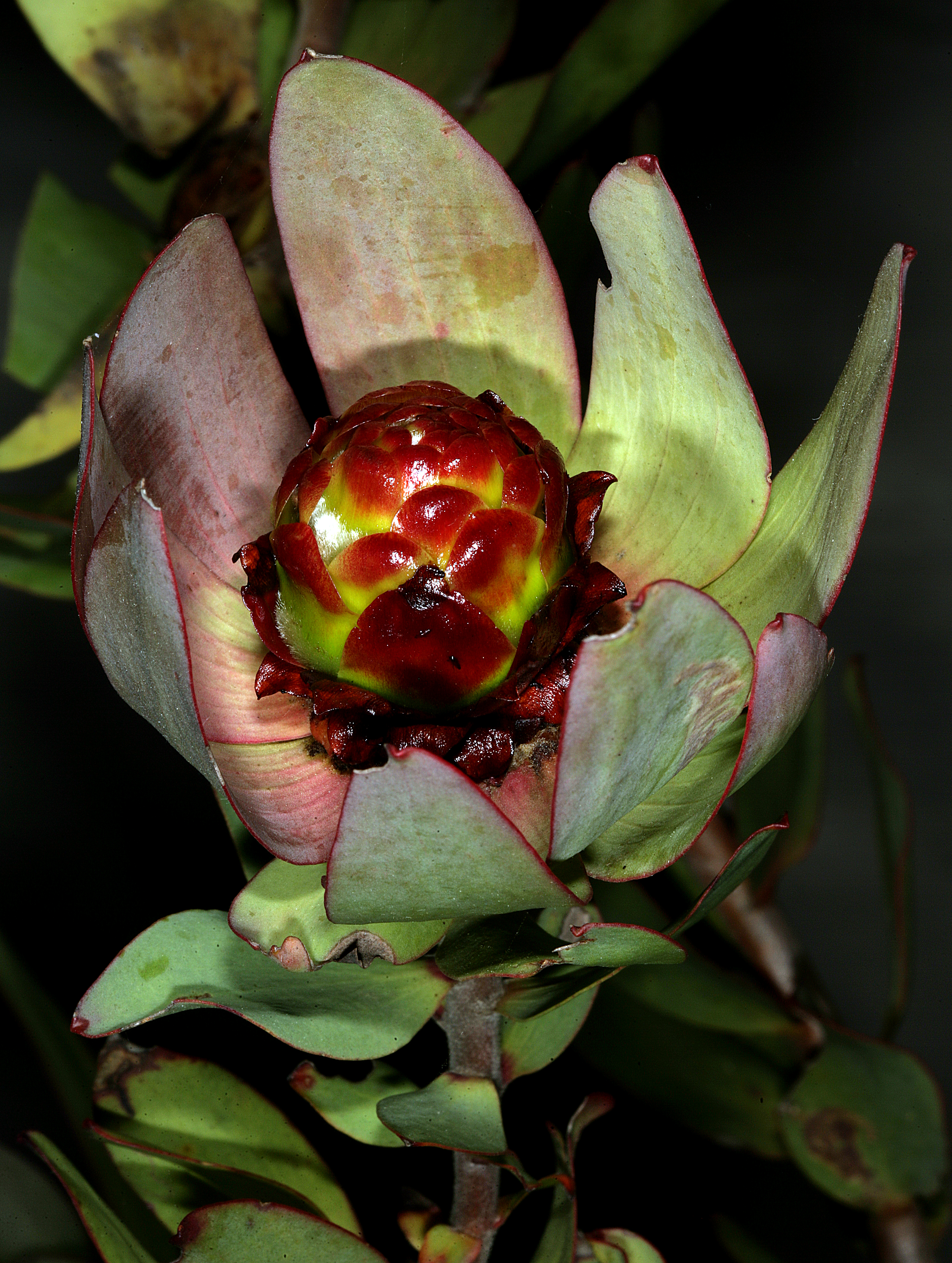

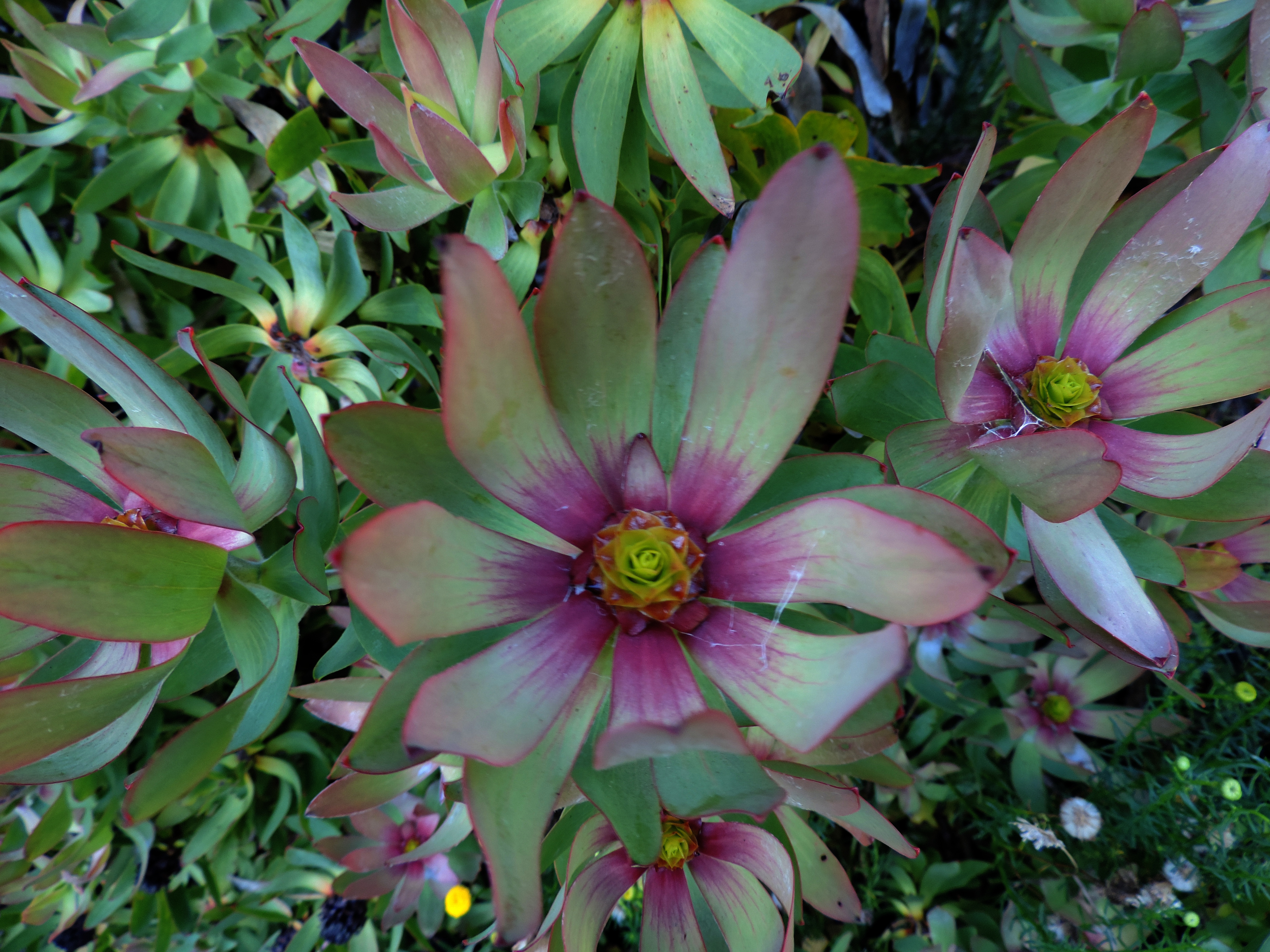

== Sources ==
- http://redlist.sanbi.org/species.php?species=794-146
- http://pza.sanbi.org/leucadendron-tinctum
- http://biodiversityexplorer.info/plants/proteaceae/leucadendron_tinctum.htm
- https://www.proteaatlas.org.za/conebu5.htm
