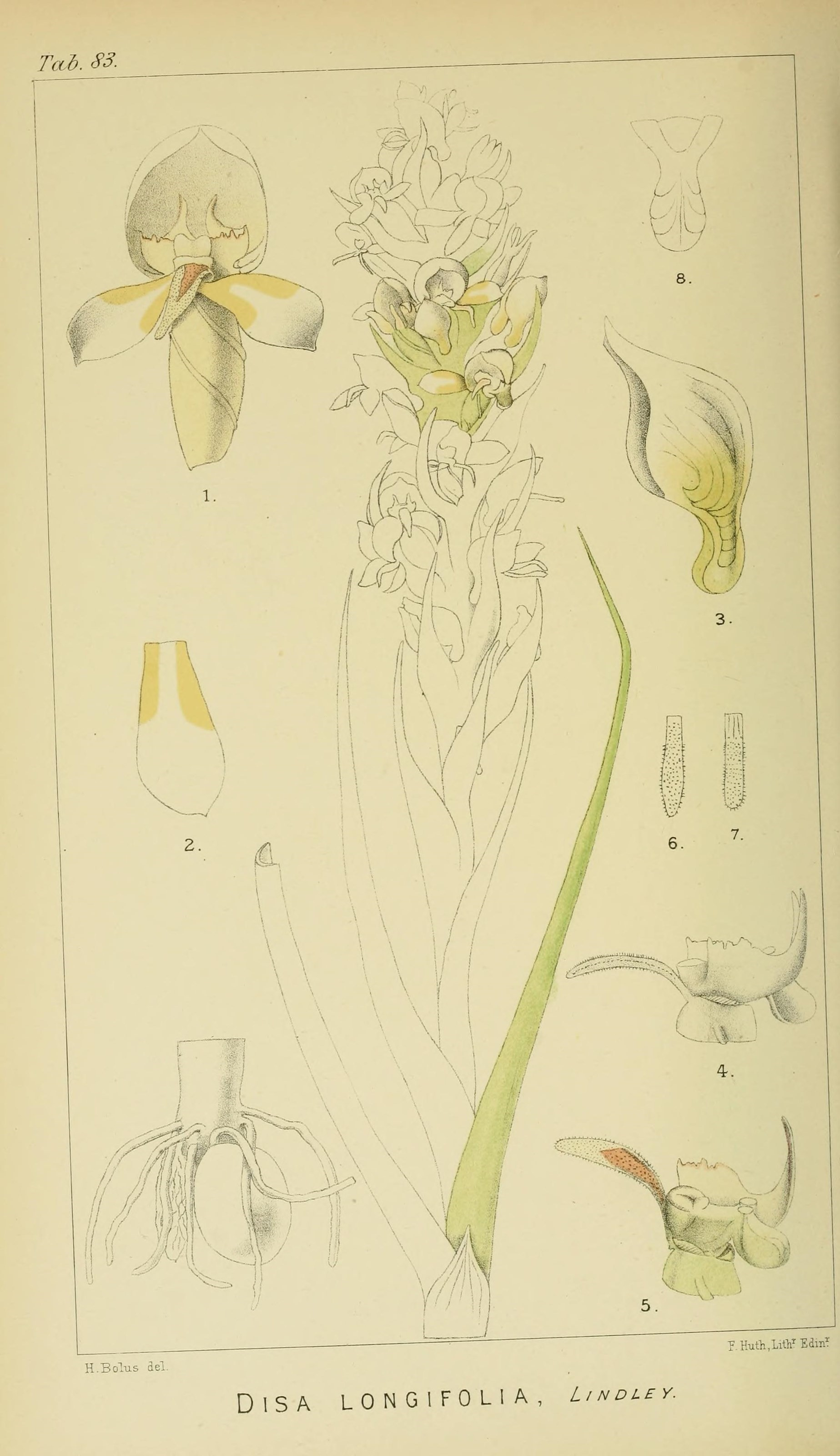

Scientific classification
- Kingdom: Plantae
- Clade: Tracheophytes
- Clade: Angiosperms
- Clade: Monocots
- Order: Asparagales
- Family: Orchidaceae
- Subfamily: Orchidoideae
- Genus: Disa
- Species: D. longifolia

Binomial name
- Disa longifolia Lindl.

= Disa longifolia =

Species of flowering plant

Disa longifolia is a perennial plant and geophyte belonging to the genus Disa and is part of the fynbos. The plant is endemic to the Western Cape and occurs from Piketberg to the Hex River Mountains and Caledon. There are currently five subpopulations and the species has lost habitat to crop cultivation and dam construction. The plant is currently threatened by invasive plants and further dam construction.
