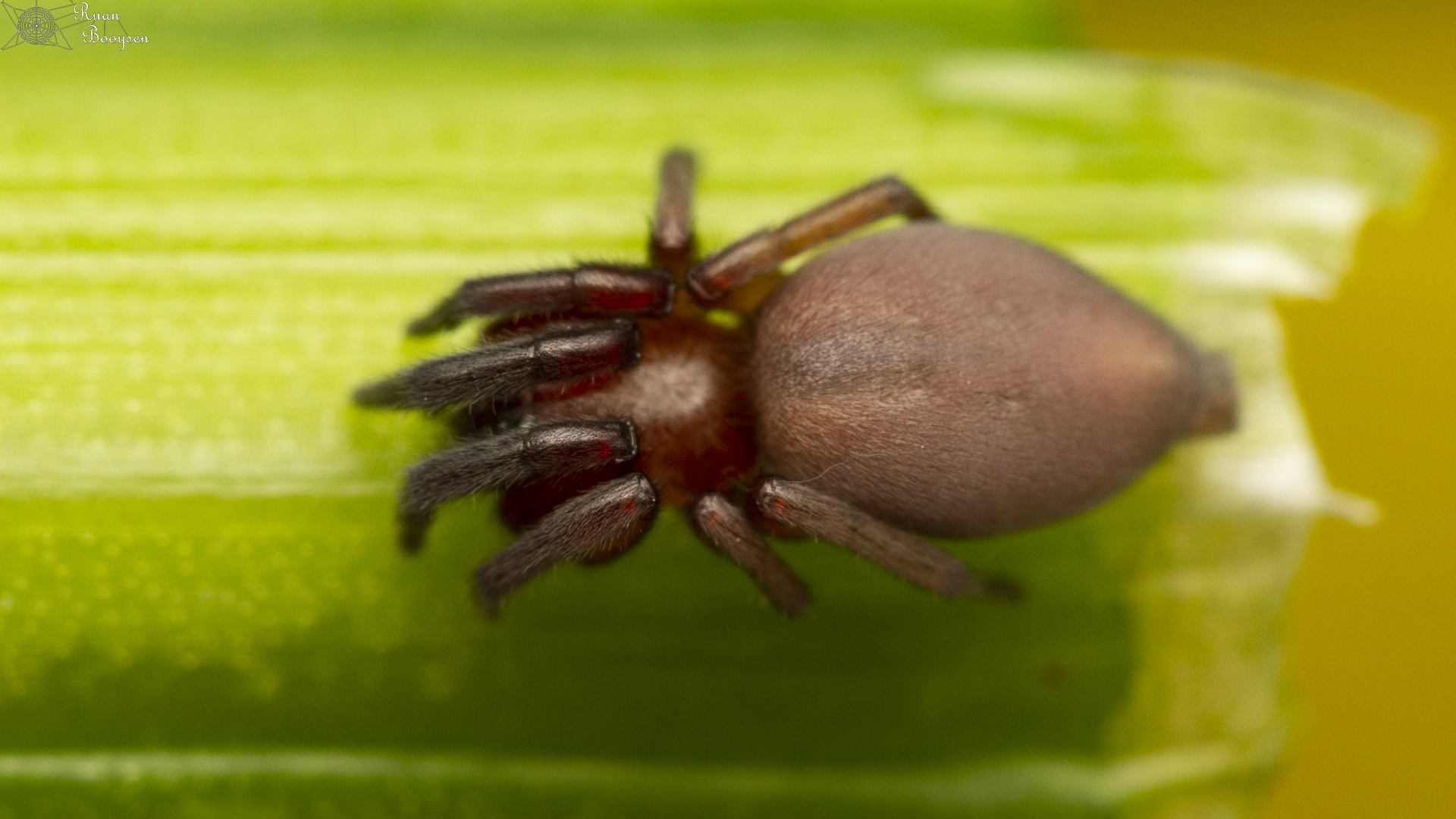

Scientific classification
- Kingdom: Animalia
- Phylum: Arthropoda
- Subphylum: Chelicerata
- Class: Arachnida
- Order: Araneae
- Infraorder: Araneomorphae
- Family: Gnaphosidae
- Genus: Trichothyse
- Species: T. africana

Binomial name
- Trichothyse africana (Tucker, 1923)

Synonyms
- Latonigena africana Tucker, 1923

= Trichothyse africana =

Matroosberg Trichothyse Ground Spider

Species of spider

Trichothyse africana is a spider species in the family Gnaphosidae. It occurs in southern Africa and is commonly known as the Matroosberg Trichothyse ground spider.

== Distribution ==
Trichothyse africana is found in Mozambique and South Africa. In South Africa, it occurs across seven provinces: Eastern Cape, Free State, Gauteng, KwaZulu-Natal, North West, Northern Cape, and Western Cape. The species has a wide distribution from the Matroosberg Mountains near Ceres (the type locality) to various locations across the country. It occurs at altitudes ranging from 19 to 1,816 m above sea level.

== Habitat and ecology ==
The species is a free-living ground dweller found in Fynbos, Grassland, and Savanna biomes. At Ndumo Game Reserve, specimens have been collected using canopy fogging of Pappea capensis trees at 6 m height, indicating some arboreal activity.

== Description ==
Females have a yellowish brown carapace clothed with sparse dark hairs. The legs are slightly lighter than the carapace and darker distally, especially in the anterior legs. The abdomen is uniform dull testaceous. The anterior row of eyes appears straight to recurved when viewed from the front, with median eyes much larger than the laterals and closer to them than to each other. Total length is 7.5 mm.

== Conservation ==
Trichothyse africana is listed as Least Concern by the South African National Biodiversity Institute due to its wide range across multiple countries and provinces. The species is protected in nine protected areas.

== Taxonomy ==
The species was originally described by Tucker in 1923 as Latonigena africana from the Matroosberg Mountains near Ceres. It was later transferred to Trichothyse by Ott, Rodrigues & Brescovit in 2012.Recent work by Sankaran, Haddad & Tripathi in 2025 suggests it may be misplaced in this genus and belongs to the "Echemus group".
