= Phoberus =

Scientific classification
- Domain: Eukaryota
- Kingdom: Animalia
- Phylum: Arthropoda
- Class: Insecta
- Order: Coleoptera
- Suborder: Polyphaga
- Infraorder: Scarabaeiformia
- Family: Trogidae
- Subfamily: Troginae
- Genus: Phoberus; MacLeay, 1819

Synonyms
- Madagatrox Pittino, 2010

Genus of beetles

Phoberus is a genus of hide beetle in the subfamily Troginae. It was initially a subgenus of Trox before taxonomists reorganized it into its own genus. The genus is monophyletic, with all species evolved from a single common ancestor. Most beetle species in the genus live in Africa.

It contains the following species:

- Phoberus aculeatus (Harold, 1872)
- Phoberus arcuatus (Haaf, 1953)
- Phoberus braacki (Scholtz, 1980)
- Phoberus brincki (Haaf, 1958)
- Phoberus bulirschi (Huchet, 2020)
- Phoberus caffer (Harold, 1872)
- Phoberus capensis (Scholtz, 1979)
- Phoberus consimilis (Haaf, 1953)
- Phoberus cyrtus (Haaf, 1953)
- Phoberus disjunctus (Strümpher, 2016)
- Phoberus elmariae (van der Merwe & Scholtz, 2005)
- Phoberus fascicularis (Wiedemann, 1821)
- Phoberus fumarius (Haaf, 1953)
- Phoberus gunki (Scholtz, 1980)
- Phoberus herminae (Strümpher, 2016)
- Phoberus horridus (Fabricius, 1775)
- Phoberus levis (Haaf, 1953)
- Phoberus lilianae (Scholtz, 1980)
- Phoberus luridus (Fabricius, 1781)
- Phoberus miliarius (Gmelin, 1790)
- Phoberus montanus (Kolbe, 1891)
- Phoberus mozalae (Strümpher & Scholtz, 2009)
- Phoberus nama (Kolbe, 1908)
- Phoberus nanniscus (Péringuey, 1901)
- Phoberus nasutus (Harold, 1872)
- Phoberus natalensis (Haaf, 1954)
- Phoberus necopinus (Scholtz, 1986)
- Phoberus ngomensis (van der Merwe & Scholtz, 2005)
- Phoberus nigrociliatus (Kolbe, 1904)
- Phoberus ntlenyanae (Strümpher, 2019)
- Phoberus nyansanus (Haaf, 1953)
- Phoberus nyassicus (Haaf, 1953)
- Phoberus nyikanus (Strümpher, 2017)
- Phoberus penicillatus (Fahraeus, 1857)
- Phoberus perrieri (Fairmaire, 1899)
- Phoberus planicollis (Haaf, 1953)
- Phoberus puncticollis (Haaf, 1953)
- Phoberus pusillus (Péringuey, 1908)
- Phoberus quadricostatus (Scholtz, 1980)
- Phoberus ranotsaraensis (Pittino, 2010)
- Phoberus rhyparoides (Harold, 1872)
- Phoberus rudebecki (Haaf, 1958)
- Phoberus squamiger (Roth, 1851)
- Phoberus sternbergi (van der Merwe & Scholtz, 2005)
- Phoberus strigosus (Haaf, 1953)
- Phoberus sulcatus (Thunberg, 1787)
- Phoberus talpa (Fahraeus, 1857)
- Phoberus youngai (Strümpher & Scholtz, 2011)
