= Phoberus fascicularis =

Scientific classification
- Domain: Eukaryota
- Kingdom: Animalia
- Phylum: Arthropoda
- Class: Insecta
- Order: Coleoptera
- Suborder: Polyphaga
- Infraorder: Scarabaeiformia
- Family: Trogidae
- Subfamily: Troginae
- Genus: Phoberus
- Species: P. fascicularis

Binomial name
- Phoberus fascicularis Wiedemann, 1821

Species of beetle

Phoberus fascicularis is a species of hide beetle in the subfamily Troginae.
