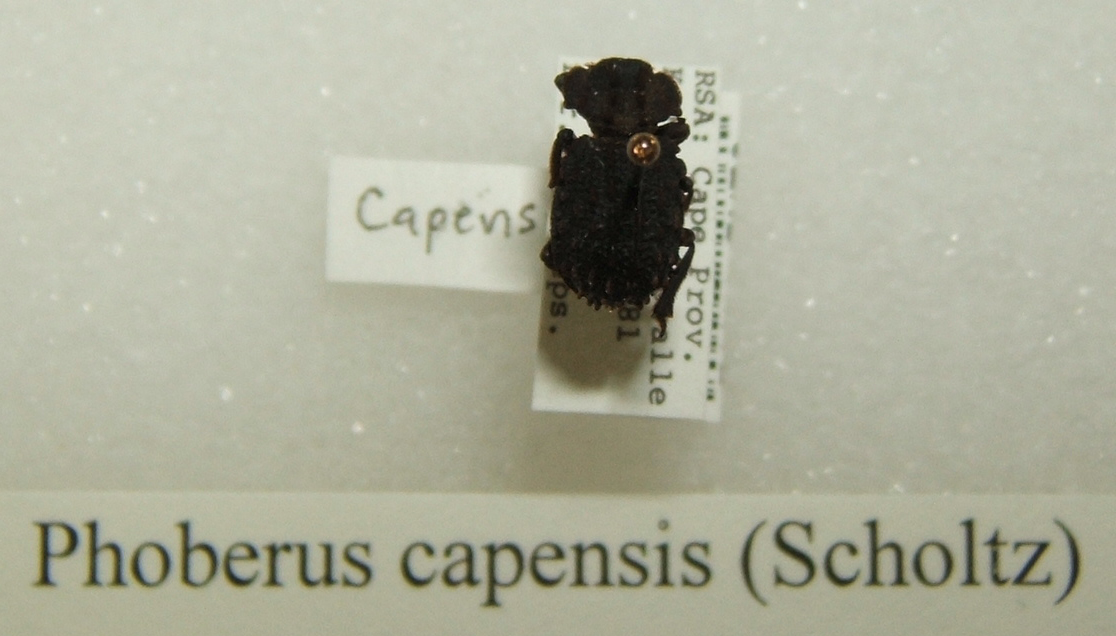
- Phoberus capensis, adult

Scientific classification
- Domain: Eukaryota
- Kingdom: Animalia
- Phylum: Arthropoda
- Class: Insecta
- Order: Coleoptera
- Suborder: Polyphaga
- Infraorder: Scarabaeiformia
- Family: Trogidae
- Subfamily: Troginae
- Genus: Phoberus
- Species: P. capensis

Binomial name
- Phoberus capensis Scholtz, 1979

= Phoberus capensis =

Species of beetle

Phoberus capensis is a beetle of the family Trogidae.
