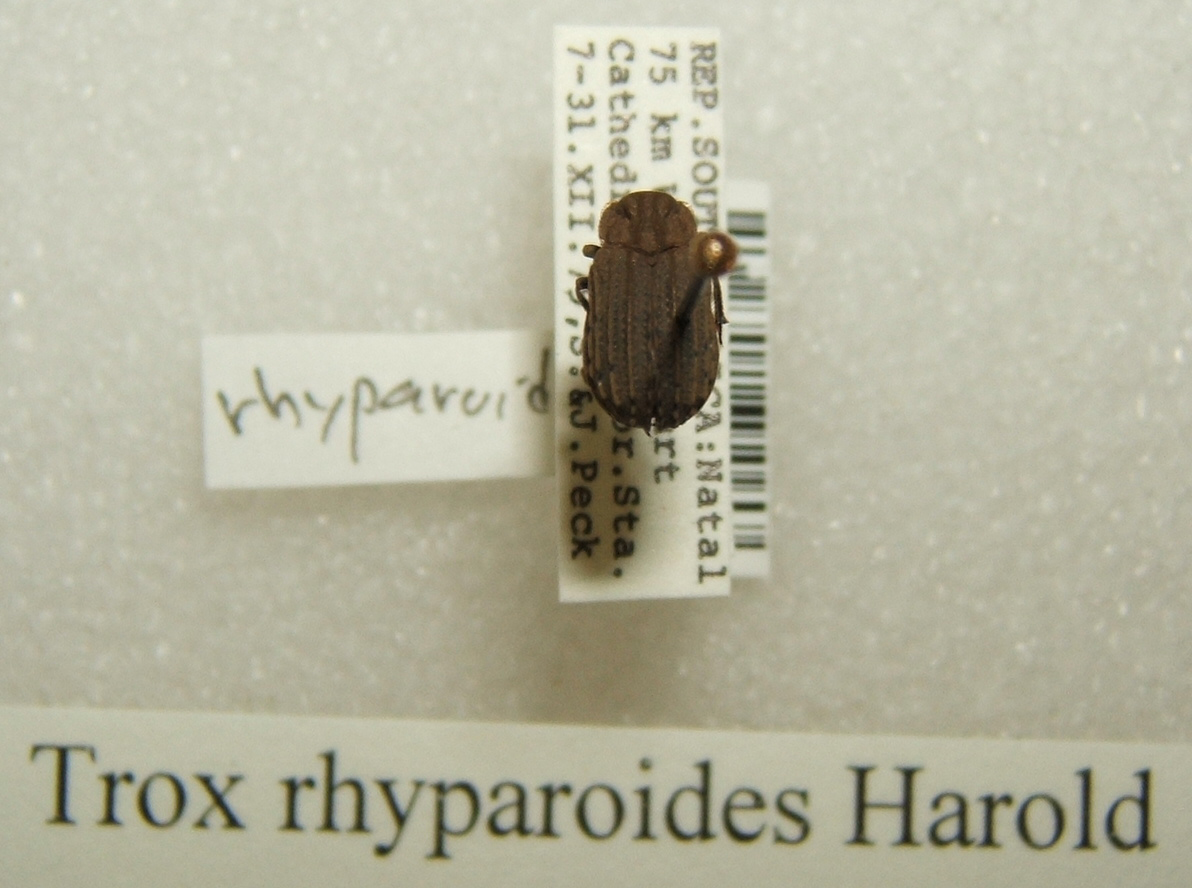
- Phoberus rhyparoides, adult

Scientific classification
- Kingdom: Animalia
- Phylum: Arthropoda
- Class: Insecta
- Order: Coleoptera
- Suborder: Polyphaga
- Infraorder: Scarabaeiformia
- Family: Trogidae
- Genus: Phoberus
- Species: P. rhyparoides

Binomial name
- Phoberus rhyparoides Harold, 1872

= Phoberus rhyparoides =

Species of beetle

Phoberus rhyparoides is a beetle of the family Trogidae.
