= Phoberus sternbergi =

Scientific classification
- Kingdom: Animalia
- Phylum: Arthropoda
- Clade: Pancrustacea
- Class: Insecta
- Order: Coleoptera
- Suborder: Polyphaga
- Infraorder: Scarabaeiformia
- Family: Trogidae
- Genus: Phoberus
- Species: P. sternbergi

Binomial name
- Phoberus sternbergi van der Merwe & Scholtz, 2005

Species of beetle

Phoberus sternbergi is a species of hide beetle in the subfamily Troginae discovered by the scientists van de Merwe and Scholtz in 2005. Like with many other beetle species, P. sternbergi has not been observed again after its discovery, so all knowledge of the species comes from the 8 individual beetles van de Merwe and Scholtz saw during fieldwork.

== Taxonomy ==
Taxonomically, P. sternbergi was initially placed in the subgenus Trox (Phoberus); when Phoberus was recognized as a full genus, taxonomists moved P. sternbergi from the genus Trox to the genus Phoberus. Within the genus Phoberus, P. sternbergi is most similar to P. ngomensis; in fact, females of the two species are almost completely identical, and only the shape of the hide beetles' male genitalia can reliably distinguish the two species. Specifically, in P. sternbergi, the anterior edges of male genitalia's median lobe are M-shaped, while in P. ngomensis those same edges are U-shaped. Furthermore, the parameres of P. sternbergi are longer relative to their penis-like aedeagus than those of P. ngomensis; P. sternbergi's parameres are one-third their aedeagus' length, while the parameres of P. ngomensis are one-fourth that length.

== Morphology ==
Phoberus sternbergi is between 5.5 and 6.5 millimeters long and 3.2 and 3.6 millimeters wide. The elytra, or forewings, of the beetle have flattened sides and are fringed laterally with short hair-like setae. Like other hide beetles, this species' elytra are covered under hard carapaces; P. sternbergi's exoskeleton shell on the abdomen is dark red and bumpy, with orange spikes. These spikes measure under half a millimeter in height. This hide beetle species' exoskeleton on the head and pronotum is a dark leather-black.

P. sternbergi has a triangular clypeus, which refers to the shape of the exoskeleton plate covering its head. The beetles' heads also finish at a pointed apex.

== Distribution and Diet ==
P. sternbergi lives within the South African province of KwaZulu-Natal. A ground-based beetle, the species is a detritivore that probably consumes keratin from rotting meat, as the researchers captured specimen through ten-days-old meat bait.
