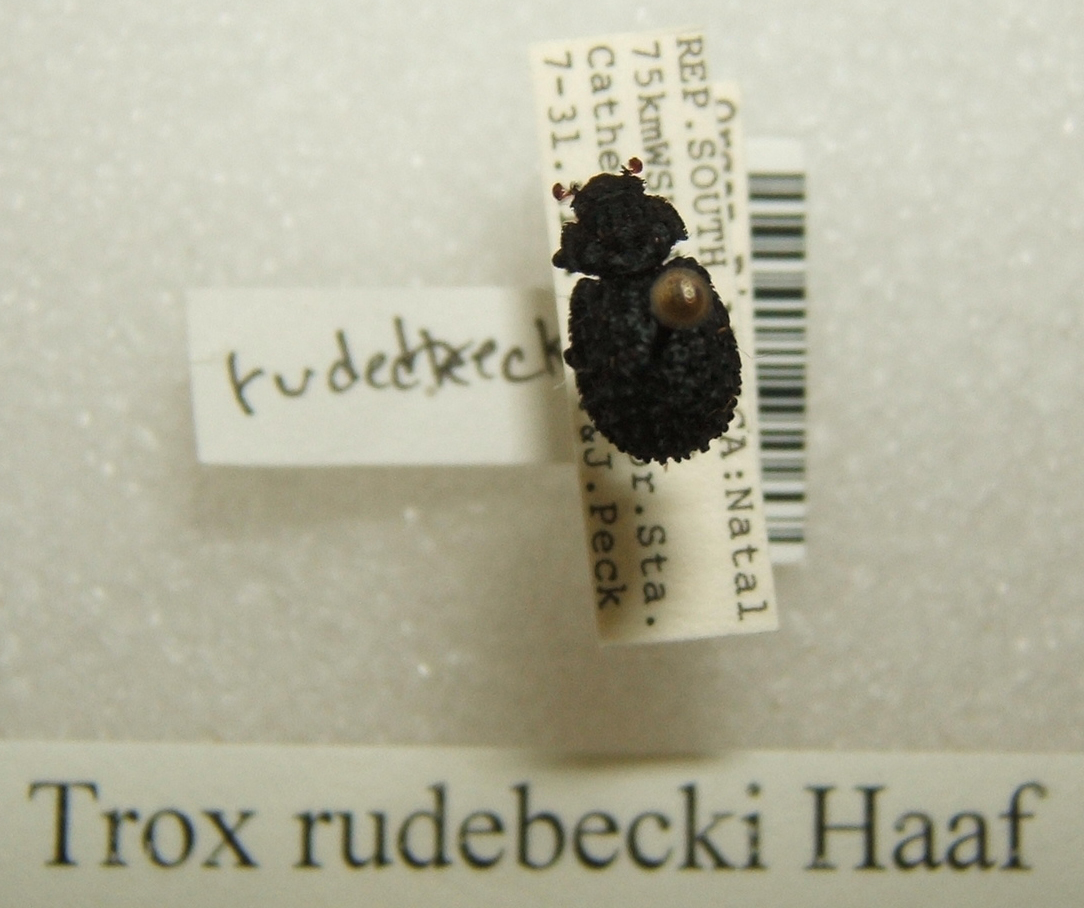
- Phoberus rudebecki, adult

Scientific classification
- Kingdom: Animalia
- Phylum: Arthropoda
- Class: Insecta
- Order: Coleoptera
- Suborder: Polyphaga
- Infraorder: Scarabaeiformia
- Family: Trogidae
- Genus: Phoberus
- Species: P. rudebecki

Binomial name
- Phoberus rudebecki Haaf, 1958

= Phoberus rudebecki =

Species of beetle

Phoberus rudebecki is a beetle of the family Trogidae.
