= Phoberus fumarius =

Scientific classification
- Domain: Eukaryota
- Kingdom: Animalia
- Phylum: Arthropoda
- Class: Insecta
- Order: Coleoptera
- Suborder: Polyphaga
- Infraorder: Scarabaeiformia
- Family: Trogidae
- Subfamily: Troginae
- Genus: Phoberus
- Species: P. fumarius

Binomial name
- Phoberus fumarius (Haaf, 1953)

Species of beetle

Phoberus fumarius is a species of hide beetle in the subfamily Troginae discovered by Erwin Haaf in 1953.

== Taxonomy ==
Taxonomically, P. fumarius was initially placed in the subgenus Trox (Phoberus). Because P. fumarius is extremely similar to Phoberus cyrtus, and because P. fumarius was described from only 4 individual beetles, the scientific community treated P. fumarius as a synonym of P. cyrtus. When Phoberus was recognized as a full genus, taxonomists moved P. cyrtus, and the synonym P. fumarius along with it, from the genus Trox to the genus Phoberus. Cutting-edge beetle cleaning techniques allowed coleopterologists Strümpher and Stals to discern important anatomical differences between P. fumarius and P. cyrtus, reinstating the former as a distinct species.

Within the genus, P. fumarius is most similar to P. cyrtus and P. sulcatus, and researchers have often confused the three species for each other. Carefully inspecting the hide beetles' male genitalia suffices to distinguish the three species. The male genitalia of P. fumarius male genitalia finish at a rounded apex and have broad median lobes, while the male genitalia of P. cyrtus have narrow median lobes that finish at an angular apex. Furthermore, the median lobe of P. sulcatus is divided into two curved sublobes, a feature found in neither P. fumarius nor P. cyrtus.

== Morphology ==
Phoberus fumarius is between 13 and 14 millimeters long and 6 and 8 millimeters wide. The elytra, or forewings, of the beetle are fringed laterally with short hair-like setae. Like other hide beetles, this species' elytra are covered under hard carapaces; P. fumarius' exoskeleton on both the elytra and the pronotum is a darkish matt black, with clumps of setae tufts protruding almost like spikes from the carapace. These tufts range in color from an amberish yellow-brown to light rust-brown, and measure less than half a millimeter in height.

P. fumarius has a triangular clypeus, which refers to the shape of the exoskeleton plate covering its head. The beetles' heads also finish at a rounded apex.

P. fumarius has especially long parameres that equal their penis-like aedeagus's length.

== Distribution and Diet ==
P. fumarius lives within the South African provinces of Eastern Cape, Northern Cape, and Western Cape. Its known geographic distribution follows the Cape Fold Mountains, a pattern of range seen across many beetle groups in South Africa. It may also be present in Namibia. A versatile species, the beetle has been found at elevations between sea level and 2,000 meters above sea level. Phoberus fumarius does depend heavily on rainfall patterns, and its range is restricted to winter rainfall regions, where it rains primarily during winter months.

This ground-based beetle is a detritivore and survives by consuming keratin from shed, excreted, or rotting animal material.
