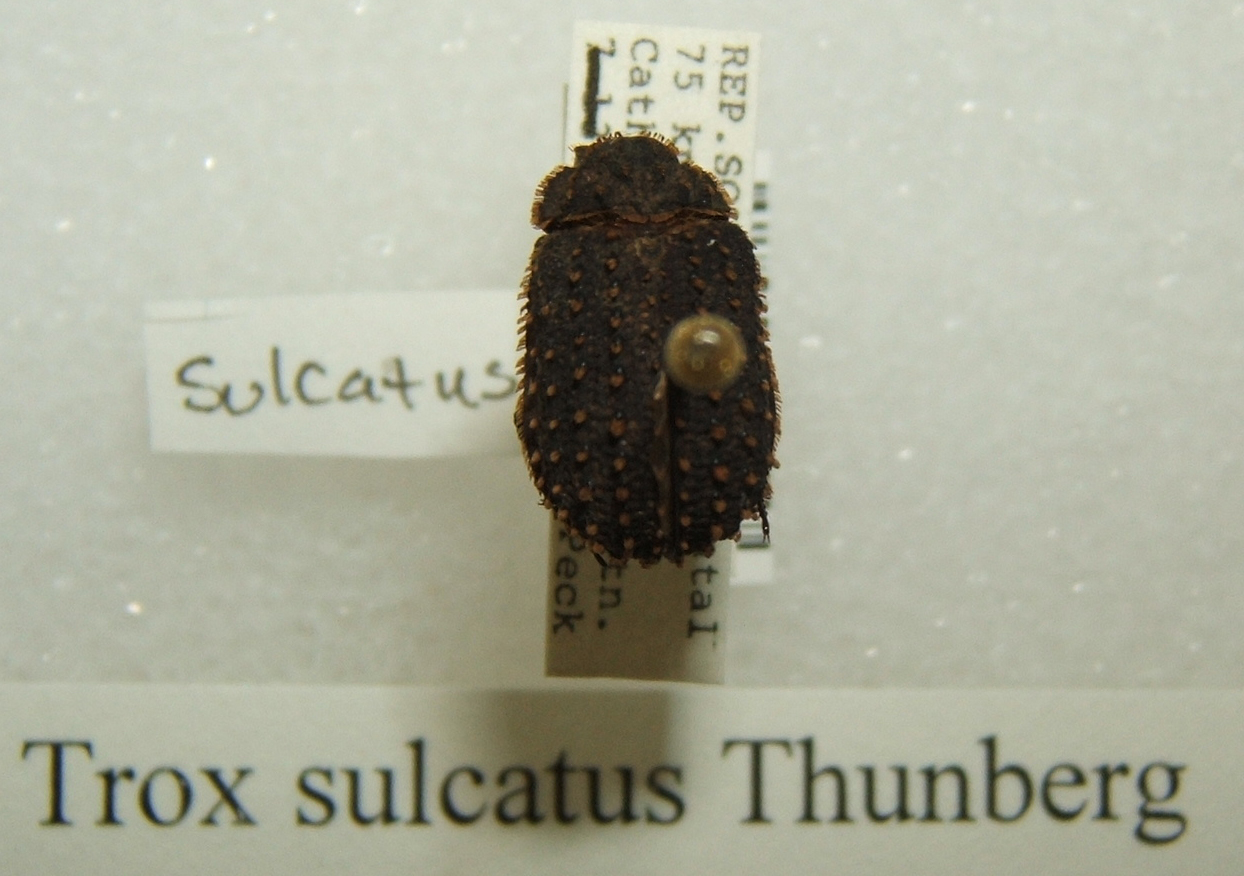
- Phoberus sulcatus, adult

Scientific classification
- Kingdom: Animalia
- Phylum: Arthropoda
- Clade: Pancrustacea
- Class: Insecta
- Order: Coleoptera
- Suborder: Polyphaga
- Infraorder: Scarabaeiformia
- Family: Trogidae
- Genus: Phoberus
- Species: P. sulcatus

Binomial name
- Phoberus sulcatus Thunberg, 1787

= Phoberus sulcatus =

Species of beetle

Phoberus sulcatus is a beetle of the family Trogidae.
