= Phoberus ngomensis =

Scientific classification
- Kingdom: Animalia
- Phylum: Arthropoda
- Clade: Pancrustacea
- Class: Insecta
- Order: Coleoptera
- Suborder: Polyphaga
- Infraorder: Scarabaeiformia
- Family: Trogidae
- Genus: Phoberus
- Species: P. ngomensis

Binomial name
- Phoberus ngomensis van der Merwe & Scholtz, 2005

Species of beetle

Phoberus ngomensis is a species of hide beetle in the subfamily Troginae discovered by the scientists van de Merwe and Scholtz in 2005. Like with many other beetle species, P. ngomensis has not been observed again after its discovery, so all knowledge of the species comes from the 166 individual beetles van de Merwe and Scholtz saw during fieldwork.

== Taxonomy ==
Taxonomically, P. ngomensis was initially placed in the subgenus Trox (Phoberus); when Phoberus was recognized as a full genus, taxonomists moved P. ngomensis from the genus Trox to the genus Phoberus. Within the genus Phoberus, P. ngomensis is most similar to P. sternbergi; in fact, females of the two species are almost completely identical, and only the shape of the hide beetles' male genitalia can reliably distinguish the two species. Specifically, in P. ngomensis, the anterior edges of the male genitalia's median lobe are U-shaped, while in P. sternbergi, the anterior edges of male genitalia's median lobe are M-shaped. Furthermore, the parameres of P. ngomensis are shorter relative to their penis-like aedeagus than those of P. sternbergi; P. ngomensis's parameres are one-fourth their aedeagus' length, while the parameres of P. ngomensis are one-third that length.

== Morphology ==
Phoberus ngomensis is between 5.5 and 6.5 millimeters long and 3.0 and 3.5 millimeters wide. The elytra, or forewings, of the beetle have flattened sides and are fringed laterally with short hair-like setae. Like other hide beetles, this species' elytra are covered under hard carapaces; P. ngomensis's exoskeleton shell on the abdomen is dark red and bumpy, with irregular clumps of light, bright orange setae tufts protruding almost like spikes from the carapace. These spikes measure under half a millimeter in height. This hide beetle species' exoskeleton on the head and pronotum is a dark leather-black. Setae on the head and pronotum are a darker shade of orange.

P. ngomensis has a triangular clypeus, which refers to the shape of the exoskeleton plate covering its head. The beetles' heads also finish at a pointed apex.

== Distribution and Diet ==
P. ngomensis lives in dense, high-altitude forests within the South African province of KwaZulu-Natal. It is found year-round between 1000 meters and 1140 meters above sea level. A ground-based beetle, pitfall traps are most effective in capturing specimen.
