= Phoberus arcuatus =

Scientific classification
- Domain: Eukaryota
- Kingdom: Animalia
- Phylum: Arthropoda
- Class: Insecta
- Order: Coleoptera
- Suborder: Polyphaga
- Infraorder: Scarabaeiformia
- Family: Trogidae
- Subfamily: Troginae
- Genus: Phoberus
- Species: P. arcuatus

Binomial name
- Phoberus arcuatus Haaf, 1953

Species of beetle

Phoberus arcuatus is a species of hide beetle in the subfamily Troginae.
