= Trichothyse zuluensis =

Nkandla Mouse Ground Spider

Scientific classification
- Kingdom: Animalia
- Phylum: Arthropoda
- Subphylum: Chelicerata
- Class: Arachnida
- Order: Araneae
- Infraorder: Araneomorphae
- Family: Gnaphosidae
- Genus: Trichothyse
- Species: T. zuluensis

Binomial name
- Trichothyse zuluensis (Lawrence, 1938)

Synonyms
- Xerophaeus zuluensis Lawrence, 1938

Species of spider

Trichothyse zuluensis is a species of spider in the family Gnaphosidae. It occurs in southern Africa and is commonly known as the Nkandla mouse ground spider.

== Distribution ==
Trichothyse zuluensis is recorded from Lesotho, Namibia, and South Africa. In South Africa, it is known from two provinces, KwaZulu-Natal and the Western Cape.

== Habitat and ecology ==
The species inhabits multiple biomes including Forest, Nama Karoo, and Savanna biomes at altitudes ranging from 38 to 1706 m above sea level. Trichothyse zuluensis are free-living ground dwellers.

== Conservation ==
Trichothyse zuluensis is listed as Least Concern by the South African National Biodiversity Institute due to its wide geographic range. The species is protected in Ndumo Game Reserve and Nkandhla Forest and there are no significant threats.

== Taxonomy ==
The species was originally described by R. F. Lawrence in 1938 as Xerophaeus zuluensis from Nkandhla Forest. In 2025, Sankaran, Haddad & Tripathi transferred the species to the genus Trichothyse and provided the first description of the male.
