= Phoberus herminae =

Scientific classification
- Domain: Eukaryota
- Kingdom: Animalia
- Phylum: Arthropoda
- Class: Insecta
- Order: Coleoptera
- Suborder: Polyphaga
- Infraorder: Scarabaeiformia
- Family: Trogidae
- Subfamily: Troginae
- Genus: Phoberus
- Species: P. herminae

Binomial name
- Phoberus herminae Strümpher, 2016

Species of beetle

Phoberus herminae is a species of hide beetle in the subfamily Troginae discovered by coleopterologist Werner P. Strümpher in 2016.

== Taxonomy ==
Initially, the scientific community treated all P. herminae specimens as part of the P. capensis species. These beetle specimen resided within the genus Trox. When Phoberus was recognized as a full genus, taxonomists moved P. capensis, and all P. herminae beetles along with it, from the genus Trox to the genus Phoberus. Recent evolutionary genetics allowed coleopterologist Strümpher and his team to uncover molecular and morphological differences between mainline P. capensis beetles and the P. herminae variant, causing the new Phoberus herminae species to be discovered and classified.

Within the genus Phoberus, P. herminae is most similar to P. capensis and P. disjunctus due to their shared evolutionary history, and historically researchers have often confused the three species for each other. P. herminae is extremely similar to P. capensis, and females of the two species are practically indistinguishable; indeed, morphologically, only the shape of the parameres and median lobes in male genitalia can distinguish the two species. P. herminae has more apparent differences to P. disjunctus. P. herminae has a high disc on the pronotum, whose margins spike out from the beetle's carapace, and a deep valley-like depression runs through the disc's middle; by contrast, P. disjunctus has an evenly-rounded disc on the pronotum with a shallow depression running through its middle.

== Morphology ==
Phoberus herminae is between 7 and 10 millimeters long and 4 and 6 millimeters wide. The hide beetle species has symmetrical, curved parameres that are about two-thirds as long as their penis-like aedeagus.

== Distribution and diet ==
P. herminae lives in forests within the South African province of Western Cape. Specifically, the species is scattered across the coast and the Tsitsikama, Langeberg, and Outeniqua Mountains.

This ground-based beetle is a detritivore and survives by consuming keratin from animal feces and rotting meat.

== Evolutionary history ==
P. herminae, along with P. capensis and P. disjunctus, form the "capensis" node of the genus Phoberus. The three species all came from Phoberus capensis. At least four million years ago, P. capensis diverged from its closest relative outside the capensis node, P. nasutus. Then, sometime in the Pliocene or early Pleistocene, P. capensis diversified, with fragment populations splitting off and evolving into two new species.

Rapid climate changes leading up to the ice ages likely prompted this evolution, as they affected hide beetle populations unequally. In most South African ecosystems, P. capensis populations plummeted. However, the Cape Fold Mountains contain a patchwork of forests, coastal plains, and mountain summits that are relatively cold, temperate, and much more stable than the surrounding ecosystems, serving as a buffer that shielded P. capensis populations within them. In the forests, ancestors of P. capensis and P. herminae continued to co-evolve for some time; eventually, the ancestors of P. herminae were isolated from P. capensis groups that had taken refuge in other dwindling patchwork biomes, leading to allopatric speciation (evolution from geographic separation).
