= Phoberus cyrtus =

Scientific classification
- Domain: Eukaryota
- Kingdom: Animalia
- Phylum: Arthropoda
- Class: Insecta
- Order: Coleoptera
- Suborder: Polyphaga
- Infraorder: Scarabaeiformia
- Family: Trogidae
- Subfamily: Troginae
- Genus: Phoberus
- Species: P. cyrtus

Binomial name
- Phoberus cyrtus Haaf, 1953

Species of beetle

Phoberus cyrtus is a species of hide beetle in the subfamily Troginae discovered by Erwin Haaf in 1953.

== Taxonomy ==
Taxonomically, P. cyrtus was initially placed in the subgenus Trox (Phoberus). When Phoberus was elevated to a full genus, taxonomists moved P. cyrtus from the genus Trox to the genus Phoberus.

Within the genus Phoberus, P. cyrtus is most similar to P. fumarius and P. sulcatus, and researchers have often confused the three hide beetle species for each other. Carefully inspecting the hide beetles' male genitalia suffices to distinguish the three species. The male genitalia of P. cyrtus have narrow median lobes that finish at an angular apex, while those of P. fumarius have broad median lobes finishing at a rounded apex. Furthermore, the median lobe of P. sulcatus is divided into two curved sublobes, a feature found in neither P. cyrtus nor P. fumarius.

== Morphology ==
Phoberus cyrtus is between 9 and 13 millimeters long and 5 and 8 millimeters wide. The elytra, or forewings, of the beetle are fringed laterally with long hair-like setae that angle backwards, away from the hide beetle's head. Like other hide beetles, this species' elytra are covered under hard carapaces; P. cyrtus' exoskeleton on both the elytra and the pronotum is a darkish matt black, with clumps of setae tufts protruding almost like spikes from the carapace. These tufts are yellow and measure less than half a millimeter in height. As one moves towards the beetle's head, the setae change color; setae on the head are long and light brown, and setae ranging from dark yellow to bright red and rust-brown fringe the mouth of P. cyrtus.

P. cyrtus has a triangular clypeus, which refers to the shape of the exoskeleton plate covering its head. The beetles' heads also finish at a rounded apex.

P. cyrtus has especially long parameres that are only slightly shorter than their penis-like aedeagus's length. Male P. cyrtus beetles have two bladelike protrusions and rows of hooks between their genitalia's median lobes and parameres, which enable them to more effectively grasp onto and copulate with females.

== Distribution and Diet ==
P. cyrtus lives within Lesotho, southern Botswana, and the South African provinces of Eastern Cape, KwaZulu-Natal, Mpumalanga, and North West. A versatile species, the beetle thrives in both grasslands, marked by moderately cold temperature and moderately frequent precipitation, and in savannahs, which are hot and have protracted dry periods. Still, Phoberus cyrtus depends heavily on rainfall patterns, and its range is restricted to summer rainfall regions, where it rains primarily during summer months.

This ground-based beetle is a detritivore and survives by consuming keratin from shed, excreted, or rotting animal material.
