= Trichothyse hortensis =

Namibia Trichothyse Ground Spider

Conservation status
- Least Concern (SANBI Red List)

Scientific classification
- Kingdom: Animalia
- Phylum: Arthropoda
- Subphylum: Chelicerata
- Class: Arachnida
- Order: Araneae
- Infraorder: Araneomorphae
- Family: Gnaphosidae
- Genus: Trichothyse
- Species: T. hortensis

Binomial name
- Trichothyse hortensis Tucker, 1923

Species of spider

Trichothyse hortensis is a spider species in the family Gnaphosidae. It occurs in southern Africa and is commonly known as the Namibia Trichothyse ground spider. This species is the type species of the genus Trichothyse.

== Distribution ==
Trichothyse hortensis is found in Namibia and South Africa. In South Africa, it occurs in two provinces, Free State and Gauteng. The species occurs at altitudes ranging from 1,218 to 1,375 m above sea level.

== Habitat and ecology ==
The species is a free-living ground dweller found in Grassland, Nama Karoo, and Savanna biomes. It inhabits various protected areas including nature reserves and game reserves.

== Description ==
Females have a medium brown carapace with legs that are slightly lighter in color. The abdomen is dull testaceous, uniformly darkened dorsally and laterally. The sternum is medium brown with pale coxae. Total length is 8.8 mm.

== Conservation ==
Trichothyse hortensis is listed as Least Concern by the South African National Biodiversity Institute due to its wide range across two countries. The species is protected in five protected areas, Tussen die Riviere Nature Reserve, Kalkfontein Dam Nature Reserve, Naval Hill Nature Reserve, Sandveld Nature Reserve, and Amanzi Game Reserve.

== Etymology ==
The species name hortensis is derived from Latin meaning "of the garden" or "cultivated".

== Taxonomy ==
The species was described by Tucker in 1923 from Namibia and serves as the type species for the genus Trichothyse. Murphy provided drawings of the species in 2007, and it was further studied by Sankaran, Haddad & Tripathi in 2025. The species is known only from females.
