= Phoberus elmariae =

Scientific classification
- Domain: Eukaryota
- Kingdom: Animalia
- Phylum: Arthropoda
- Class: Insecta
- Order: Coleoptera
- Suborder: Polyphaga
- Infraorder: Scarabaeiformia
- Family: Trogidae
- Subfamily: Troginae
- Genus: Phoberus
- Species: P. elmariae

Binomial name
- Phoberus elmariae van der Merwe & Scholtz, 2005

Species of beetle

Phoberus elmariae is a species of hide beetle in the subfamily Troginae discovered by the scientists van de Merwe and Scholtz in 2005. Like with many other beetle species, P. elmariae has not been observed again after its discovery, so all knowledge of the species comes from the 16 individual beetles van de Merwe and Scholtz saw during fieldwork.

== Taxonomy ==
Taxonomically, P. elmariae was initially placed in the subgenus Trox (Phoberus); when Phoberus was recognized as a full genus, taxonomists moved P. elmariae from the genus Trox to the genus Phoberus. Within the genus Phoberus, P. elmariae is most similar to P. natalensis and P. quadricostatus; in fact, females of the three species are almost completely identical, and only the shape of their male genitalia can reliably distinguish the three species. Specifically, the parameres of P. elmariae are rounded at their ends, while the other hide beetles' parameres square off at the ends.

== Morphology ==
Phoberus elmariae is between 5.3 and 7.5 millimeters long and 2.8 and 4.0 millimeters wide. The elytra, or forewings, of the beetle have flattened sides and are fringed laterally with short hair-like setae. Like other hide beetles, this species' elytra are covered under hard carapaces; P. elmariae's exoskeleton shell on the abdomen is black and bumpy, with brown and orange spikes.

== Diet and Habitat ==
P. elmariae lives in grassveld within the South African province of KwaZulu-Natal. A ground-based beetle, the species probably eats feces, as the researchers captured specimen through feces bait.
