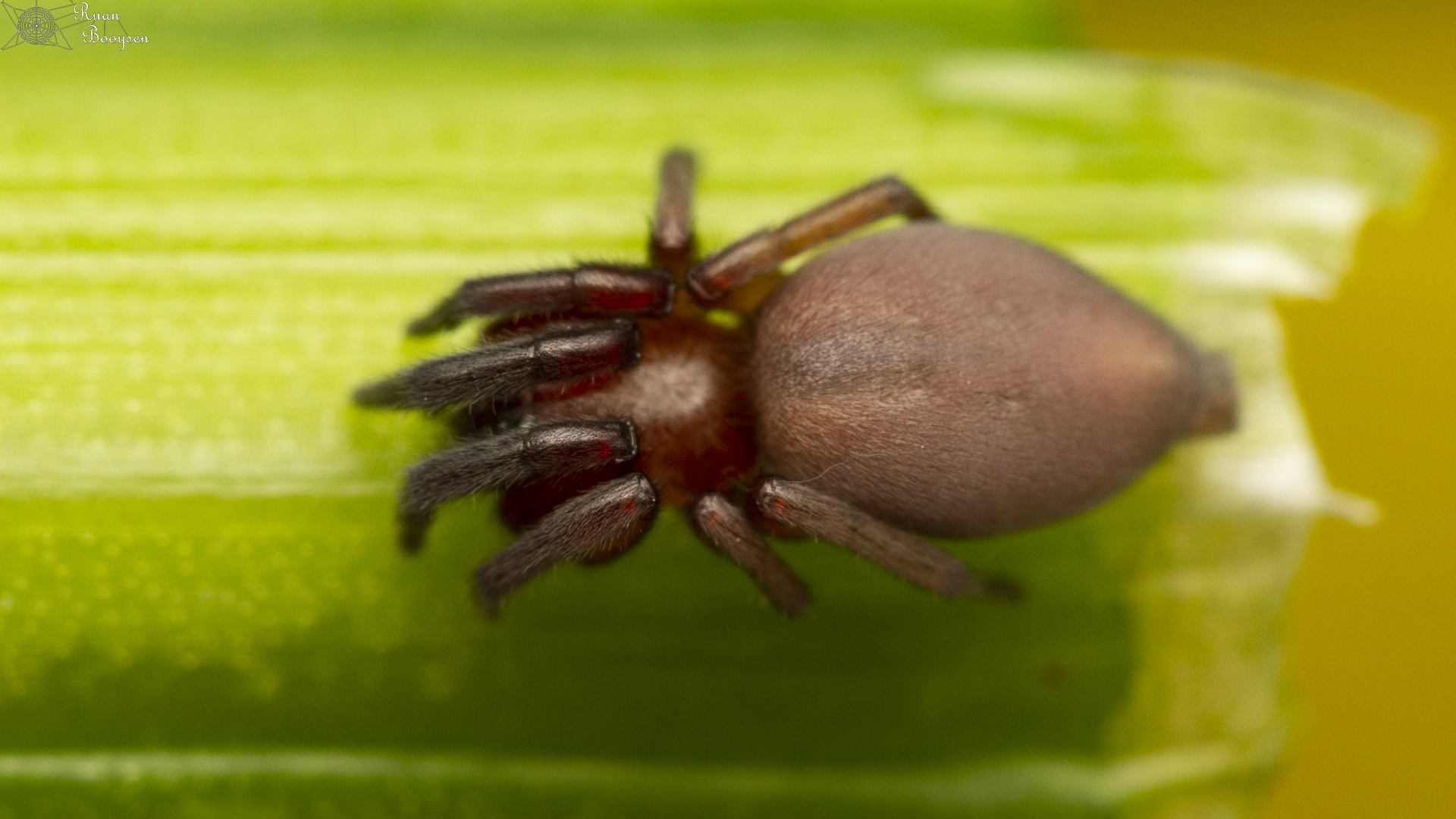

Scientific classification
- Kingdom: Animalia
- Phylum: Arthropoda
- Subphylum: Chelicerata
- Class: Arachnida
- Order: Araneae
- Infraorder: Araneomorphae
- Family: Gnaphosidae
- Genus: Trichothyse; Tucker, 1923

Type species
- T. hortensis Tucker, 1923

Species
- 17, see text

= Trichothyse =

Genus of spiders

Trichothyse is a genus of African ground spiders that was first described by R.W.E. Tucker in 1923.

== Species ==
As of September 2025, this genus includes seventeen species and one subspecies:

- Trichothyse africana (Tucker, 1923) – Mozambique, South Africa
- Trichothyse antineae (Fage, 1929) – Mali
- Trichothyse fontensis Lawrence, 1928 – Namibia, South Africa
- Trichothyse furcata (Simon, 1914) – Spain, France, Italy, Greece
- Trichothyse golan (Levy, 1999) – Israel
- Trichothyse hamipalpis (Kroneberg, 1875) – Iran, Uzbekistan, Tajikistan
- Trichothyse hortensis Tucker, 1923 – Namibia, South Africa (type species)
- Trichothyse ilkerakkusi (Coşar, Danışman & Marusik, 2024) – Turkey
- Trichothyse jodhpurensis (Gajbe, 1993) – India
- Trichothyse karoo Haddad & Sankaran, 2025 – South Africa
- Trichothyse loricata (Kritscher, 1996) – Malta, Italy (Sicily)
- Trichothyse perversa (Simon, 1914) – France
- Trichothyse poonaensis (Tikader, 1982) – Portugal, Spain, Greece, Cyprus, Israel, India
- Trichothyse pugnax (O. Pickard-Cambridge, 1874) – Libya, Egypt, Ethiopia, Israel
- Trichothyse senilis (O. Pickard-Cambridge, 1872) – North Africa, Portugal, Turkmenistan. Introduced to Cape Verde
  - Trichothyse senilis auspex (Simon, 1878) – Spain, France
- Trichothyse subtropica Lawrence, 1927 – Namibia
- Trichothyse zuluensis (Lawrence, 1938) – Namibia, South Africa, Lesotho
