= Matroosberg =

Second tallest mountain in the Western Cape, South Africa

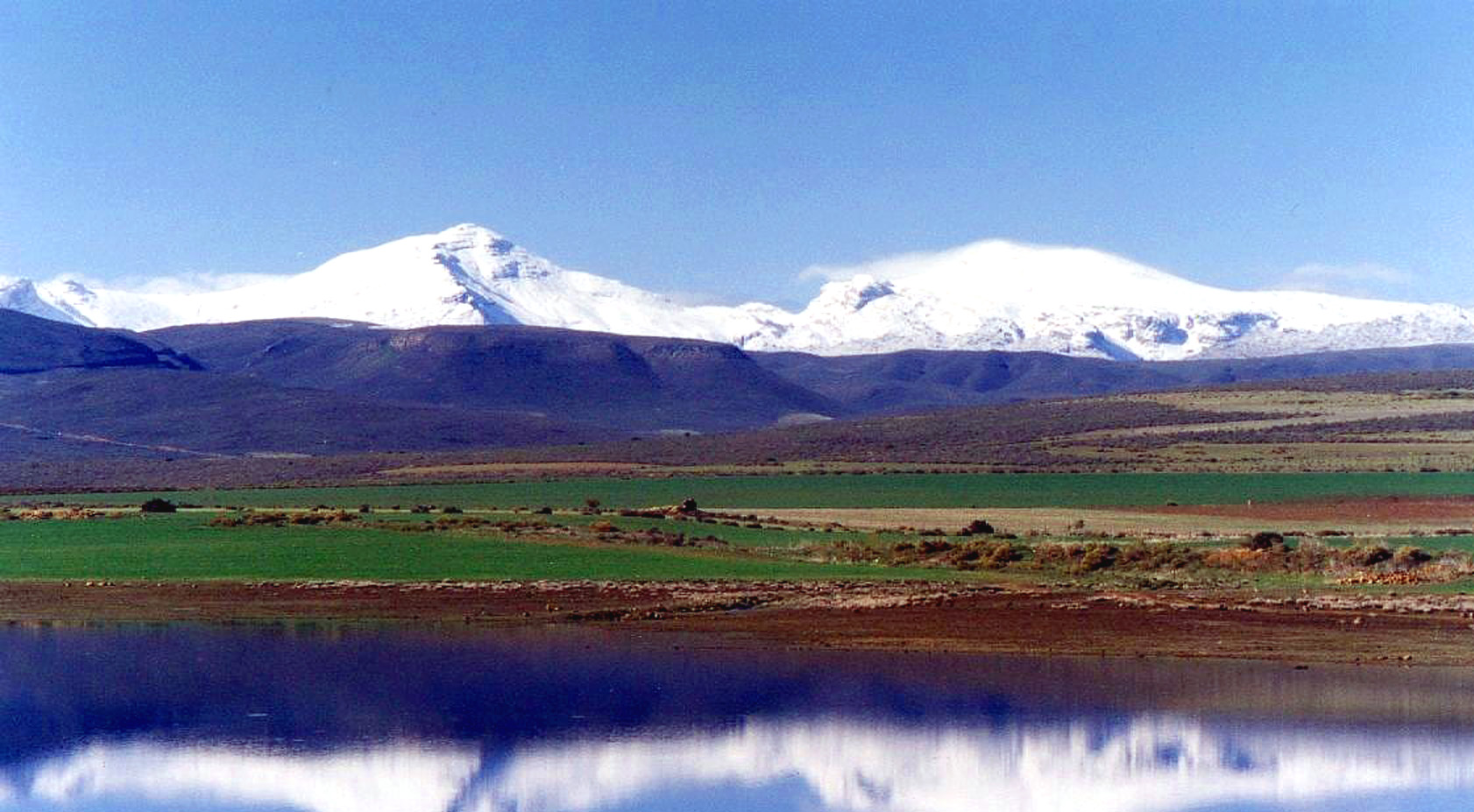
- Hex River Mountains with Matroosberg

Highest point
- Elevation: 2,249 m (7,379 ft)
- Prominence: 1,345 m (4,413 ft)
- Listing: List of mountains in South Africa; Ribu
- Coordinates: 33°22′54″S 19°40′7″E

Geography
- Location within South Africa
- Location: Cape Fold Belt, South Africa
- Parent range: Hex River Mountains

Matroosberg (Afrikaans for 'Sailor Mountain') is a peak in the South African Hex River Mountains, which belong to the Cape Fold Belt. With a height of 2,247 m (7,372 ft) above sea level, it is the highest mountain in the Cape Winelands District Municipality. The mountain is located in the Witzenberg Local Municipality in the Western Cape.

The mountain got its name because a rock formation below the summit is said to resemble a sailor next to their ship when viewed from the south.

Matroosberg is located around 35 km (22 mi) east of Ceres on the east side of the Ceres Valley. The closest town is De Doorns in the south, around eleven kilometers away. The private Matroosberg Nature Reserve is operated on the Erfdeel farm. From there, it is reachable to the summit by four-wheel drive. In winter, the mountain is often covered with snow; There is a small ski area on the north slope, which is the seat of the South African Ski Association.

The longest of the four Hex River Tunnels on the Cape Town–Johannesburg railway line runs below Matroosberg. Matroosberg station is located on the former route over the Hex River Pass and is still used today as the end of special trips.
