= Hex River Mountains =

Mountain range in the Western Cape province of South Africa

- Hexrivierberge
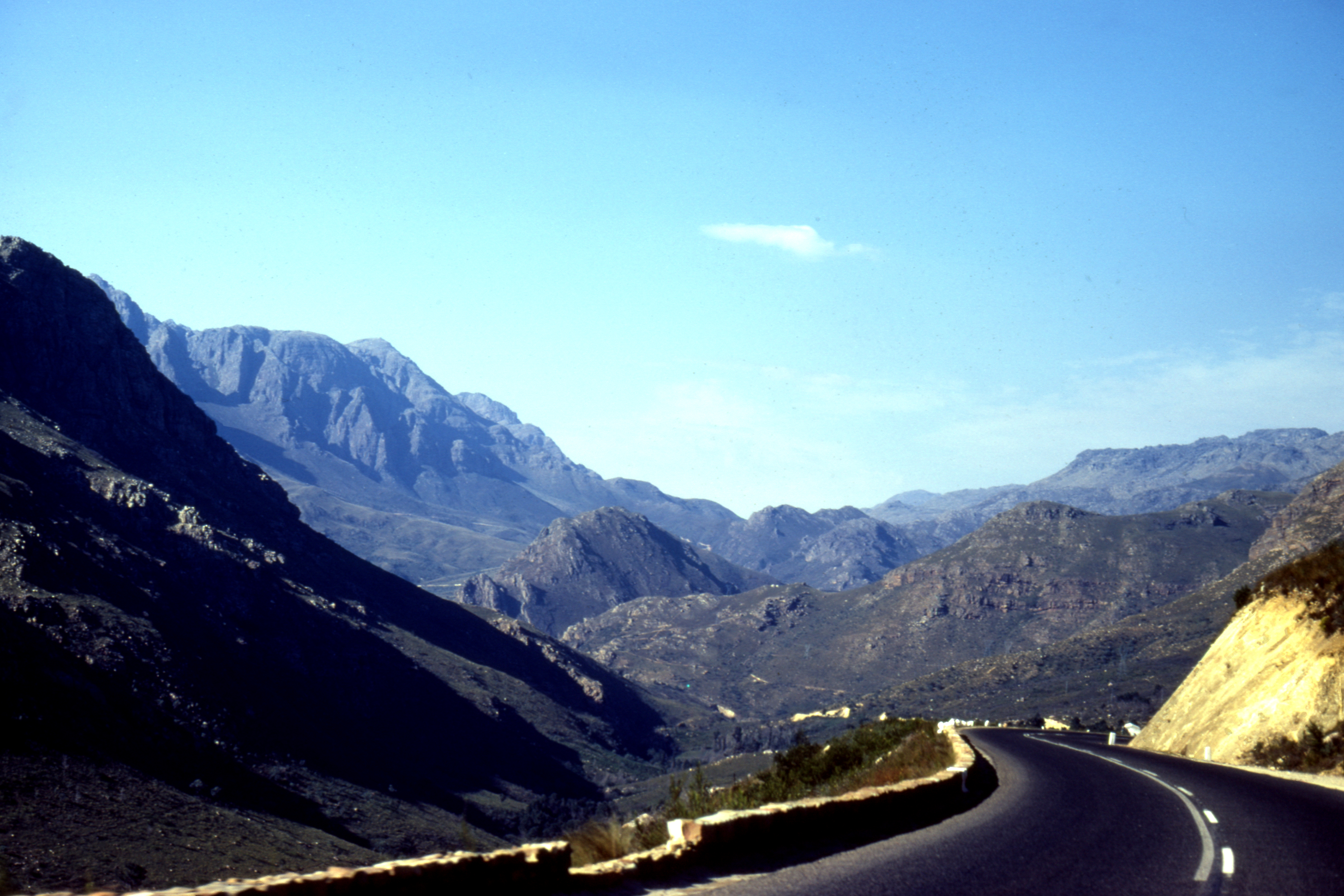

Highest point
- Peak: Matroosberg
- Elevation: 2,249 m (7,379 ft)
- Listing: List of mountain ranges of South Africa
- Coordinates: 33°25′S 19°30′E

Dimensions
- Length: 25 km (16 mi)
- Width: 4 km (2.5 mi)

Geography
- Location within Western Cape

Geology
- Orogeny: Cape Fold Belt

The Hex River Mountains (Afrikaans: Hexrivierberge) make up the second highest mountain range in the Western Cape province of South Africa and are located 120 kilometres (75 miles) north-east of Cape Town. They form part of a large anticline in the Cape Fold Belt mountain system and form a north-east, south-west trending mountain system forming the core of the Cape Syntaxis between the towns of Worcester and De Doorns. They are mostly composed of Table Mountain sandstone with most peaks reaching 2,000 m (6,600 ft) in height or more. The highest mountain is Matroosberg at 2,249 m (7,379 ft), making it the second tallest peak in the province after Seweweekspoort Peak in the Swartberg Mountain Range.

The vegetation is primarily montane fynbos and the mountains fall within the Cape's Mediterranean climate. The mountains provide some rudimentary snow-skiing opportunities in winter, with the Western Cape's heaviest snowfalls occurring in and around these ranges. The surrounding valleys support intensive deciduous fruit cultivation, mostly in the form of cherries and table grapes.

Block streams and terraces found in the near the summit of Matroosberg evidences past periglacial activity, which occurred likely during the Last Glacial Maximum.

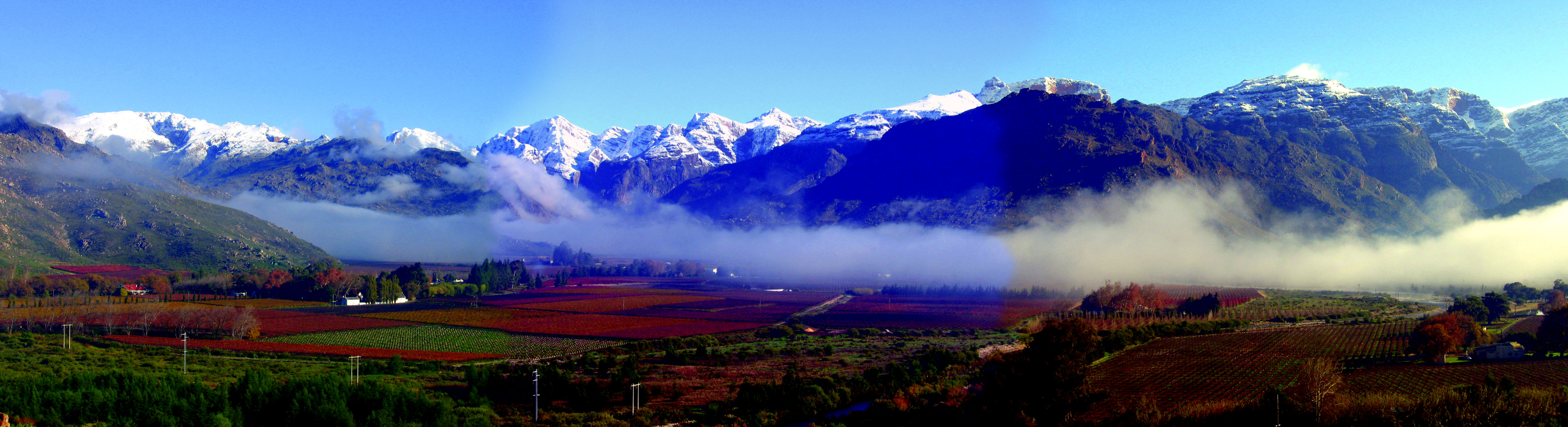
Hex River Mountains, with Buffelshoek Peak (2060 m) and Milner Peak (1995 m).

== See also ==
- Hex River Pass
- Hex River Tunnels
- List of mountain ranges of South Africa – List of mountain ranges
