= Polynoncus aeger =

Scientific classification
- Kingdom: Animalia
- Phylum: Arthropoda
- Clade: Pancrustacea
- Class: Insecta
- Order: Coleoptera
- Suborder: Polyphaga
- Infraorder: Scarabaeiformia
- Family: Trogidae
- Genus: Polynoncus
- Species: P. aeger

Binomial name
- Polynoncus aeger Guerin-Meneville, 1844

Species of beetle

Polynoncus aeger is a species of hide beetle in the subfamily Omorginae.
