= Polynoncus gibberosus =

Scientific classification
- Domain: Eukaryota
- Kingdom: Animalia
- Phylum: Arthropoda
- Class: Insecta
- Order: Coleoptera
- Suborder: Polyphaga
- Infraorder: Scarabaeiformia
- Family: Trogidae
- Genus: Polynoncus
- Species: P. gibberosus

Binomial name
- Polynoncus gibberosus Scholtz, 1990

Species of beetle

Polynoncus gibberosus is a species of hide beetle in the subfamily Omorginae found in Chile.
