= Polynoncus guttifer =

Scientific classification
- Kingdom: Animalia
- Phylum: Arthropoda
- Clade: Pancrustacea
- Class: Insecta
- Order: Coleoptera
- Suborder: Polyphaga
- Infraorder: Scarabaeiformia
- Family: Trogidae
- Genus: Polynoncus
- Species: P. guttifer

Binomial name
- Polynoncus guttifer Harold, 1868

Species of beetle

Polynoncus guttifer is a species of hide beetle in the subfamily Omorginae found in Paraguay, Argentina, and Chile.
