= Polynoncus pilularius =

Scientific classification
- Domain: Eukaryota
- Kingdom: Animalia
- Phylum: Arthropoda
- Class: Insecta
- Order: Coleoptera
- Suborder: Polyphaga
- Infraorder: Scarabaeiformia
- Family: Trogidae
- Genus: Polynoncus
- Species: P. pilularis

Binomial name
- Polynoncus pilularis Germar, 1824

Species of beetle

Polynoncus pilularis is a species of hide beetle in the subfamily Omorginae found in Argentina, Chile, Uruguay, Paraguay, and Brazil.
