= Omorgus mariettae =

Scientific classification
- Kingdom: Animalia
- Phylum: Arthropoda
- Class: Insecta
- Order: Coleoptera
- Suborder: Polyphaga
- Infraorder: Scarabaeiformia
- Family: Trogidae
- Genus: Omorgus
- Species: O. mariettae

Binomial name
- Omorgus mariettae Scholtz, 1986

Species of beetle

Omorgus mariettae is a species of hide beetle in the subfamily Omorginae.
