= Polynoncus sallei =

Scientific classification
- Domain: Eukaryota
- Kingdom: Animalia
- Phylum: Arthropoda
- Class: Insecta
- Order: Coleoptera
- Suborder: Polyphaga
- Infraorder: Scarabaeiformia
- Family: Trogidae
- Genus: Polynoncus
- Species: P. sallei

Binomial name
- Polynoncus sallei Harold, 1872

Species of beetle

Polynoncus sallei is a species of hide beetle in the subfamily Omorginae found in Ecuador, Peru, and Madagascar, making it the only Polynoncus species to live outside of South America.
