= Polynoncus peruanus =

Scientific classification
- Kingdom: Animalia
- Phylum: Arthropoda
- Class: Insecta
- Order: Coleoptera
- Suborder: Polyphaga
- Infraorder: Scarabaeiformia
- Family: Trogidae
- Genus: Polynoncus
- Species: P. peruanus

Binomial name
- Polynoncus peruanus Erichson, 1847

Species of beetle

Polynoncus peruanus is a species of hide beetle in the subfamily Omorginae found in Peru, Argentina, Bolivia, and Chile.
