= Omorgus niloticus =

Scientific classification
- Kingdom: Animalia
- Phylum: Arthropoda
- Class: Insecta
- Order: Coleoptera
- Suborder: Polyphaga
- Infraorder: Scarabaeiformia
- Family: Trogidae
- Genus: Omorgus
- Species: O. niloticus

Binomial name
- Omorgus niloticus Harold, 1872

Species of beetle

Omorgus niloticus is a species of hide beetle in the subfamily Omorginae and subgenus Afromorgus. It is distributed in East Africa, Madagascar, Egypt and the Arabian Peninsula.
