= Polynoncus burmeisteri =

Scientific classification
- Domain: Eukaryota
- Kingdom: Animalia
- Phylum: Arthropoda
- Class: Insecta
- Order: Coleoptera
- Suborder: Polyphaga
- Infraorder: Scarabaeiformia
- Family: Trogidae
- Genus: Polynoncus
- Species: P. burmeisteri

Binomial name
- Polynoncus burmeisteri Pittino, 1987

Species of beetle

Polynoncus burmeisteri is a species of hide beetle in the subfamily Omorginae found in Argentina.
