= Omorgus bayoni =

Scientific classification
- Kingdom: Animalia
- Phylum: Arthropoda
- Class: Insecta
- Order: Coleoptera
- Suborder: Polyphaga
- Infraorder: Scarabaeiformia
- Family: Trogidae
- Genus: Omorgus
- Species: O. bayoni

Binomial name
- Omorgus bayoni Pittino, 2011

Synonyms
- Omorgus (Afromorgus) bayoni Pittino, 2011

Species of beetle

Omorgus bayoni is a species of hide beetle in the subfamily Omorginae and subgenus Afromorgus.
