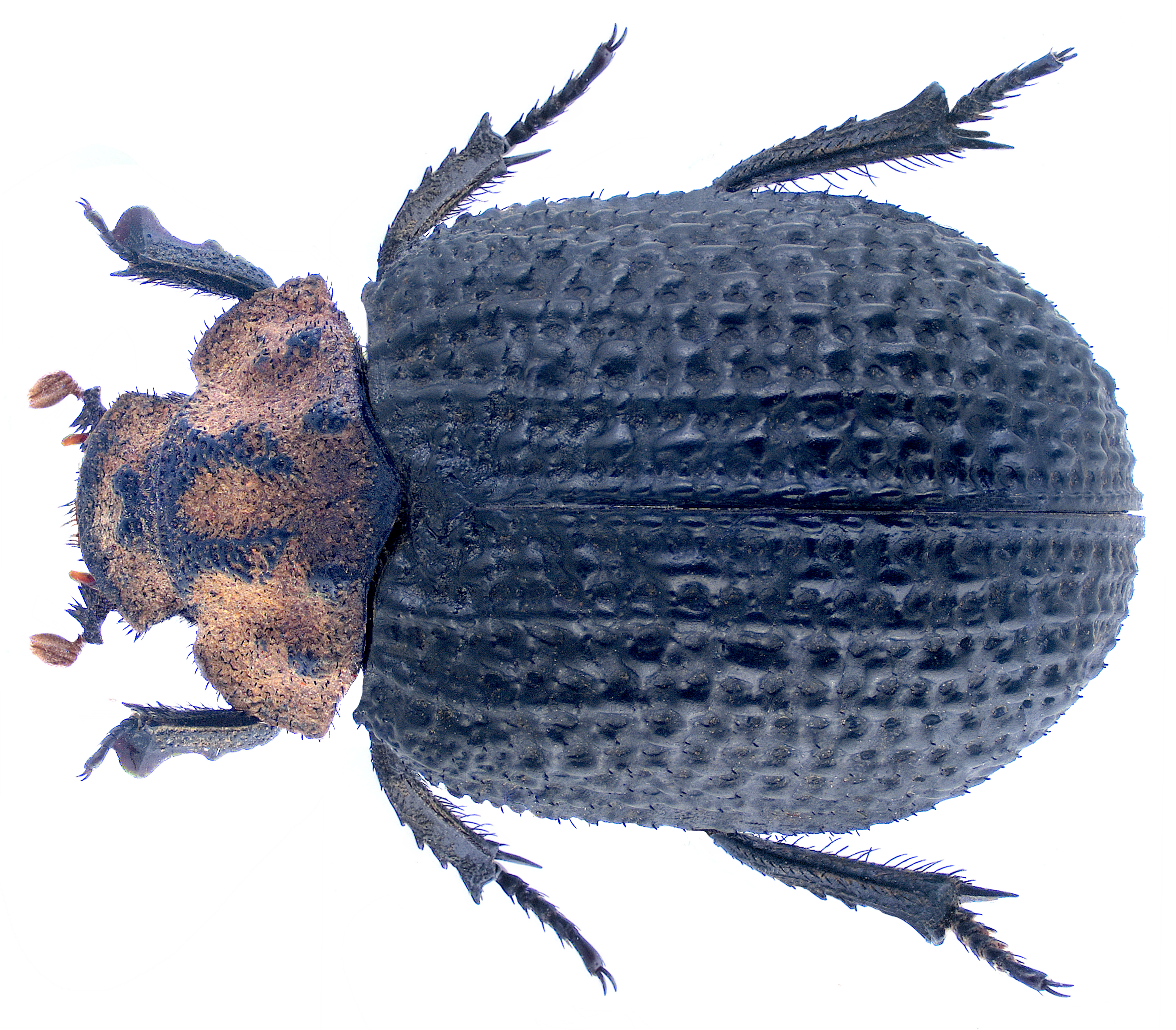
- Trox (Omorgus) radula Erichson 1843

Scientific classification
- Kingdom: Animalia
- Phylum: Arthropoda
- Class: Insecta
- Order: Coleoptera
- Suborder: Polyphaga
- Infraorder: Scarabaeiformia
- Family: Trogidae
- Genus: Omorgus
- Species: O. radula

Binomial name
- Omorgus radula Erichson, 1843

= Omorgus radula =

Species of beetle

Omorgus radula is a species of hide beetle in the subfamily Omorginae and subgenus Afromorgus.
