= Polynoncus neuquen =

Scientific classification
- Domain: Eukaryota
- Kingdom: Animalia
- Phylum: Arthropoda
- Class: Insecta
- Order: Coleoptera
- Suborder: Polyphaga
- Infraorder: Scarabaeiformia
- Family: Trogidae
- Genus: Polynoncus
- Species: P. neuquen

Binomial name
- Polynoncus neuquen Vaurie, 1962

Species of beetle

Polynoncus neuquen is a species of hide beetle in the subfamily Omorginae found in Argentina and Chile.
