= Polynoncus gemmifer =

Scientific classification
- Kingdom: Animalia
- Phylum: Arthropoda
- Class: Insecta
- Order: Coleoptera
- Suborder: Polyphaga
- Infraorder: Scarabaeiformia
- Family: Trogidae
- Genus: Polynoncus
- Species: P. gemmifer

Binomial name
- Polynoncus gemmifer Blanchard, 1846

Species of beetle

Polynoncus gemmifer is a species of hide beetle in the subfamily Omorginae found in Brazil, Argentina, Chile, and Uruguay.
