= Polynoncus tenebrosus =

Scientific classification
- Kingdom: Animalia
- Phylum: Arthropoda
- Class: Insecta
- Order: Coleoptera
- Suborder: Polyphaga
- Infraorder: Scarabaeiformia
- Family: Trogidae
- Genus: Polynoncus
- Species: P. tenebrosus

Binomial name
- Polynoncus tenebrosus Harold, 1872

Species of beetle

Polynoncus tenebrosus is a species of hide beetle in the subfamily Omorginae found in Ecuador.
