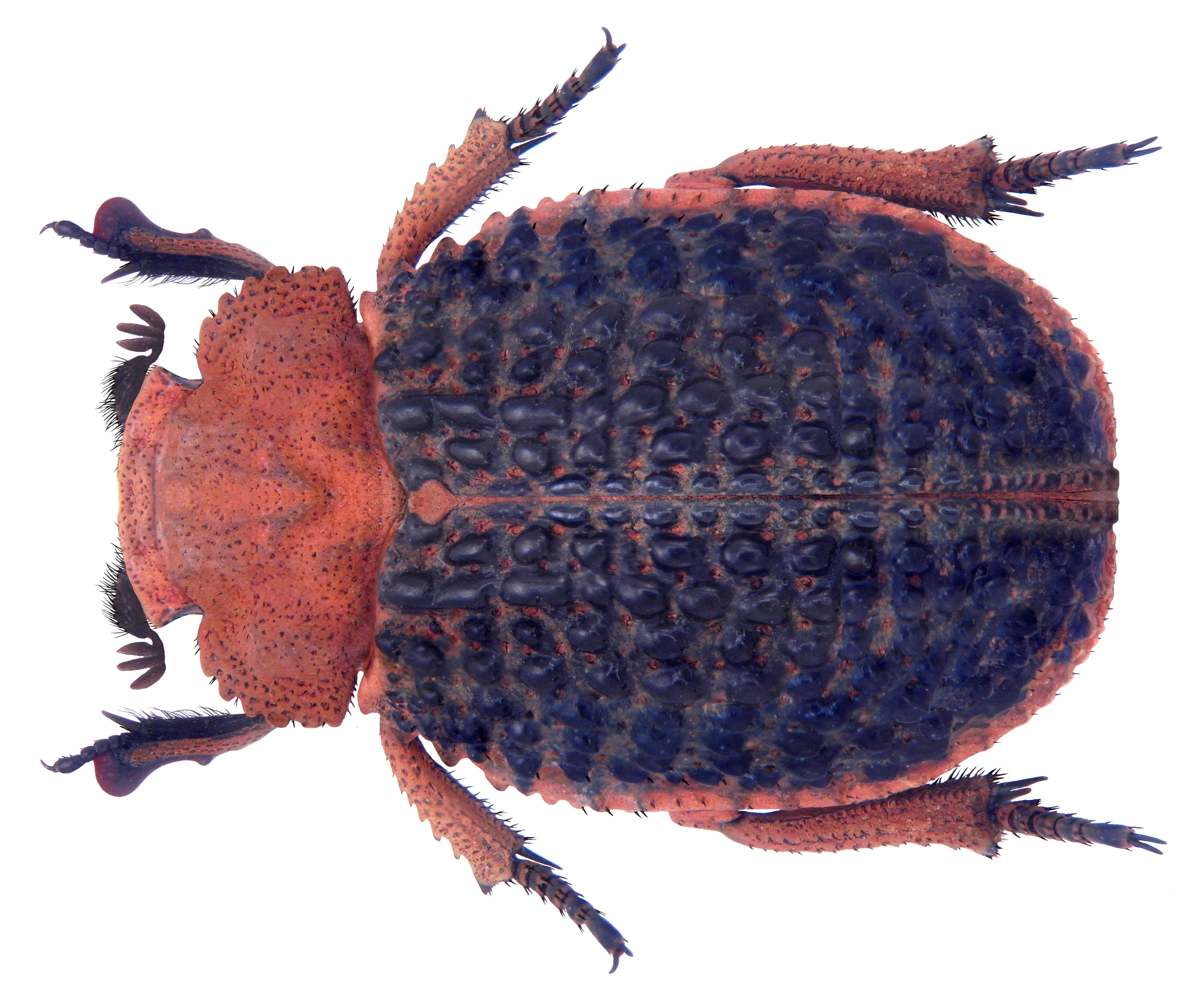

Scientific classification
- Kingdom: Animalia
- Phylum: Arthropoda
- Class: Insecta
- Order: Coleoptera
- Suborder: Polyphaga
- Infraorder: Scarabaeiformia
- Family: Trogidae
- Genus: Omorgus
- Species: O. baccatus

Binomial name
- Omorgus baccatus Gerstaecker, 1867

= Omorgus baccatus =

Species of beetle

Omorgus baccatus is a species of hide beetle in the subfamily Omorginae and subgenus Afromorgus.
