= Polynoncus brevicollis =

Scientific classification
- Domain: Eukaryota
- Kingdom: Animalia
- Phylum: Arthropoda
- Class: Insecta
- Order: Coleoptera
- Suborder: Polyphaga
- Infraorder: Scarabaeiformia
- Family: Trogidae
- Genus: Polynoncus
- Species: P. brevicollis

Binomial name
- Polynoncus brevicollis Eschscholtz, 1822

Species of beetle

Polynoncus brevicollis is a species of hide beetle in the subfamily Omorginae found in Argentina, Bolivia, Paraguay, Peru, Chile, and Colombia.
