= Polynoncus longitarsis =

Scientific classification
- Kingdom: Animalia
- Phylum: Arthropoda
- Class: Insecta
- Order: Coleoptera
- Suborder: Polyphaga
- Infraorder: Scarabaeiformia
- Family: Trogidae
- Genus: Polynoncus
- Species: P. longitarsis

Binomial name
- Polynoncus longitarsis Harold, 1872

Species of beetle

Polynoncus longitarsis is a species of hide beetle in the subfamily Omorginae found in Chile and Argentina.
