= Polynoncus aricensis =

Scientific classification
- Domain: Eukaryota
- Kingdom: Animalia
- Phylum: Arthropoda
- Class: Insecta
- Order: Coleoptera
- Suborder: Polyphaga
- Infraorder: Scarabaeiformia
- Family: Trogidae
- Genus: Polynoncus
- Species: P. aricensis

Binomial name
- Polynoncus aricensis Gutierrez, 1950

Species of beetle

Polynoncus aricensis is a species of hide beetle in the subfamily Omorginae.
