= Polynoncus patagonicus =

Scientific classification
- Kingdom: Animalia
- Phylum: Arthropoda
- Class: Insecta
- Order: Coleoptera
- Suborder: Polyphaga
- Infraorder: Scarabaeiformia
- Family: Trogidae
- Genus: Polynoncus
- Species: P. patagonicus

Binomial name
- Polynoncus patagonicus Blanchard, 1846

Species of beetle

Polynoncus patagonicus is a species of hide beetle in the subfamily Omorginae found in Argentina.
