= T. terrestris =

T. terrestris may refer to:

- Tapirus terrestris, a mammal species
- Testudo terrestris, a tortoise species in the genus Testudo
- Tribulus terrestris, a plant species
- Trox terrestris, a beetle species
- Trugon terrestris, a bird species

== See also ==
- Terrestris
