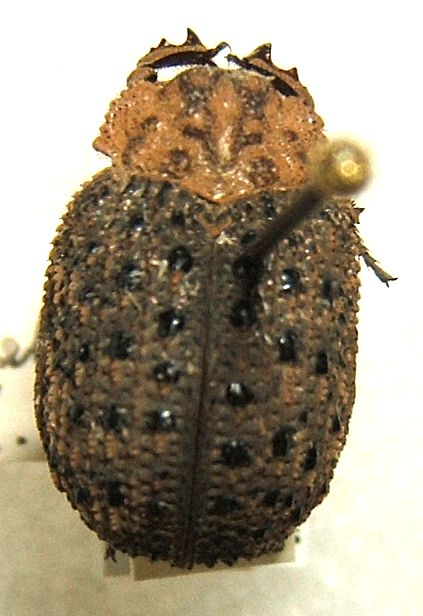
- Omorgus granulatus, adult

Scientific classification
- Kingdom: Animalia
- Phylum: Arthropoda
- Class: Insecta
- Order: Coleoptera
- Suborder: Polyphaga
- Infraorder: Scarabaeiformia
- Family: Trogidae
- Genus: Omorgus
- Species: O. granulatus

Binomial name
- Omorgus granulatus (Herbst, 1783)

= Omorgus granulatus =

Species of beetle

Omorgus granulatus is a beetle of the family Trogidae found in India, Sri Lanka, Pakistan, and Afghanistan.
