= Glyptotrox simi =

Scientific classification
- Kingdom: Animalia
- Phylum: Arthropoda
- Class: Insecta
- Order: Coleoptera
- Suborder: Polyphaga
- Infraorder: Scarabaeiformia
- Family: Trogidae
- Genus: Glyptotrox
- Species: G. simi

Binomial name
- Glyptotrox simi Robinson, 1940

Species of beetle

Glyptotrox simi is a species of hide beetle in the subfamily Troginae.
