= Glyptotrox tibialis =

Scientific classification
- Kingdom: Animalia
- Phylum: Arthropoda
- Class: Insecta
- Order: Coleoptera
- Suborder: Polyphaga
- Infraorder: Scarabaeiformia
- Family: Trogidae
- Genus: Glyptotrox
- Species: G. tibialis

Binomial name
- Glyptotrox tibialis Masumoto, Ochi & Li, 2005

Species of beetle

Glyptotrox tibialis is a species of hide beetle in the subfamily Troginae.
