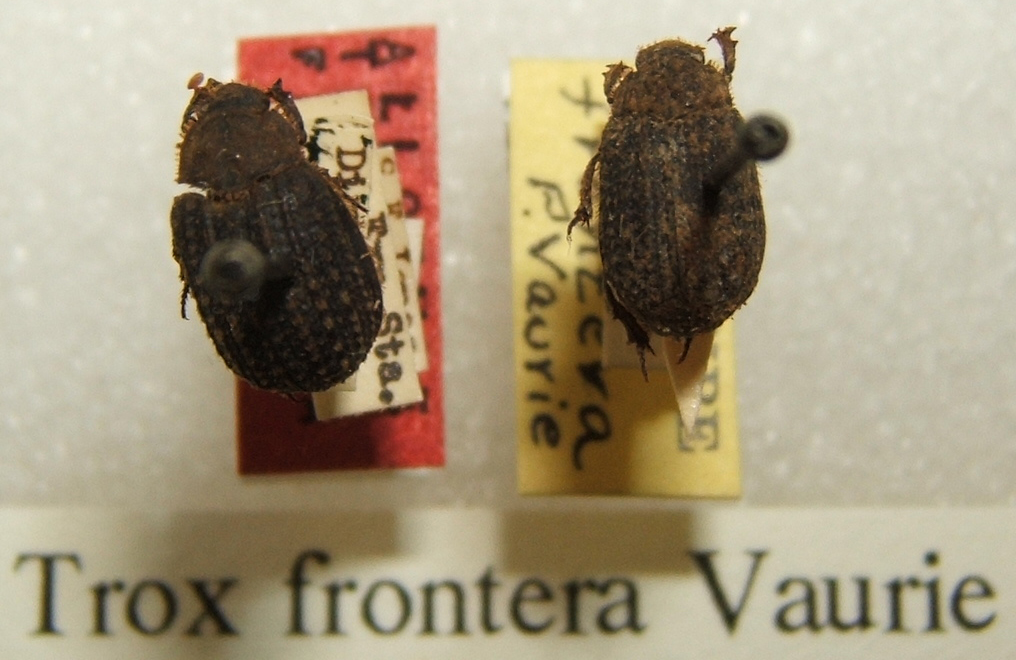
- Glyptotrox frontera, adult

Scientific classification
- Kingdom: Animalia
- Phylum: Arthropoda
- Class: Insecta
- Order: Coleoptera
- Suborder: Polyphaga
- Infraorder: Scarabaeiformia
- Family: Trogidae
- Genus: Glyptotrox
- Species: G. frontera

Binomial name
- Glyptotrox frontera Vaurie, 1955

= Glyptotrox frontera =

Species of beetle

Glyptotrox frontera is a beetle in the family Trogidae.

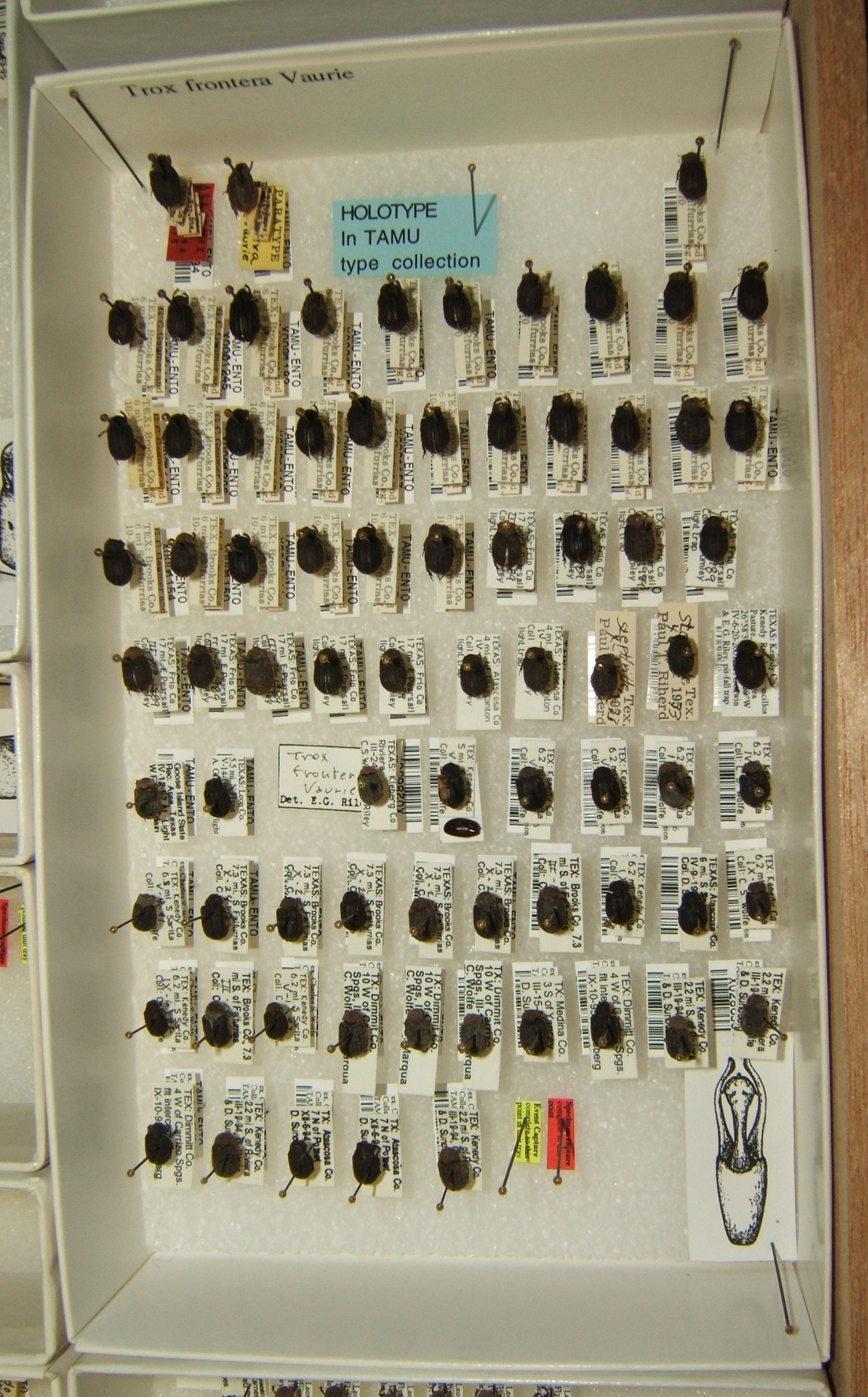
Glyptotrox frontera variation
