= Glyptotrox uenoi =

Scientific classification
- Kingdom: Animalia
- Phylum: Arthropoda
- Class: Insecta
- Order: Coleoptera
- Suborder: Polyphaga
- Infraorder: Scarabaeiformia
- Family: Trogidae
- Genus: Glyptotrox
- Species: G. uenoi

Binomial name
- Glyptotrox uenoi Nomura, 1961

Species of beetle

Glyptotrox uenoi is a species of hide beetle in the subfamily Troginae.
