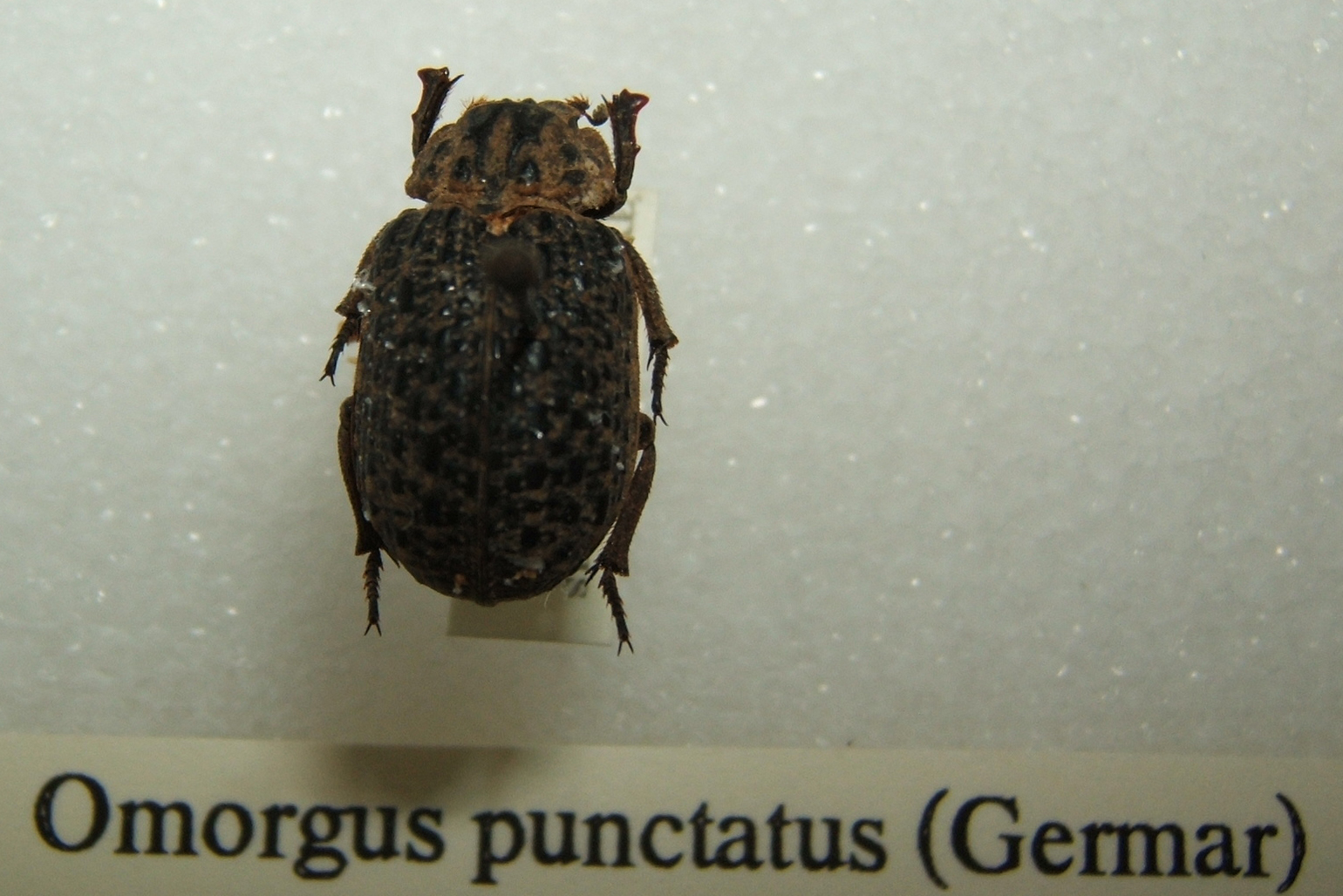
- Omorgus punctatus, adult

Scientific classification
- Kingdom: Animalia
- Phylum: Arthropoda
- Class: Insecta
- Order: Coleoptera
- Suborder: Polyphaga
- Infraorder: Scarabaeiformia
- Family: Trogidae
- Genus: Omorgus
- Species: O. punctatus

Binomial name
- Omorgus punctatus (Germar, 1824)

= Omorgus punctatus =

Species of beetle

Omorgus punctatus is a beetle of the family Trogidae. It is found in the United States and Mexico.
