= Polynoncus crypticus =

Scientific classification
- Domain: Eukaryota
- Kingdom: Animalia
- Phylum: Arthropoda
- Class: Insecta
- Order: Coleoptera
- Suborder: Polyphaga
- Infraorder: Scarabaeiformia
- Family: Trogidae
- Genus: Polynoncus
- Species: P. crypticus

Binomial name
- Polynoncus crypticus Diéguez, 2019

Species of beetle

Polynoncus crypticus is a species of hide beetle in the family Trogidae, being found in Chile and discovered in 2019.
