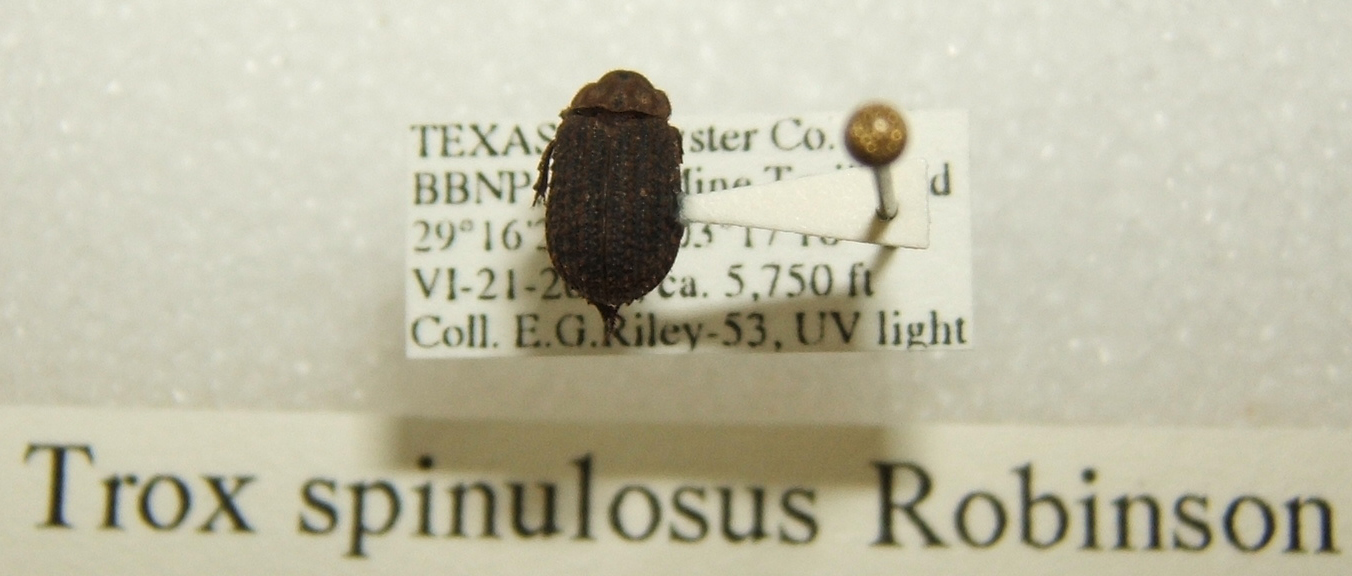
- Glyptotrox spinulosus, adult

Scientific classification
- Kingdom: Animalia
- Phylum: Arthropoda
- Class: Insecta
- Order: Coleoptera
- Suborder: Polyphaga
- Infraorder: Scarabaeiformia
- Family: Trogidae
- Genus: Glyptotrox
- Species: G. spinulosus

Binomial name
- Glyptotrox spinulosus Robinson, 1940

= Glyptotrox spinulosus =

Species of beetle

Glyptotrox spinulosus is a species of beetle in the family Trogidae.

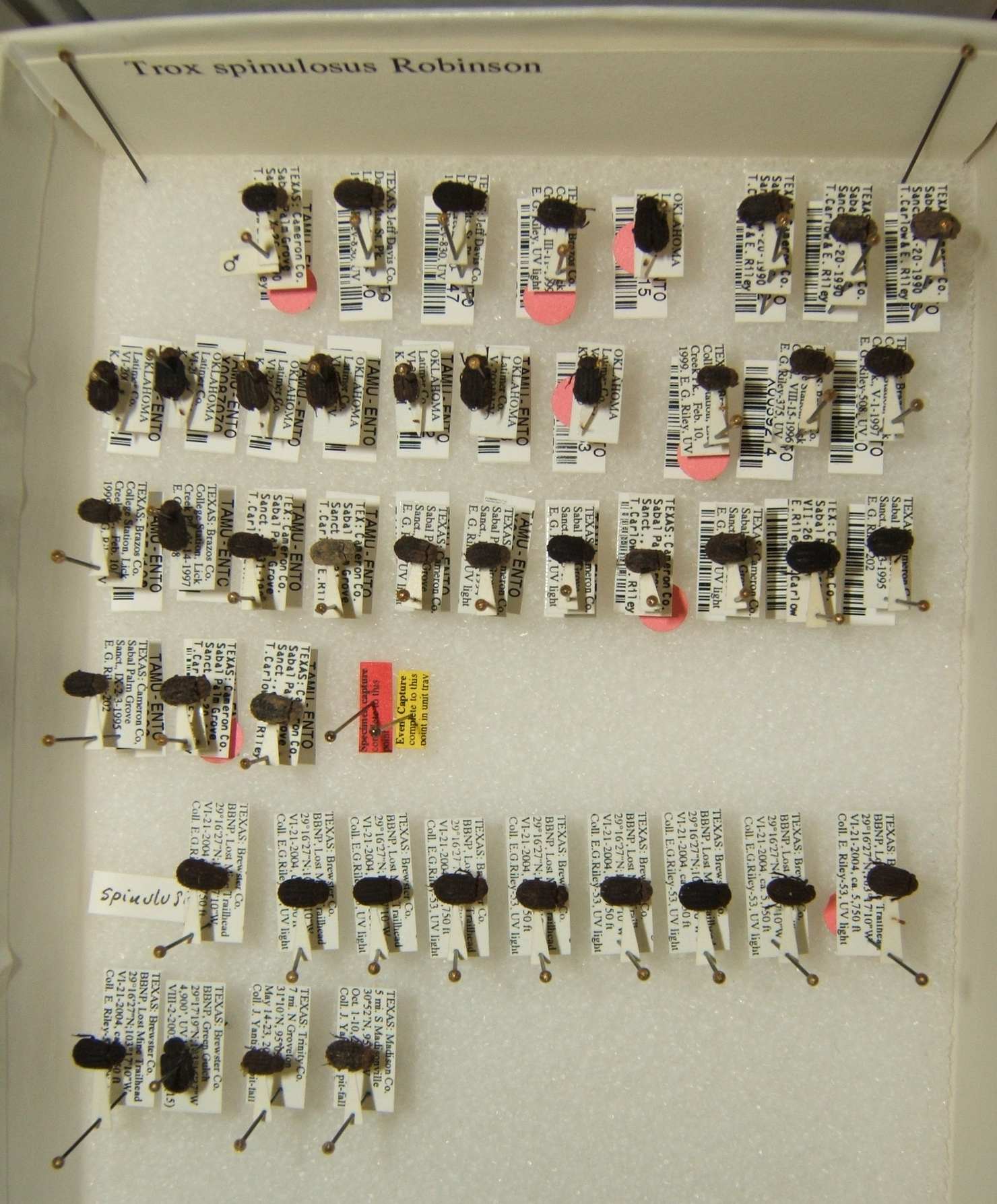
Trox spinulosus variation

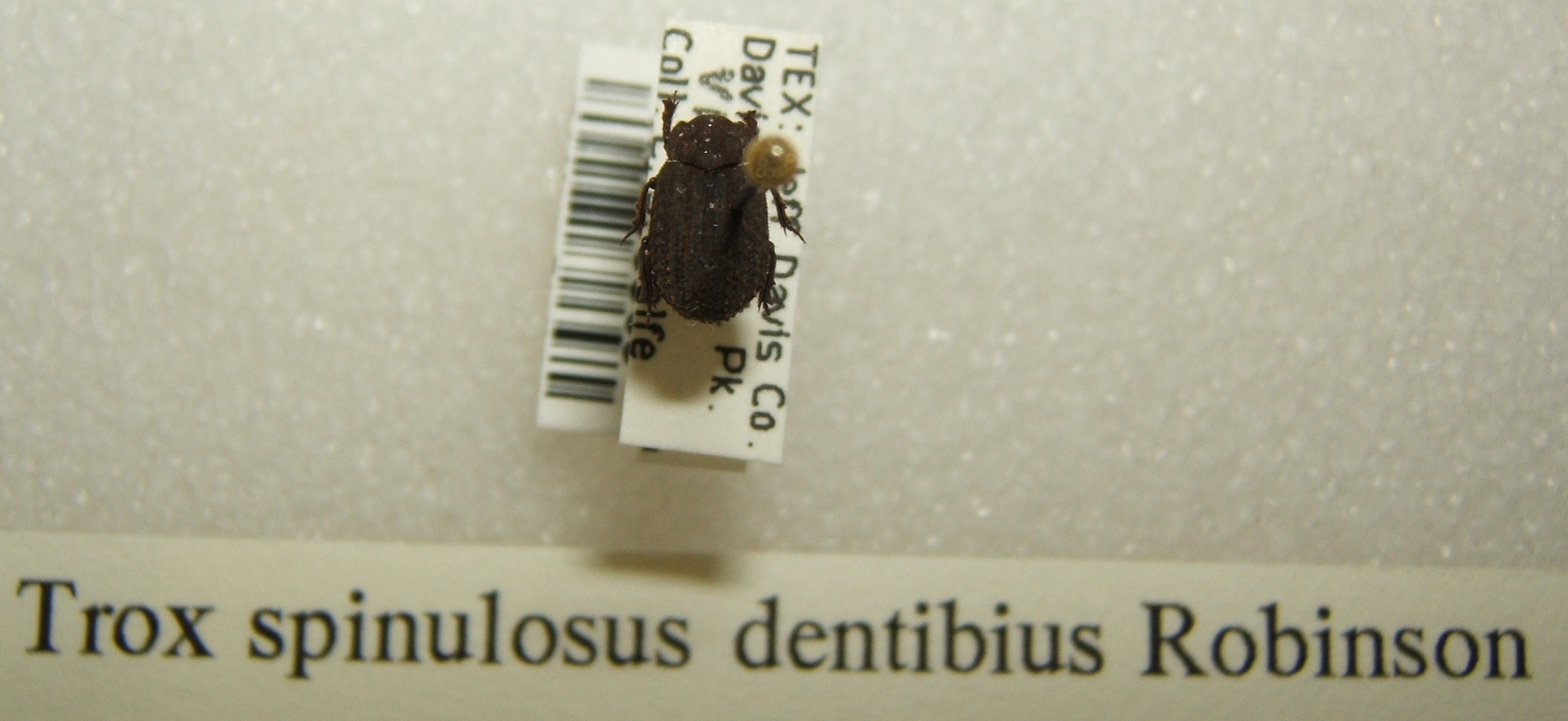
Trox spinulosus dentibius

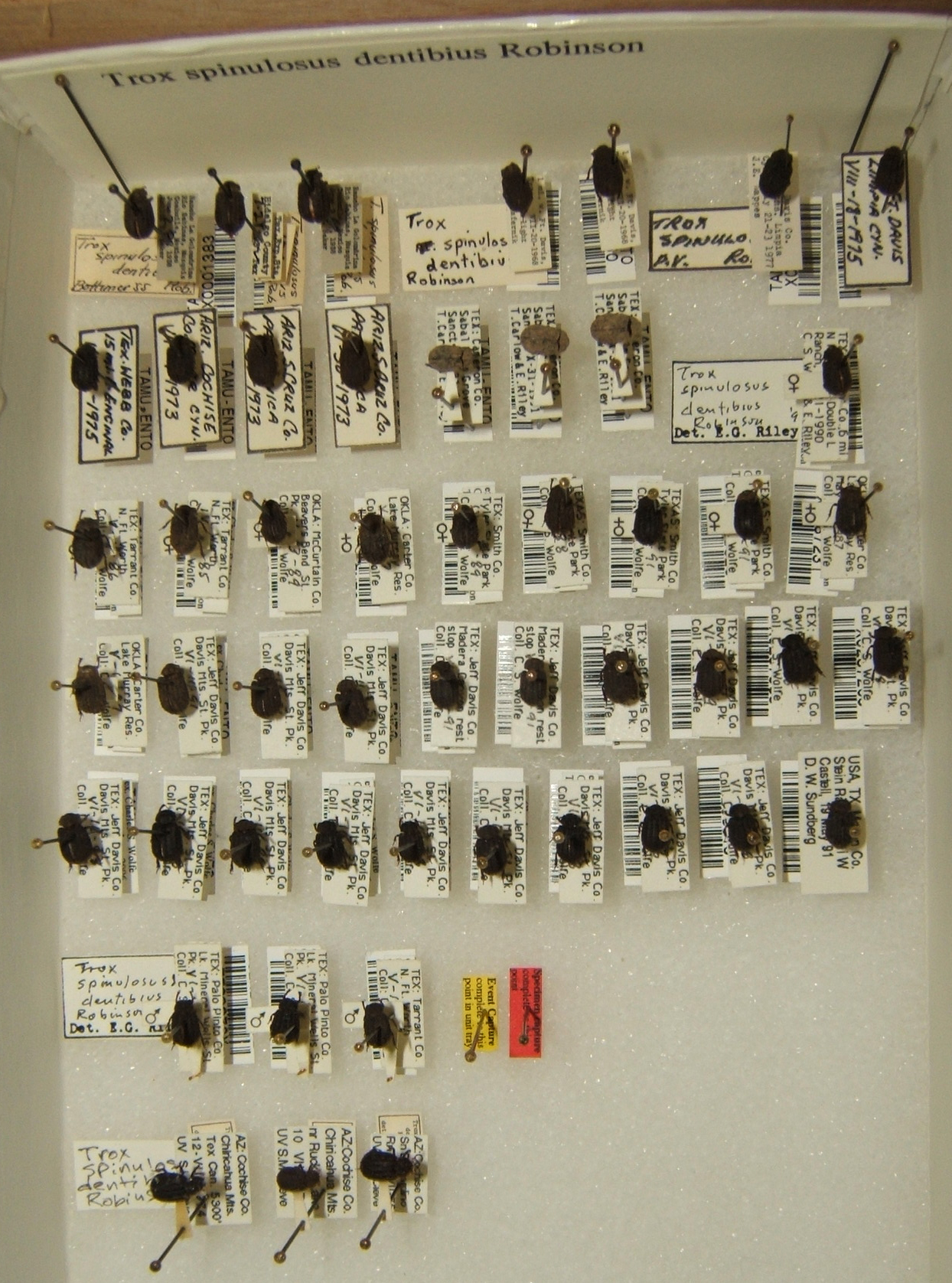
Trox spinulosus dentibius variation

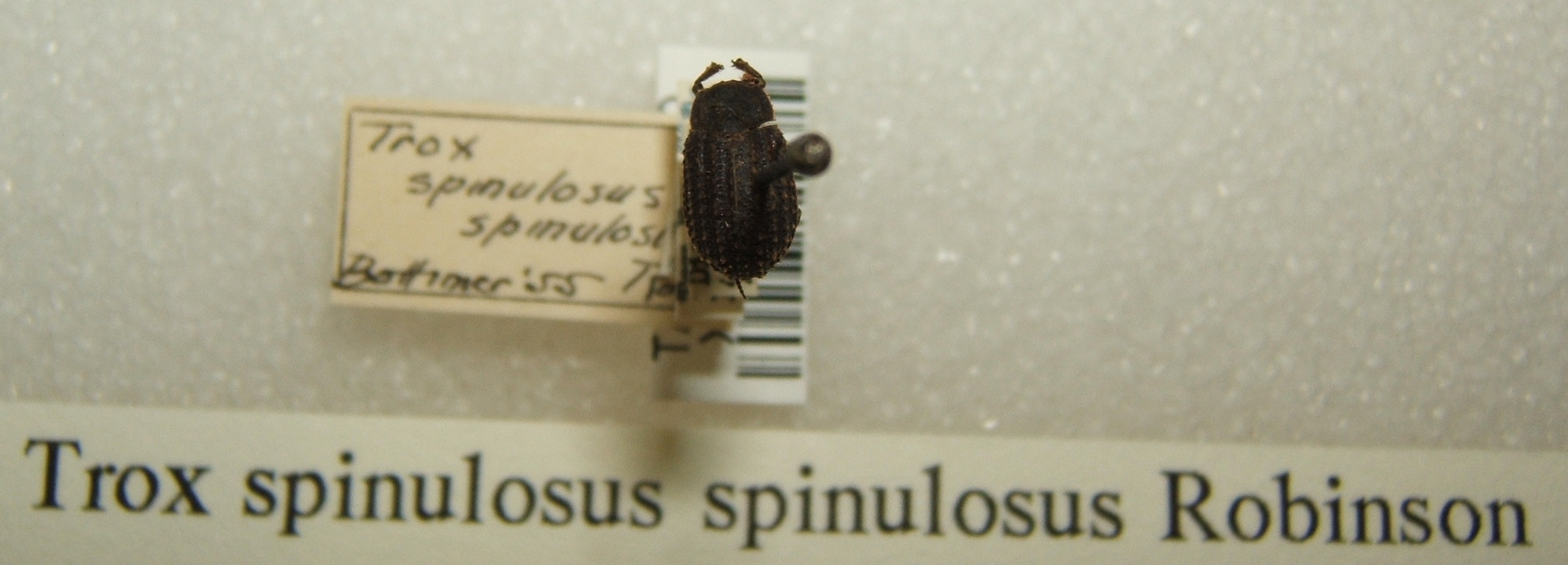
Trox spinulosus spinulosus

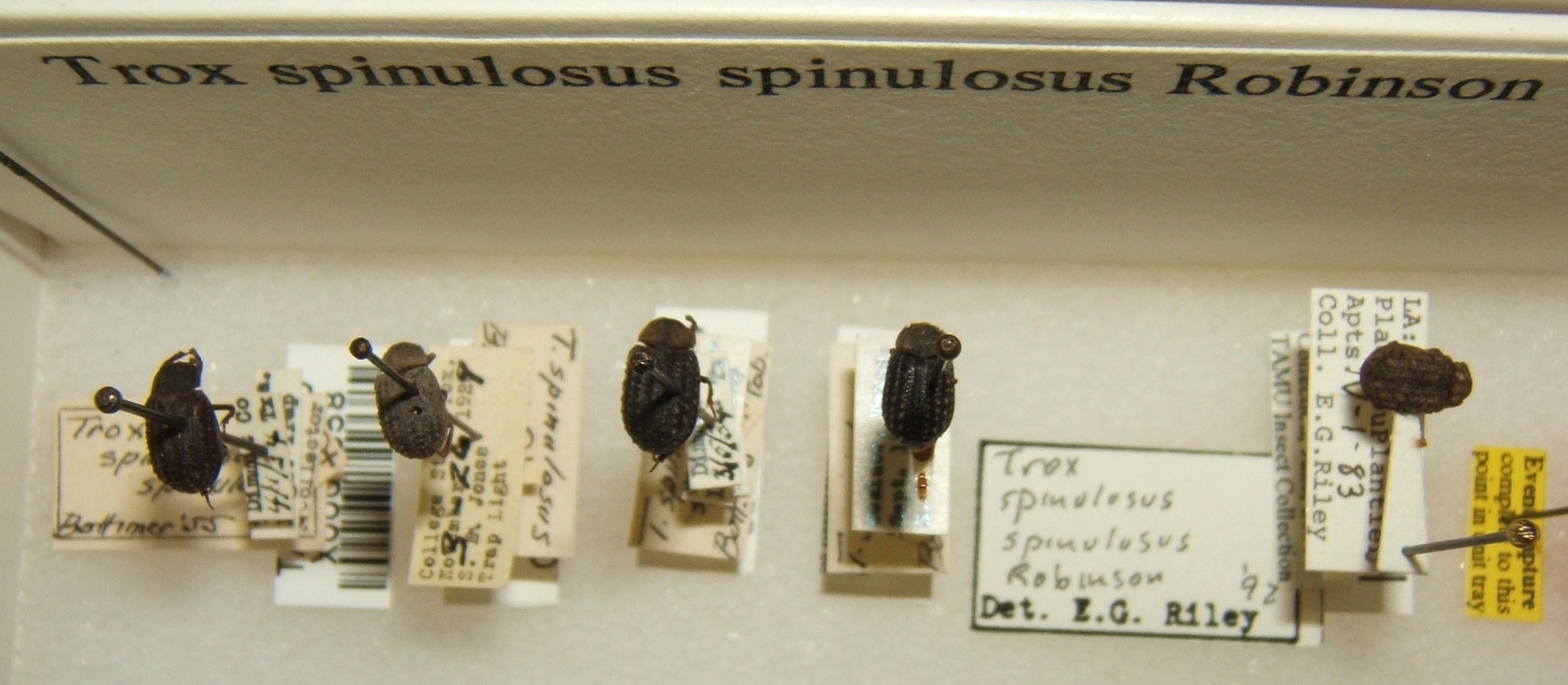
Trox spinulosus spinulosus variation
