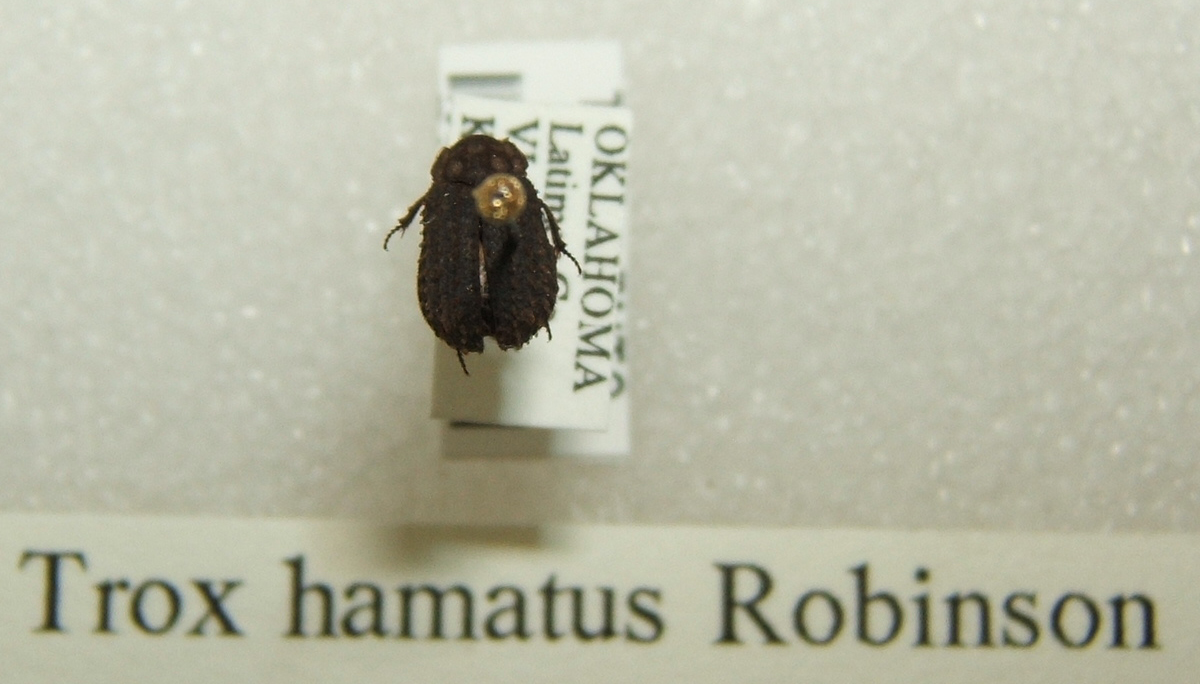
- Glyptotrox hamatus, adult

Scientific classification
- Kingdom: Animalia
- Phylum: Arthropoda
- Class: Insecta
- Order: Coleoptera
- Suborder: Polyphaga
- Infraorder: Scarabaeiformia
- Family: Trogidae
- Genus: Glyptotrox
- Species: G. hamatus

Binomial name
- Glyptotrox hamatus Robinson, 1940

= Glyptotrox hamatus =

Species of beetle

Glyptotrox hamatus is a beetle of the family Trogidae.

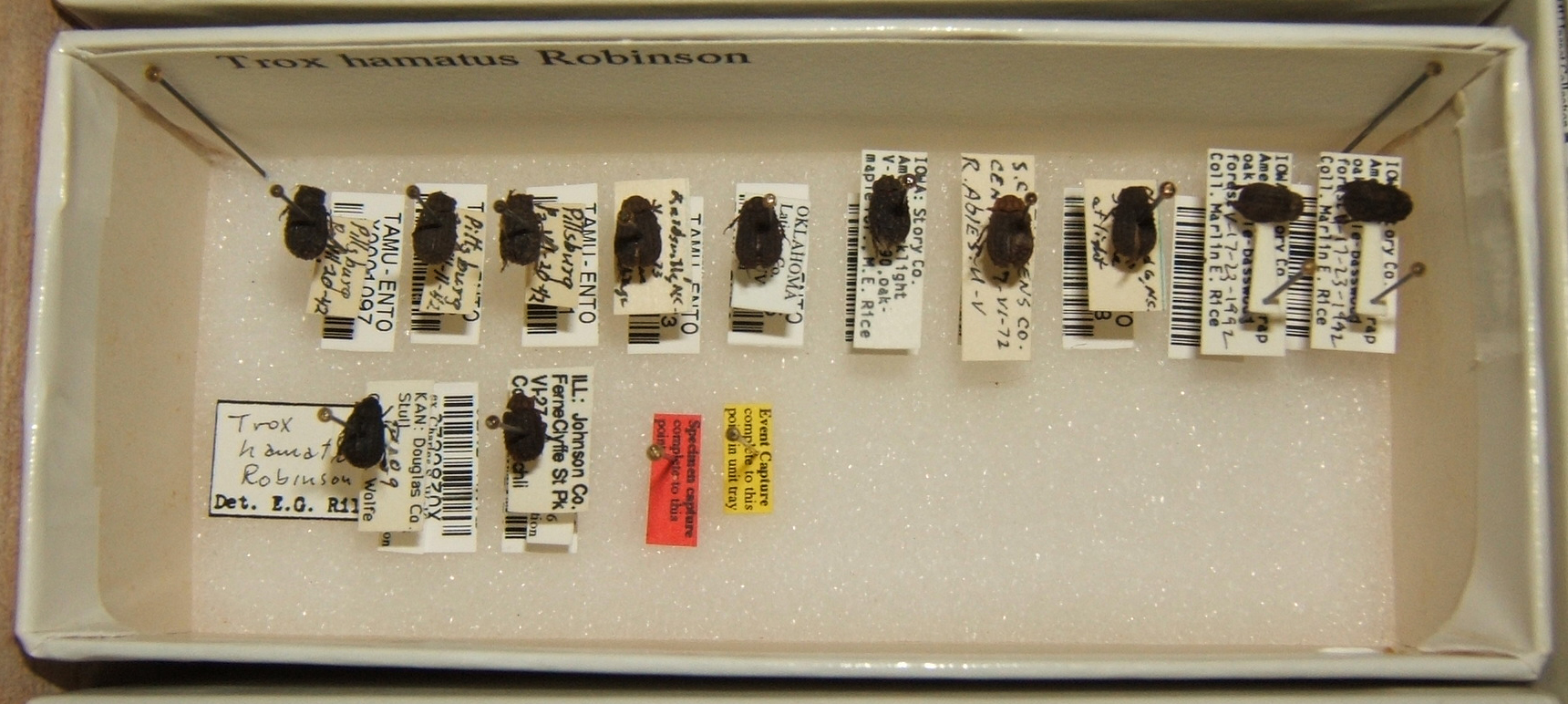
Trox hamatus variations
