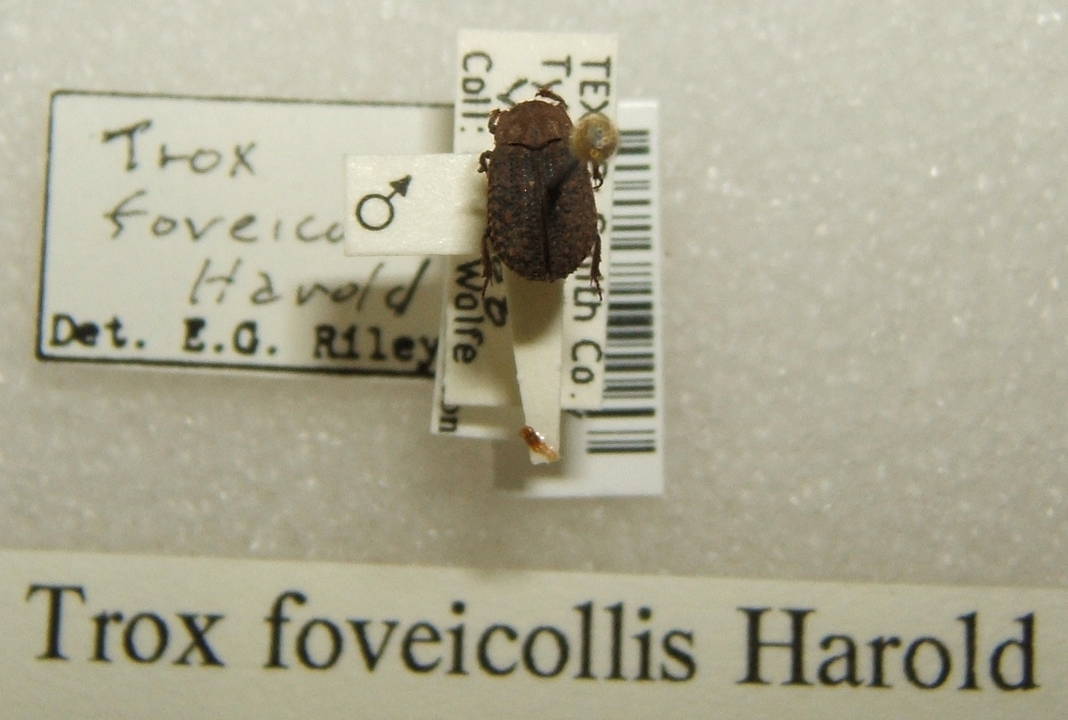
- Glyptotrox foveicollis, adult male

Scientific classification
- Kingdom: Animalia
- Phylum: Arthropoda
- Class: Insecta
- Order: Coleoptera
- Suborder: Polyphaga
- Infraorder: Scarabaeiformia
- Family: Trogidae
- Genus: Glyptotrox
- Species: G. foveicollis

Binomial name
- Glyptotrox foveicollis Harold, 1857

= Glyptotrox foveicollis =

Species of beetle

Glyptotrox foveicollis is a species of hide beetle in the subfamily Troginae.

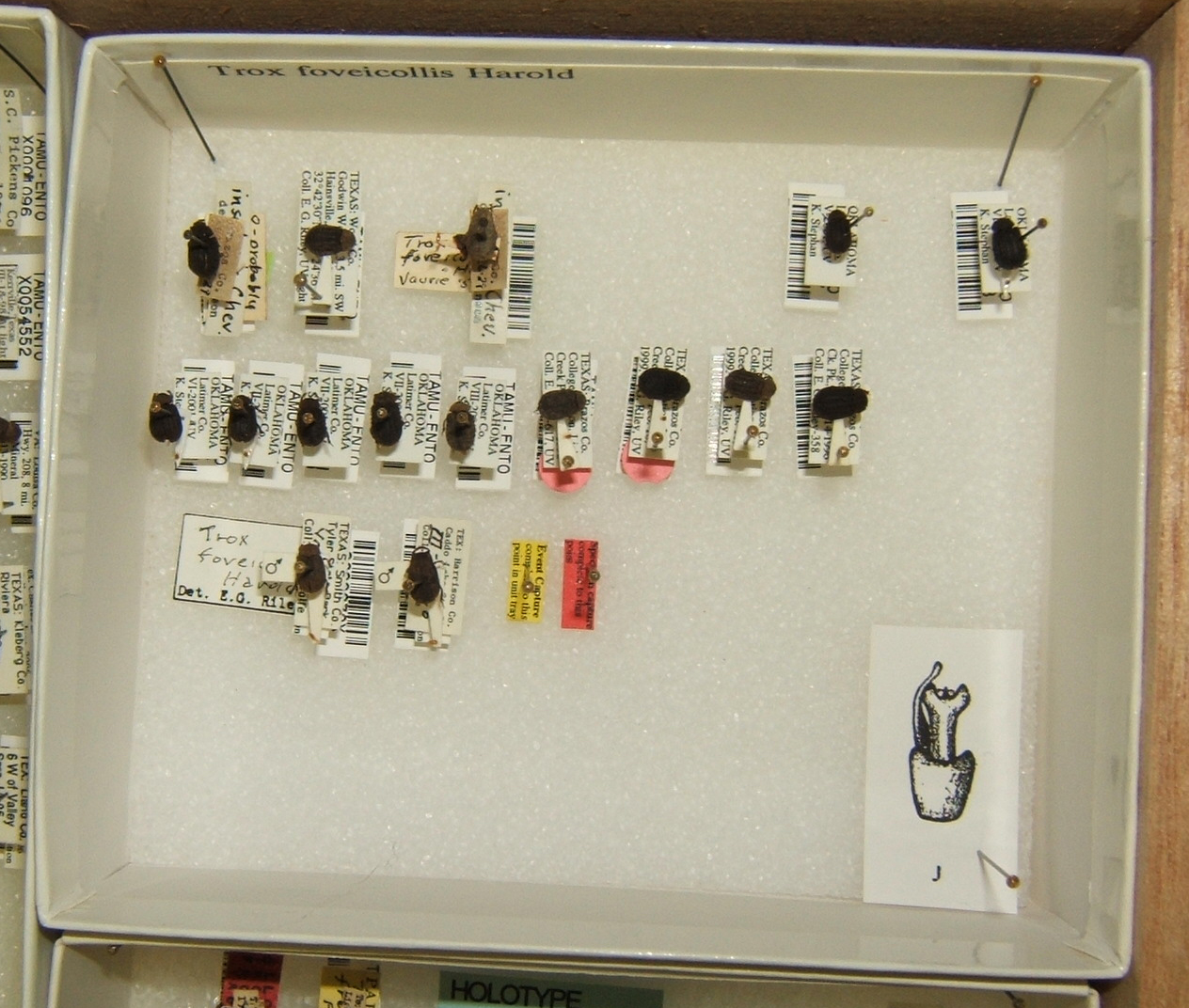
Glyptotrox foveicollis variation
