= Paratrox =

Paratrox Temporal range: 125–113 Ma

Scientific classification
- Kingdom: Animalia
- Phylum: Arthropoda
- Class: Insecta
- Order: Coleoptera
- Suborder: Polyphaga
- Infraorder: Scarabaeiformia
- Family: Trogidae
- Subfamily: Troginae
- Genus: †Paratrox; Nikolajev, 2009
- Species: †P. medvedevi

Binomial name
- †Paratrox medvedevi Nikolajev, 2009

Extinct species of beetle

Paratrox medvedevi is an extinct, fossil species of hide beetle that lived in modern-day Mongolia around 125 to 113 million years ago, during the Lower Cretaceous. P. medvedevi is the only species of the genus Paratrox.
