= Cretomorgus =

Scientific classification
- Domain: Eukaryota
- Kingdom: Animalia
- Phylum: Arthropoda
- Class: Insecta
- Order: Coleoptera
- Suborder: Polyphaga
- Infraorder: Scarabaeiformia
- Family: Trogidae
- Subfamily: Omorginae
- Genus: †Cretomorgus; Nikolajev, 2007
- Species: †C. ikhbogdensis

Binomial name
- †Cretomorgus ikhbogdensis Nikolajev, 2007

Extinct species of beetle

Cretomorgus ikhbogdensis is an extinct, fossil species of hide beetle that lived in modern-day Mongolia during the Lower Cretaceous, approximately 112 million years ago, making it the earliest preserved species of the subfamily Omorginae. C. ikhbogdensis is the sole species of the genus Cretomorgus.
