= Glyptotrox =

Scientific classification
- Domain: Eukaryota
- Kingdom: Animalia
- Phylum: Arthropoda
- Class: Insecta
- Order: Coleoptera
- Suborder: Polyphaga
- Infraorder: Scarabaeiformia
- Family: Trogidae
- Subfamily: Troginae
- Genus: Glyptotrox; Nikolajev, 2016

Genus of beetles

Glyptotrox is a genus of hide beetle in the subfamily Troginae. It contains the following species:

- Glyptotrox abei (Ochi, Kon & Kawahara, 2014)
- Glyptotrox boucomonti (Paulian, 1933)
- Glyptotrox brahminus (Pittino, 1985)
- Glyptotrox cambeforti (Pittino, 1985)
- Glyptotrox cambodjanus (Pittino, 1985)
- Glyptotrox dhaulagiri (Paulus, 1972)
- Glyptotrox doiinthanonensis (Masumoto, 1996)
- Glyptotrox formosanus (Nomura, 1973)
- Glyptotrox foveicollis (Harold, 1872)
- Glyptotrox frontera (Vaurie, 1955)
- Glyptotrox hamatus (Robinson, 1940)
- Glyptotrox inadai (Ochi, Kawahara & Inagaki, 2008)
- Glyptotrox ineptus (Balthasar, 1931)
- Glyptotrox insularis (Chevrolat, 1864)
- Glyptotrox kerleyi (Masumoto, 1996)
- Glyptotrox kiuchii (Masumoto, 1996)
- Glyptotrox mandli (Balthasar, 1931)
- Glyptotrox matsudai (Ochi & Hori, 1999)
- Glyptotrox mutsuensis (Nomura, 1937)
- Glyptotrox niisatorui (Ochi, Kon & Kawahara, 2014)
- Glyptotrox opacotuberculatus (Motschulsky, 1860)
- Glyptotrox parvisetosus (Ochi, Kon & Bai, 2010)
- Glyptotrox paulseni (Ratcliffe, 2016)
- Glyptotrox poggii (Ochi, Kon & Kawahara, 2014)
- Glyptotrox poringensis (Ochi, Kon & Kawahara, 2005)
- Glyptotrox simi (Robinson, 1940)
- Glyptotrox spinulosus (Robinson, 1940)
- Glyptotrox sugayai (Masumoto & Kiuchi, 1995)
- Glyptotrox taiwanus (Masumoto, Ochi & Li, 2005)
- Glyptotrox terrestris (Say, 1825)
- Glyptotrox tibialis (Masumoto, Ochi & Li, 2005)
- Glyptotrox uenoi (Nomura, 1961)
- Glyptotrox vietnamicus Ochi, Kon & Pham, 2020
- Glyptotrox vimmeri (Balthasar, 1931)
- Glyptotrox yamayai (Nakane, 1983)
- Glyptotrox yangi (Masumoto, Ochi & Li, 2005)
