= Avitortor =

Scientific classification
- Kingdom: Animalia
- Phylum: Arthropoda
- Class: Insecta
- Order: Coleoptera
- Suborder: Polyphaga
- Infraorder: Scarabaeiformia
- Family: Trogidae
- Subfamily: †Avitortorinae; Nikolajev, 2007
- Genus: †Avitortor; Ponomarenko, 1977

Genus of beetles

Avitortor is an extinct, fossil genus of hide beetle that lived during the Lower Cretaceous. Avitortor is the only genus of the subfamily Avitortorinae.

== Species ==
- †Avitortor dolichodactylus Nikolajev 2007 Dzun-Bain Formation, Mongolia, Aptian
- †Avitortor leptoscelis Nikritin 1977 Zaza Formation, Russia, Aptian
- †Avitortor ovalis Nikolajev 2007 Zaza Formation, Russia, Aptian
- †Avitortor parallelus Nikolajev 2007 Dzun-Bain Formation, Mongolia, Aptian
- †Avitortor primitivus Ponomarenko, 1977
