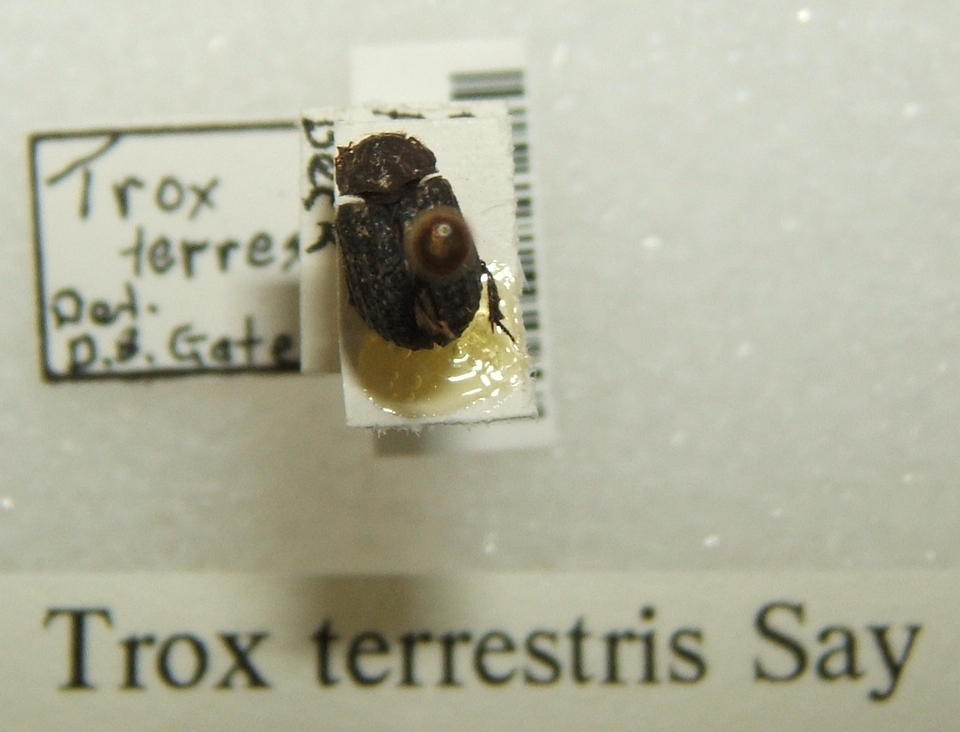
- Glyptotrox terrestris, adult

Scientific classification
- Kingdom: Animalia
- Phylum: Arthropoda
- Class: Insecta
- Order: Coleoptera
- Suborder: Polyphaga
- Infraorder: Scarabaeiformia
- Family: Trogidae
- Genus: Glyptotrox
- Species: G. terrestris

Binomial name
- Glyptotrox terrestris Say, 1825

= Glyptotrox terrestris =

Species of beetle

Glyptotrox terrestris is a beetle of the family Trogidae.
