= Kresnikus =

Scientific classification
- Domain: Eukaryota
- Kingdom: Animalia
- Phylum: Arthropoda
- Class: Insecta
- Order: Coleoptera
- Suborder: Polyphaga
- Infraorder: Scarabaeiformia
- Family: Trogidae
- Subfamily: †Kresnikinae; Tihelka, Huang & Cai, 2020
- Genus: †Kresnikus; Tihelka, Huang & Cai, 2020
- Species: †K. beynoni

Binomial name
- †Kresnikus beynoni Tihelka, Huang, & Cai, 2020

Species of beetles

Kresnikus beynoni is an extinct, fossil species of hide beetle that lived in modern-day Northern Myanmar during the mid-Cretaceous. K. beynoni is the only species of both the genus Kresnikus and the subfamily Kresnikinae.
