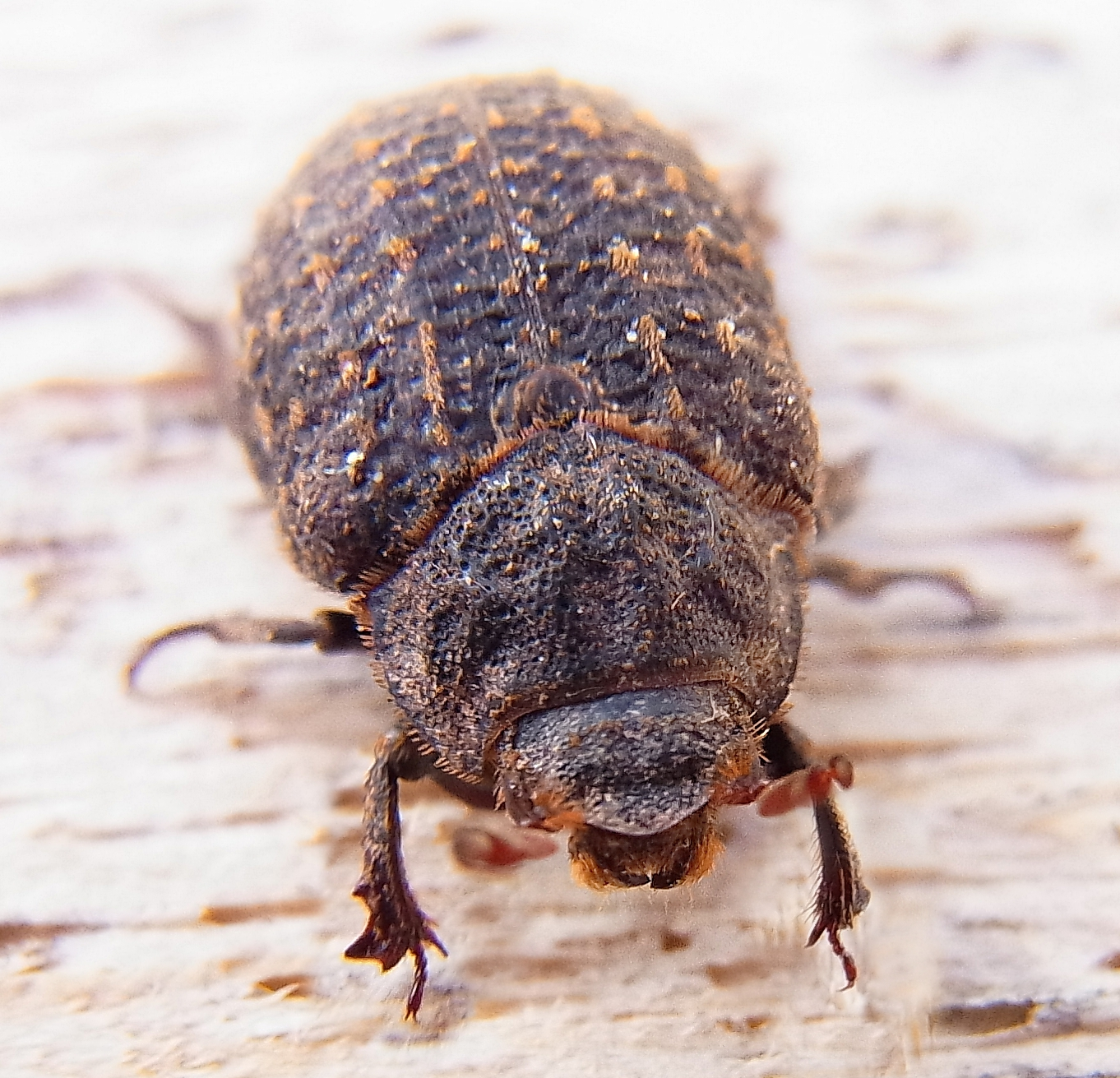
- Trox sabulosus

Scientific classification
- Kingdom: Animalia
- Phylum: Arthropoda
- Clade: Pancrustacea
- Class: Insecta
- Order: Coleoptera
- Suborder: Polyphaga
- Infraorder: Scarabaeiformia
- Family: Trogidae
- Genus: Trox
- Species: T. sabulosus

Binomial name
- Trox sabulosus (Linnaeus, 1758)

= Trox sabulosus =

Species of beetle

Trox sabulosus, commonly known as the sandy hide beetle, is a beetle of the family Trogidae. It is found across Europe, with some found in India and the United States.
