= Polynoncus =

Scientific classification
- Kingdom: Animalia
- Phylum: Arthropoda
- Class: Insecta
- Order: Coleoptera
- Suborder: Polyphaga
- Infraorder: Scarabaeiformia
- Family: Trogidae
- Subfamily: Omorginae
- Genus: Polynoncus; Burmeister, 1847

Genus of beetles

Polynoncus is a genus of beetles of the Family Trogidae. It contains the following species:

- Polynoncus aeger (Guerin-Meneville, 1844) (South America)
- Polynoncus aricensis (Gutierrez, 1950) (South America)
- Polynoncus bifurcatus (Vaurie, 1962) (South America)
- Polynoncus brasiliensis (Vaurie, 1962) (South America)
- Polynoncus brevicollis (Eschscholtz, 1822) (South America)
- Polynoncus bullatus (Curtis, 1845) (Chile, Argentina)
- Polynoncus burmeisteri (Pittino, 1987) (Argentina)
- Polynoncus chilensis (Harold, 1872) (Chile, Argentina)
- Polynoncus crypticus (Diéguez, 2019) (Chile)
- Polynoncus diffluens (Vaurie, 1962) (Chile)
- Polynoncus ecuadorensis Vaurie, 1962 (Ecuador)
- Polynoncus erugatus Scholtz, 1990 (Argentina)
- Polynoncus galapagoensis (Van Dyke, 1953) (Galapagos Islands)
- Polynoncus gemmifer (Blanchard, 1846) (South America)
- Polynoncus gemmingeri (Harold, 1872) (Panama to Argentina)
- Polynoncus gibberosus Scholtz, 1990 (Chile)
- Polynoncus gordoni (Steiner, 1981) (Peru)
- Polynoncus guttifer (Harold, 1868) (South America)
- Polynoncus haafi Vaurie, 1962 (Argentina)
- Polynoncus hemisphaericus (Burmeister, 1876) (Argentina, Chile)
- Polynoncus juglans (Ratcliffe, 1978) (Brazil, Guyana)
- Polynoncus longitarsis (Harold, 1872) (Argentina, Chile)
- Polynoncus mirabilis Pittino, 1987 (Chile, Argentina)
- Polynoncus neuquen (Vaurie, 1962) (Chile, Argentina)
- Polynoncus parafurcatus (Pittino, 1987) (Argentina, Brazil)
- Polynoncus patagonicus (Blanchard, 1846) (Argentina)
- Polynoncus patriciae Pittino, 1987 (Argentina, Uruguay)
- Polynoncus pedestris (Harold, 1872) (Argentina)
- Polynoncus peruanus (Erichson, 1847) (South America)
- Polynoncus pilularius (Germar, 1824) (South America)
- Polynoncus pittinoi (Costa-Silva & Diéguez, 2020) (Argentina)
- Polynoncus sallei (Harold, 1872) (Madagascar, Ecuador, Peru)
- Polynoncus seymourensis (Mutchler, 1925) (Galapagos Islands)
- Polynoncus tenebrosus (Harold, 1872) (Ecuador)
- Polynoncus vazdemelloi (Huchet & Costa-Silva, 2018) (Brazil)
