= Omorginae =

Scientific classification
- Kingdom: Animalia
- Phylum: Arthropoda
- Clade: Pancrustacea
- Class: Insecta
- Order: Coleoptera
- Suborder: Polyphaga
- Infraorder: Scarabaeiformia
- Family: Trogidae
- Subfamily: Omorginae; Nikolajev, 2005

Subfamily of beetles

Omorginae is a subfamily of beetles in the family Trogidae which includes extant species and extinct beetle species from the Lower Cretaceous. The subfamily contains the following genera:

- †Cretomorgus Nikolajev, 2007
- Omorgus Erichson, 1847
- Polynoncus Burmeister, 1876
