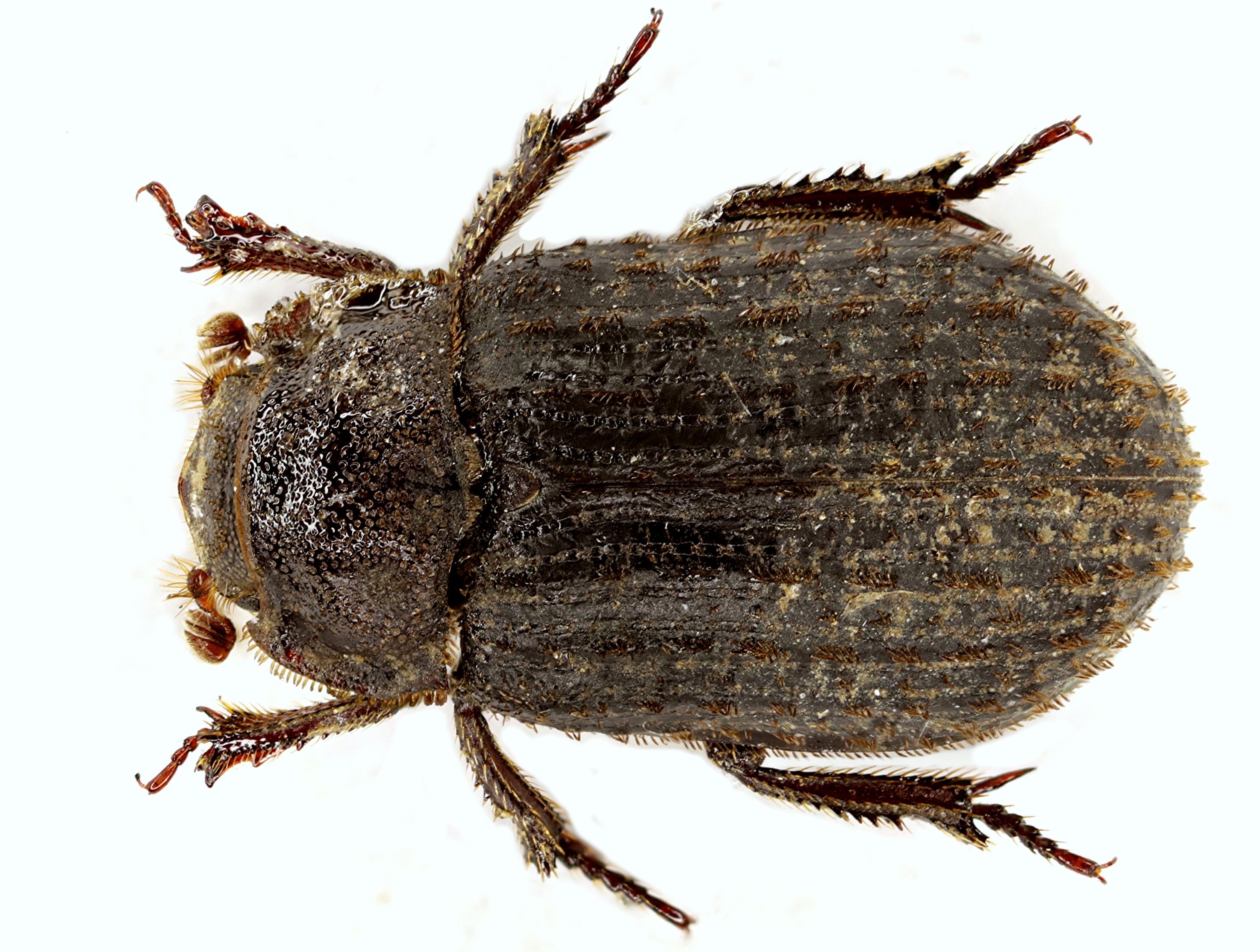
- Trox sabulosus

Scientific classification
- Kingdom: Animalia
- Phylum: Arthropoda
- Clade: Pancrustacea
- Class: Insecta
- Order: Coleoptera
- Suborder: Polyphaga
- Infraorder: Scarabaeiformia
- Superfamily: Scarabaeoidea
- Family: Trogidae; MacLeay, 1819

Diversity
- c. 300 species

= Trogidae =

Trogidae Temporal range: Aptian–Recent

Family of beetles

Trogidae, sometimes called hide beetles, is a family of beetles with a distinctive warty or bumpy appearance. Found worldwide, the family includes about 300 species contained in four or five genera.

Trogids range in length from 2 to 20 mm. Their shape is oblong to oval, with a generally flat abdomen. Their color ranges from brown to gray or black, and they often encrust their bodies with soil. They resemble scarab beetles with heavy limbs and spurs.

They are scavengers and are among the last species to visit and feed on carrion. They are most often found on the dry remains of dead animals. Both adults and larvae eat feathers and skin. Some species are found in bird and mammal nests. Details of the life histories of many species are poorly known, since many are specialized to particular types of nests. They are often overlooked by predators and collectors due to their behaviors of covering their bodies with soil and becoming motionless when disturbed.

This group may also be considered Troginae, a subfamily of the Scarabaeidae. The common name "skin beetle" is sometimes used in reference to these beetles, but more often refers to species of the Dermestidae.

== Origins ==
Hide beetles are found worldwide. More species of Trogidae are found in dry environments instead of moist environments, typically temperate plains areas. Each genus is more diverse in different regions of the world. Trox is found in the Holarctic/Ethiopian area, Omorgus within the southern continents, and Polynoncus is found in South America.

Controversy exists over whether Trogidae is a family of its own or a subfamily of Scarabaeidae. One major reason for the dispute between classifications is the possible evolution of the ommatidium in the eyes. Different environmental pressures and predators may have led to the adaptation of ommatidium structures within this family. For example, the more advanced and numerous the ommatidium, the more present the larger the ability of the insect to escape and elude predators. The Trogidae may have evolved in Australia.

The oldest known fossils are from the Early Cretaceous (Aptian) Zaza Formation of Russia and the Shar-Tolgoy and Dzun-Bain Formations of Mongolia, assignable to the extant genus Trox as well as the extinct genera Cretomorgus and Paratrox. Other known fossils include Kresnikus beynoni found in mid-Cretaceous aged Burmese amber.

== Morphology ==
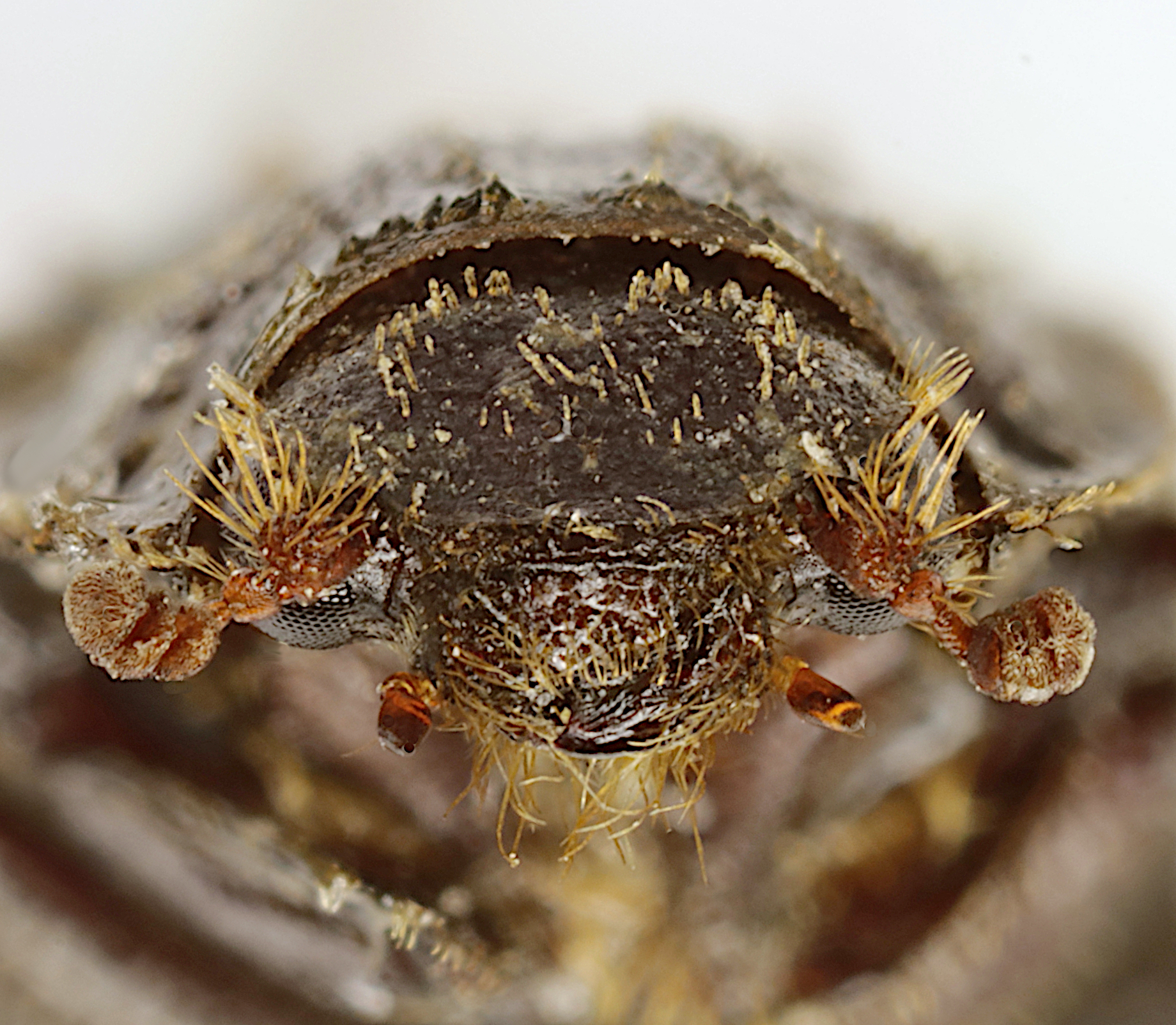
Closeup of head of Trox sabulosus

Trogidae are characterized by their distinct soil-encrusted, warty, or bumpy appearance. They are usually brown, gray, or black in color and are covered with short, dense setae. Their body shape is oblong to oval with a flat abdomen and their length varies from 2 to 20 mm. The antenna of hide beetles are usually short and clubbed. The hardened elytra of Trogidae, which are generally covered with small knobs giving the beetle their rough appearance, meet along the midline of the body and cover the entire abdomen and well-developed wings. Their heads are bent down and covered by the pronotum. They also have heavy limbs and spurs resembling those of scarab beetles. Trogidae larvae are a creamy yellow/white in color, except at their caudal end which darkens as it accumulates feces. Their heads are dark and heavily sclerotized. The abdominal segments of hide beetles have at least one or more transverse rows of setae.

== Diet and habitat ==
Predators rarely attack species of Trogidae. They avoid detection and predation due to their soil covering and motionless behavior. Birds prey upon hide beetles that have invaded the bird nests.

Species of Trogidae often feed on decomposing carcasses. Along with carrion, hide beetles are found within the pellet of many animal species, on other decaying dry matter, and around birds' and mammals' nests and feathers, as well as aging bones.

== Mating habits and life cycle ==
Little is known about the specifics of the Trogid life cycle. Female Trogids of several species produce chirping noises in order to attract males to their burrows for mating. After impregnation of the female by the male, the female lays the eggs and the larvae hatch after an unknown amount of time. During decomposition of a carcass, the beetles leave their nests to feed on the carrion. As the last succession of insects to appear on the carcass, both larvae and adults can be found feeding on the dry remains. At the site of the carcass, an impregnated female digs small, vertical columns underneath the carcass to lay her eggs, allowing the larvae to locate food after hatching. Trogidae usually have three to five instars.

== Forensic importance ==
The use of Trogidae in forensic entomology is unknown at this time. Though they typically arrive last in the order of succession, they can be the first in succession on burned and charred bodies. After the burned skin is eaten away by the trogids, the corpse (with now-exposed, "fresher" surfaces) allows for viable colonization by other forensically important insects that help determine accurate post mortem interval estimates.

Various species of Trogidae have been used by museums to clean up skeletons by eating any remaining dried material left on the skeletons, leaving them clean for display. This method of bone-stripping has been used by some museums for many years, as it is the most effective method.

== Research ==
The Chinese Academy of Sciences funded a study on the classification of this family of beetles. The forensic importance of African Trogidae and other carrion-associated beetles is being studied at the University of Pretoria. This project is investigating how the presence of beetles on carrion affects the infestation of other arthropods in carrion in Africa.

== Taxonomy ==
The family Trogidae contains the following subfamily and genera:

- †Avitortorinae Nikolajev, 2007
  - †Avitortor Ponomarenko, 1977
- †Kresnikinae Tihelka, Huang & Cai, 2020
  - †Kresnikus Tihelka, Huang & Cai, 2020
- Omorginae Nikolajev, 2005
  - †Cretomorgus Nikolajev, 2007
  - Omorgus Erichson, 1847
  - Polynoncus Burmeister, 1876
- †Prototroginae Nikolajev, 2000
  - †Prototrox Nikolajev, 2000
- Troginae MacLeay, 1819
  - Glyptotrox Nikolajev, 2016
  - †Paratrox Nikolajev, 2009
  - Phoberus MacLeay, 1819
  - Trox Fabricius, 1775
