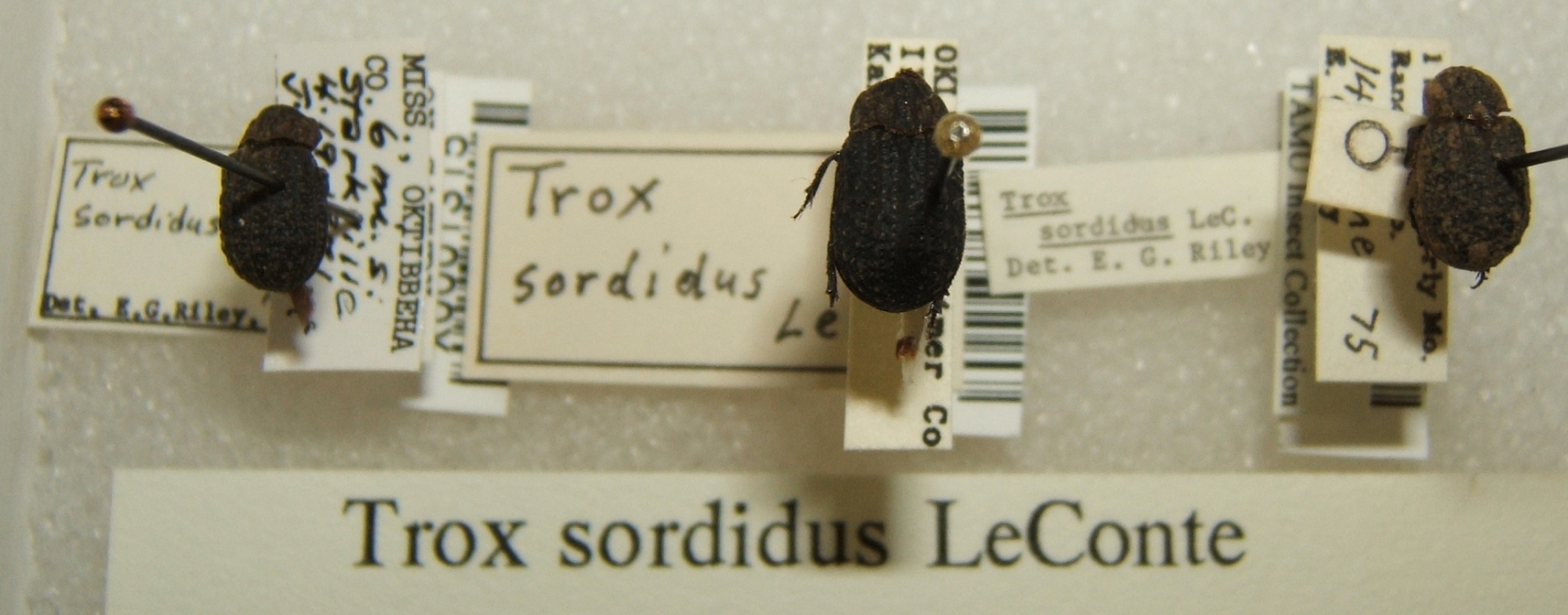
- Trox sordidus, adult

Scientific classification
- Kingdom: Animalia
- Phylum: Arthropoda
- Class: Insecta
- Order: Coleoptera
- Suborder: Polyphaga
- Infraorder: Scarabaeiformia
- Family: Trogidae
- Subfamily: Troginae
- Genus: Trox
- Species: T. sordidus

Binomial name
- Trox sordidus LeConte, 1854

= Trox sordidus =

Species of beetle

Trox sordidus is a beetle of the Family Trogidae. Trox sordidus was described by John LeConte in 1854, who observed the species in the U.S. states of Georgia, New York and Kansas.
