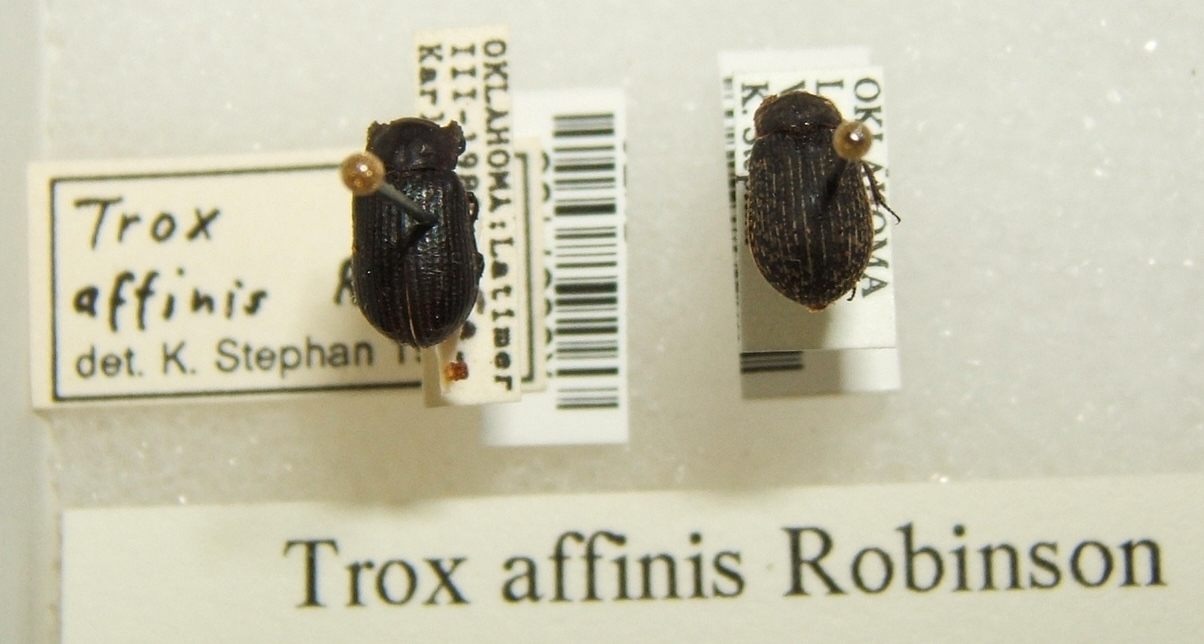
- Trox affinis, adult

Scientific classification
- Kingdom: Animalia
- Phylum: Arthropoda
- Class: Insecta
- Order: Coleoptera
- Suborder: Polyphaga
- Infraorder: Scarabaeiformia
- Family: Trogidae
- Subfamily: Troginae
- Genus: Trox
- Species: T. affinis

Binomial name
- Trox affinis Robinson, 1940

= Trox affinis =

Species of beetle

Trox affinis is a beetle of the family Trogidae.
