= Trox fascifer =

Scientific classification
- Domain: Eukaryota
- Kingdom: Animalia
- Phylum: Arthropoda
- Class: Insecta
- Order: Coleoptera
- Suborder: Polyphaga
- Infraorder: Scarabaeiformia
- Family: Trogidae
- Subfamily: Troginae
- Genus: Trox
- Species: T. fascifer

Binomial name
- Trox fascifer Leconte, 1854

Species of beetle

Trox fascifer is a species of hide beetle in the family Trogidae. It is found in North America.
