= Trox confluens =

Scientific classification
- Domain: Eukaryota
- Kingdom: Animalia
- Phylum: Arthropoda
- Class: Insecta
- Order: Coleoptera
- Suborder: Polyphaga
- Infraorder: Scarabaeiformia
- Family: Trogidae
- Subfamily: Troginae
- Genus: Trox
- Species: T. confluens

Binomial name
- Trox confluens Wollaston, 1864

Species of beetle

Trox confluens is a species of hide beetle in the subfamily Troginae. Within the genus Trox, it is placed in the subgenus Granulitrox. Though this species is disputed, with some taxonomists arguing T. confluens is merely a duplicate of Trox granulipennis, the general consensus is that T. confluens and T. granulipennis are distinct. This beetle lives in Algeria, the Canary Islands, Libya, Morocco, and Tunisia.
