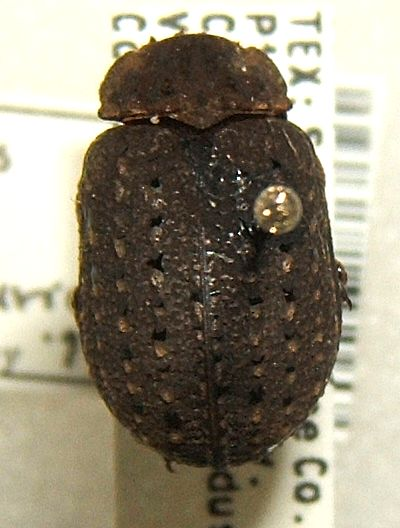
- Omorgus howelli, adult

Scientific classification
- Kingdom: Animalia
- Phylum: Arthropoda
- Clade: Pancrustacea
- Class: Insecta
- Order: Coleoptera
- Suborder: Polyphaga
- Infraorder: Scarabaeiformia
- Family: Trogidae
- Genus: Omorgus
- Species: O. howelli

Binomial name
- Omorgus howelli (Howden & Vaurie, 1957)

Synonyms
- Trox howelli

= Omorgus howelli =

Species of beetle

Omorgus howelli is a beetle of the Family Trogidae occurring in Florida and Texas. As of 2006 it is considered to belong to genus Omorgus, having previously been classified under the genus Trox.
