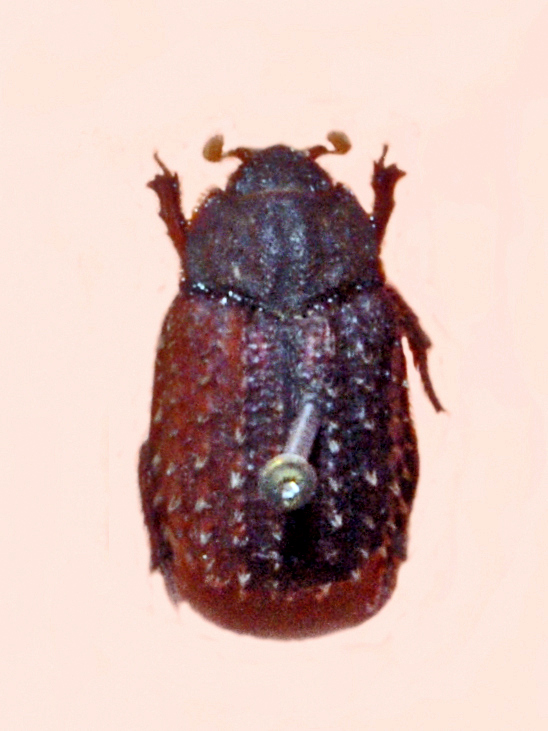
- Trox hispidus. Museum specimen

Scientific classification
- Domain: Eukaryota
- Kingdom: Animalia
- Phylum: Arthropoda
- Class: Insecta
- Order: Coleoptera
- Suborder: Polyphaga
- Infraorder: Scarabaeiformia
- Family: Trogidae
- Subfamily: Troginae
- Genus: Trox
- Species: T. hispidus

Binomial name
- Trox hispidus (Pontoppidan, 1763)

Synonyms
- Trox arenarius Paykull, 1798; Trox luridus Rossi, 1790

= Trox hispidus =

Species of beetle

Trox hispidus is a beetle of the family Trogidae.

== Subspecies ==
- Trox hispidus hispidus (Pontoppidan, 1763)
- Trox hispidus mixtus Harold, 1872

== Description ==
Trox hispidus can reach a length of 9–11 millimetres (0.35–0.43 in). The dorsal surface is convex and very rough, with ridges and tubercles, dark brown in color. On the body and legs this species has pale yellowish-white bristles.

== Distribution ==
This species is present in most of Europe. These very rare beetles can be found in nests of birds of prey.
