= Trox acanthinus =

Scientific classification
- Domain: Eukaryota
- Kingdom: Animalia
- Phylum: Arthropoda
- Class: Insecta
- Order: Coleoptera
- Suborder: Polyphaga
- Infraorder: Scarabaeiformia
- Family: Trogidae
- Subfamily: Troginae
- Genus: Trox
- Species: T. acanthinus

Binomial name
- Trox acanthinus Harold 1872

Species of beetle

Trox acanthinus is a species of hide beetle in the subfamily Troginae.
