= Trox setifer =

Scientific classification
- Domain: Eukaryota
- Kingdom: Animalia
- Phylum: Arthropoda
- Class: Insecta
- Order: Coleoptera
- Suborder: Polyphaga
- Infraorder: Scarabaeiformia
- Family: Trogidae
- Subfamily: Troginae
- Genus: Trox
- Species: T. cadaverinus

Binomial name
- Trox cadaverinus Waterhouse, 1875

Species of beetle

Trox setifer is a species of hide beetle in the subfamily Troginae. Within the genus Trox, it is placed in the core subgenus Trox.
