= Trox sibericus =

Scientific classification
- Domain: Eukaryota
- Kingdom: Animalia
- Phylum: Arthropoda
- Class: Insecta
- Order: Coleoptera
- Suborder: Polyphaga
- Infraorder: Scarabaeiformia
- Family: Trogidae
- Subfamily: Troginae
- Genus: Trox
- Species: T. sibericus

Binomial name
- Trox sibericus Nikolajev, 2007

Species of beetle

Trox sibericus is an extinct species of hide beetle in the subfamily Troginae.
