= Trox perrisii =

Scientific classification
- Kingdom: Animalia
- Phylum: Arthropoda
- Class: Insecta
- Order: Coleoptera
- Suborder: Polyphaga
- Infraorder: Scarabaeiformia
- Family: Trogidae
- Subfamily: Troginae
- Genus: Trox
- Species: T. perrisii

Binomial name
- Trox perrisii Fairmaire, 1868

Species of beetle

Trox perrisii is a species of hide beetle in the subfamily Troginae. Within the genus Trox, it is placed in the subgenus Niditrox.

== Bibliography ==
- Koren, Toni (2015-12-18). "The First Record of Trox perrisii Fairmaire, 1868 in Croatia". Entomologia Croatica. 19 (1–2): 31–35. eISSN 1849-0441.
