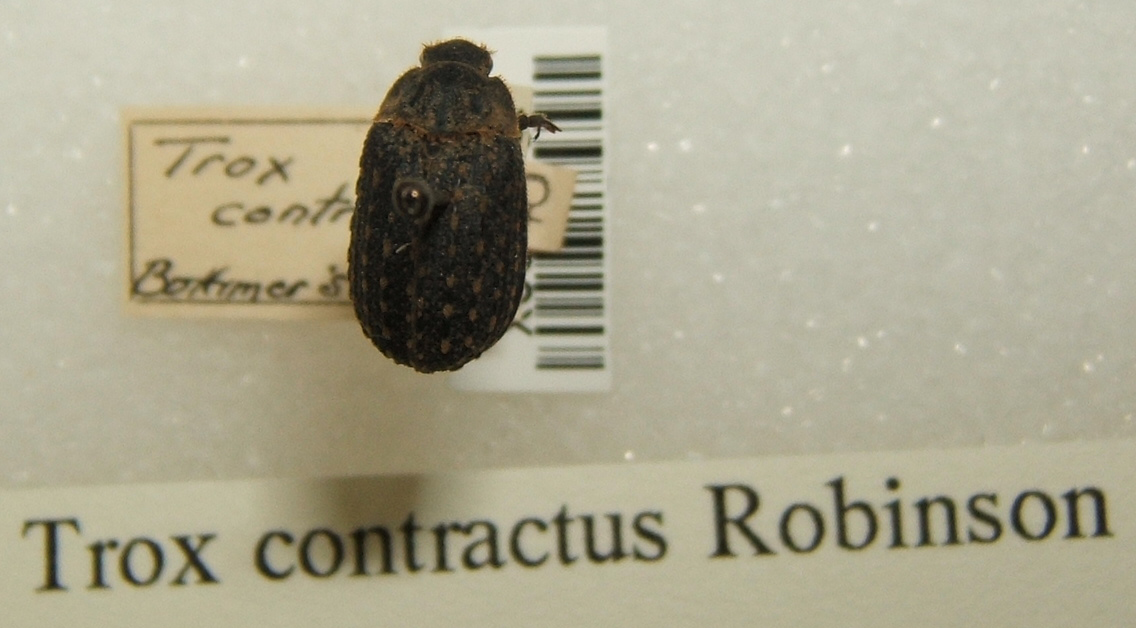
- Trox contractus, adult

Scientific classification
- Kingdom: Animalia
- Phylum: Arthropoda
- Clade: Pancrustacea
- Class: Insecta
- Order: Coleoptera
- Suborder: Polyphaga
- Infraorder: Scarabaeiformia
- Family: Trogidae
- Genus: Trox
- Species: T. contractus

Binomial name
- Trox contractus Robinson, 1940

= Trox contractus =

Species of beetle

Trox contractus is a beetle of the Family Trogidae.

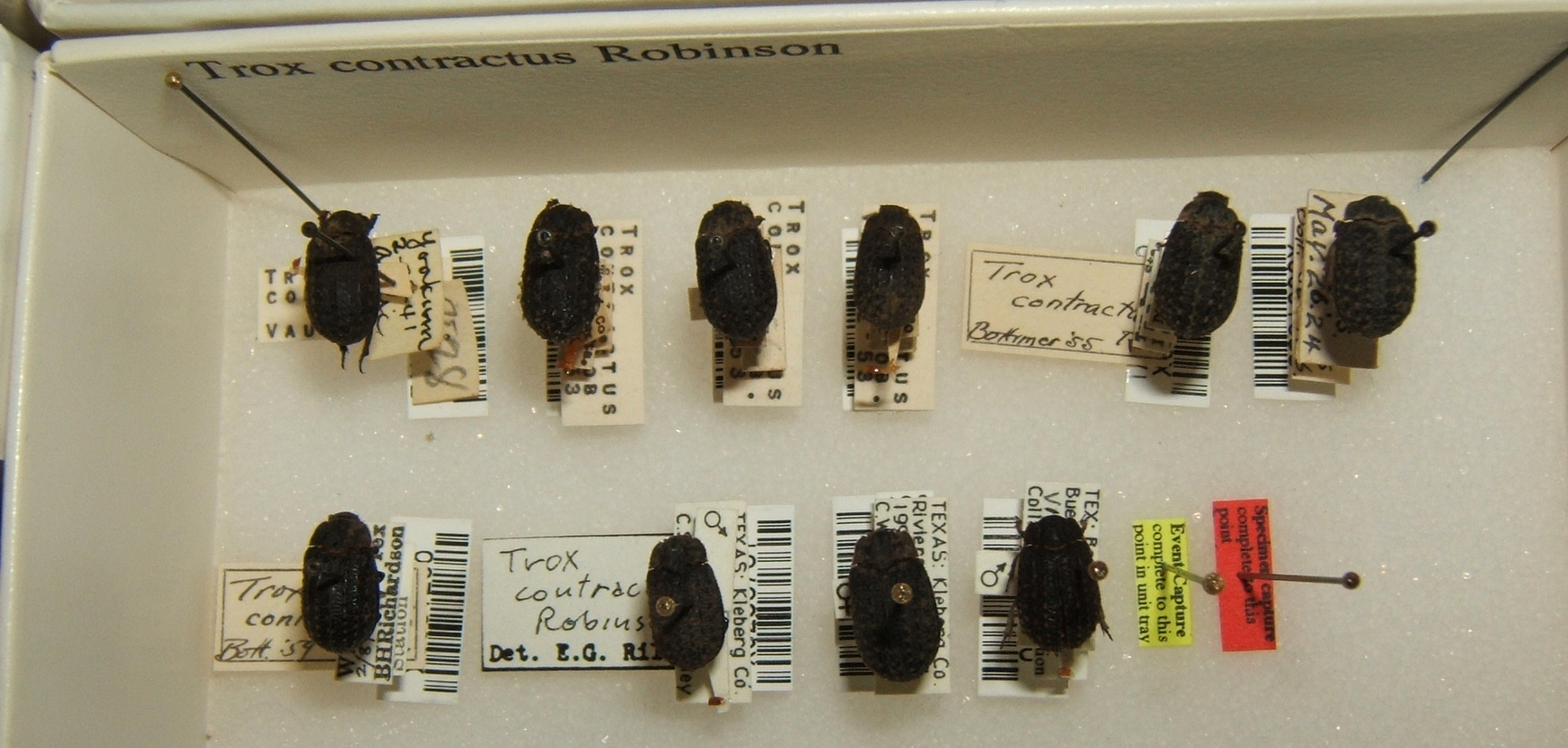
Trox contractus variation
