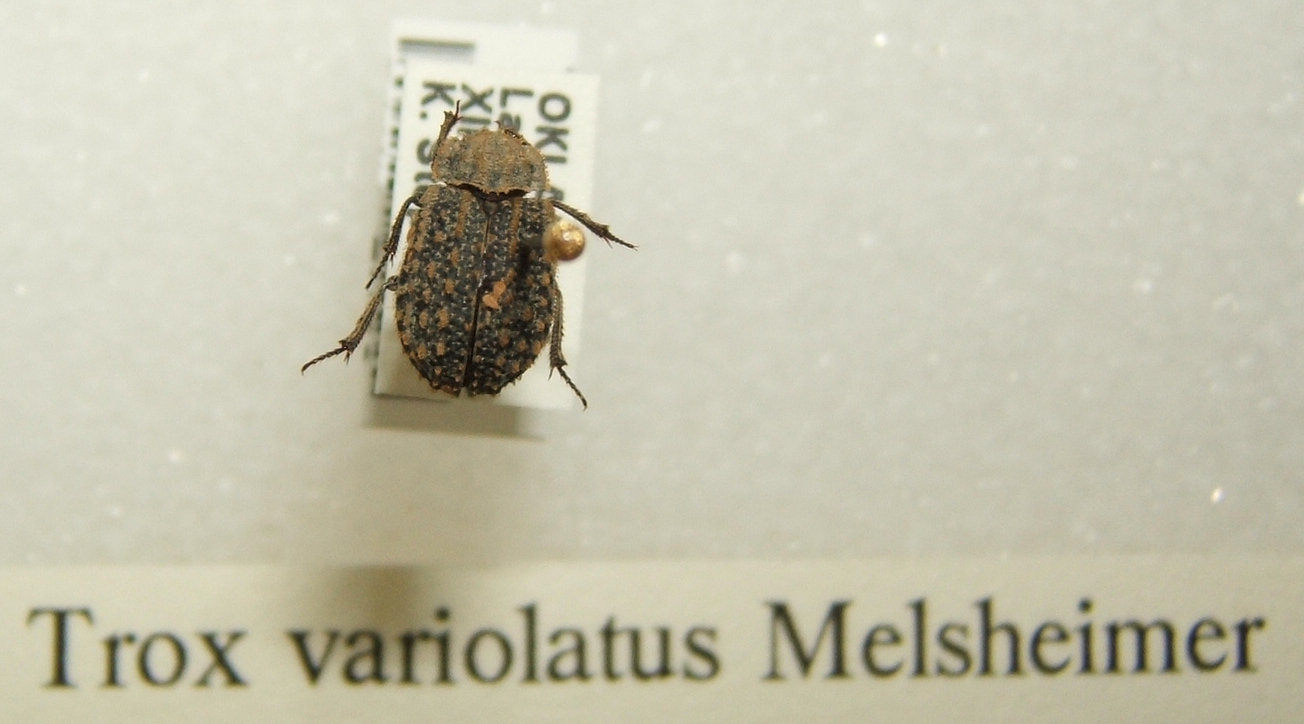
- Trox variolatus, adult

Scientific classification
- Kingdom: Animalia
- Phylum: Arthropoda
- Clade: Pancrustacea
- Class: Insecta
- Order: Coleoptera
- Suborder: Polyphaga
- Infraorder: Scarabaeiformia
- Family: Trogidae
- Genus: Trox
- Species: T. variolatus

Binomial name
- Trox variolatus Melsheimer, 1846

= Trox variolatus =

Species of beetle

Trox variolatus is a beetle of the family Trogidae, the hide beetles. It is found in North America.

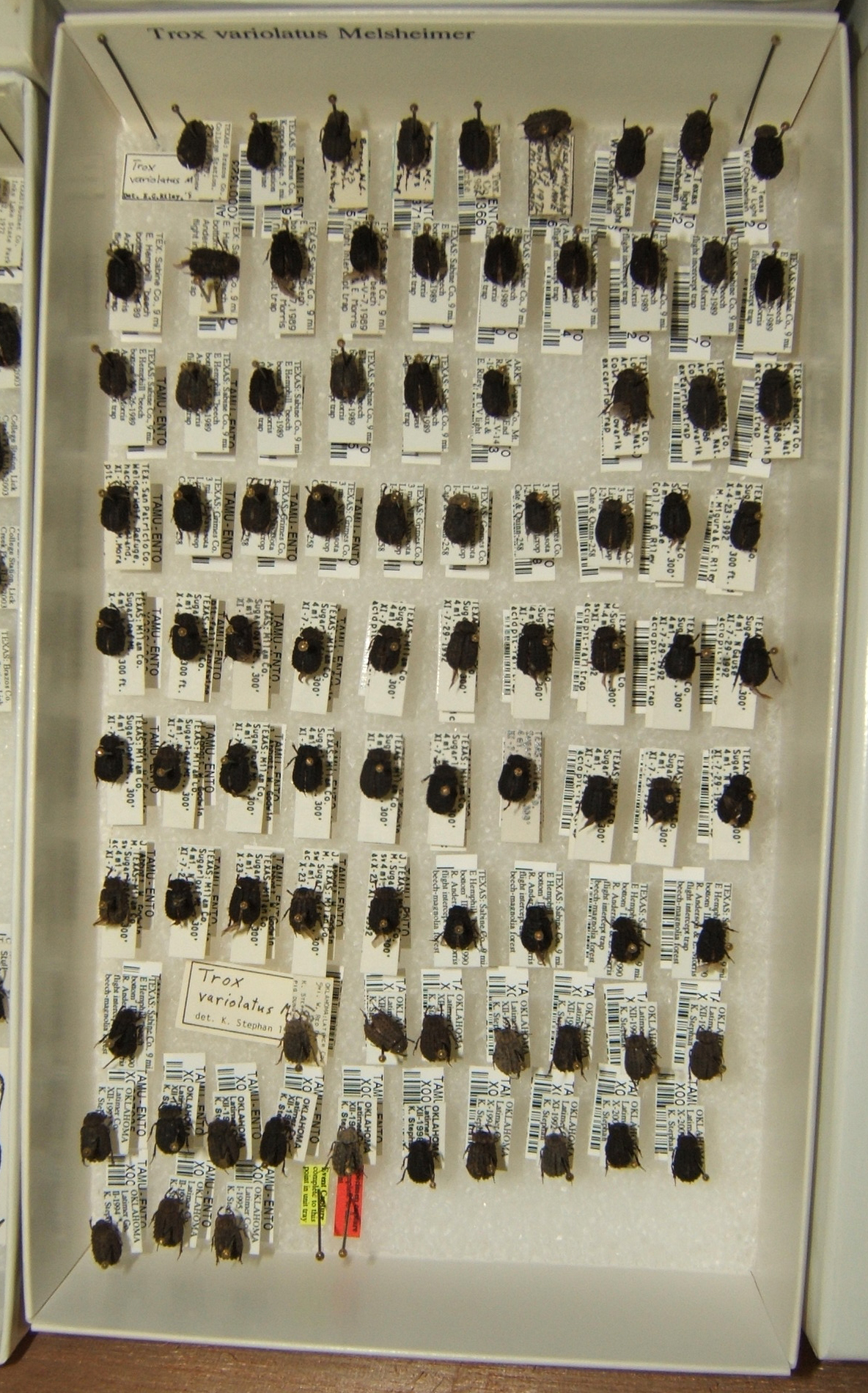
Trox variolatus variation
