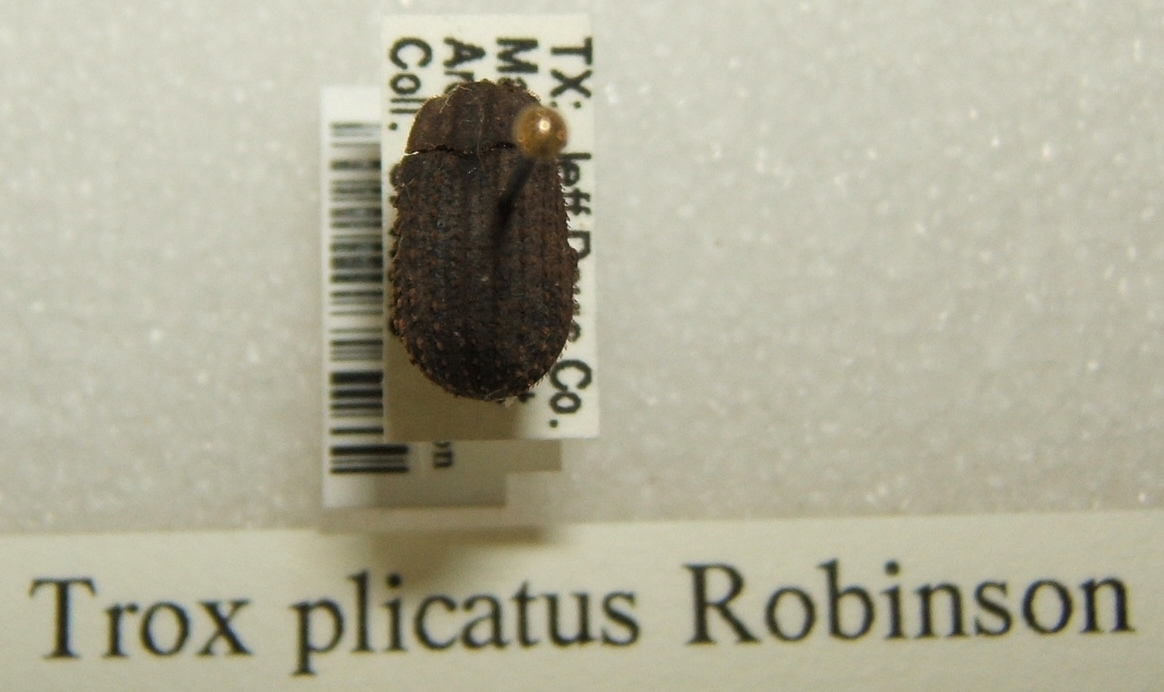
- Trox plicatus, adult

Scientific classification
- Kingdom: Animalia
- Phylum: Arthropoda
- Clade: Pancrustacea
- Class: Insecta
- Order: Coleoptera
- Suborder: Polyphaga
- Infraorder: Scarabaeiformia
- Family: Trogidae
- Genus: Trox
- Species: T. plicatus

Binomial name
- Trox plicatus Robinson, 1940

= Trox plicatus =

Species of beetle

Trox plicatus is a beetle of the family Trogidae.

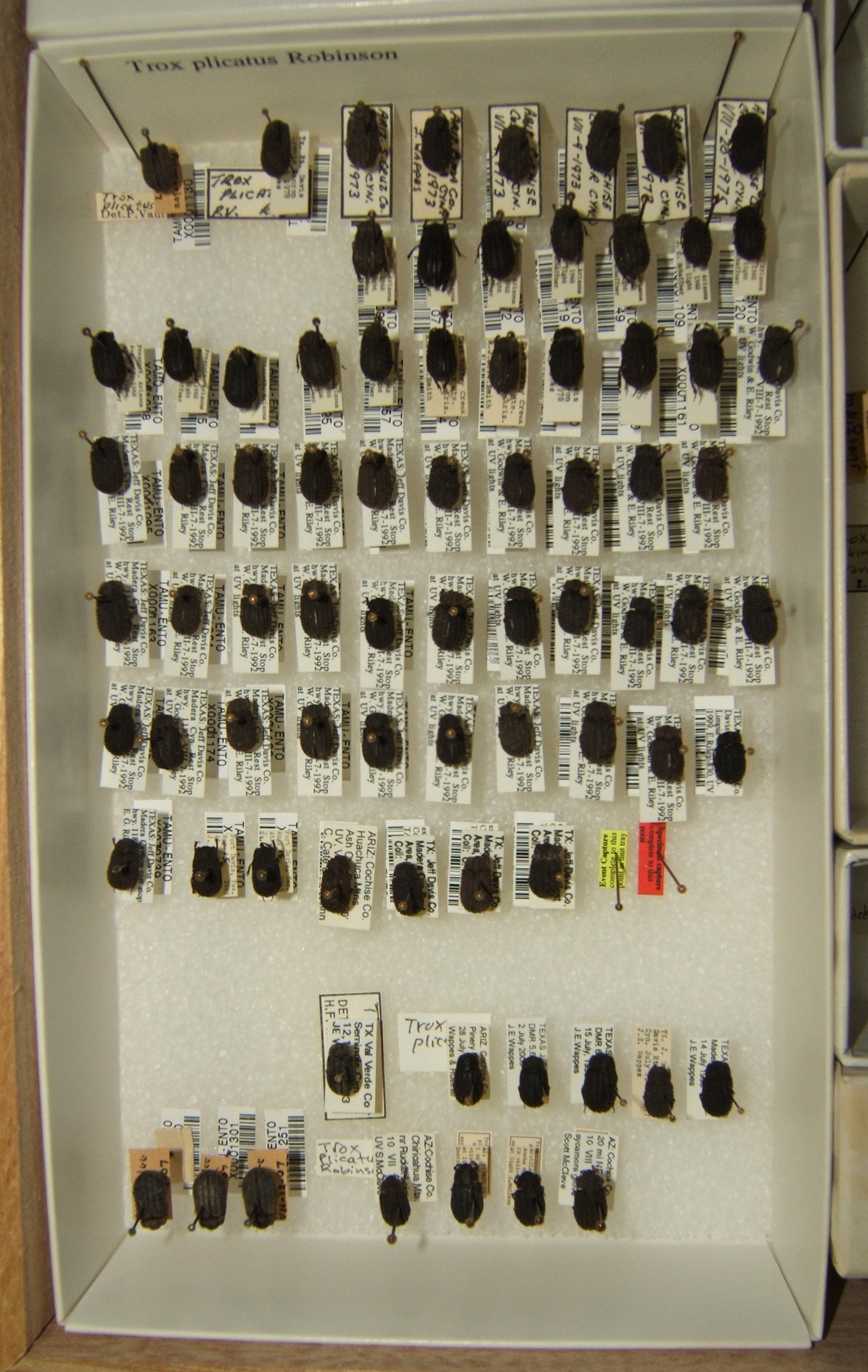
Trox plicatus variation
