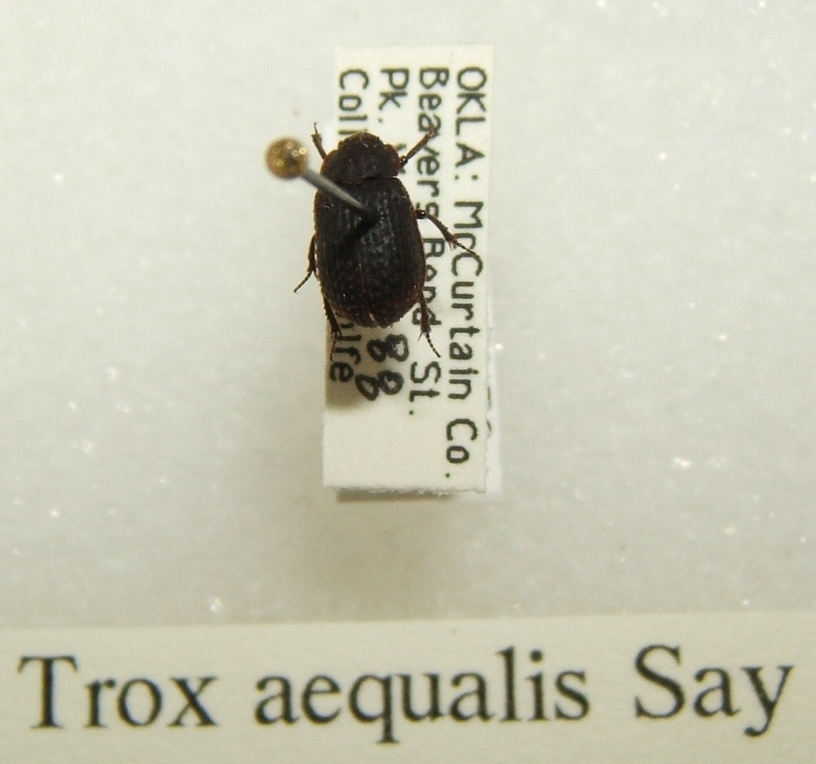
- Trox aequalis, adult

Scientific classification
- Kingdom: Animalia
- Phylum: Arthropoda
- Clade: Pancrustacea
- Class: Insecta
- Order: Coleoptera
- Suborder: Polyphaga
- Infraorder: Scarabaeiformia
- Family: Trogidae
- Genus: Trox
- Species: T. aequalis

Binomial name
- Trox aequalis Say, 1831

= Trox aequalis =

Species of beetle

Trox aequalis is a beetle of the family Trogidae. It is found in North America (northern Mexico, United States, Canada).

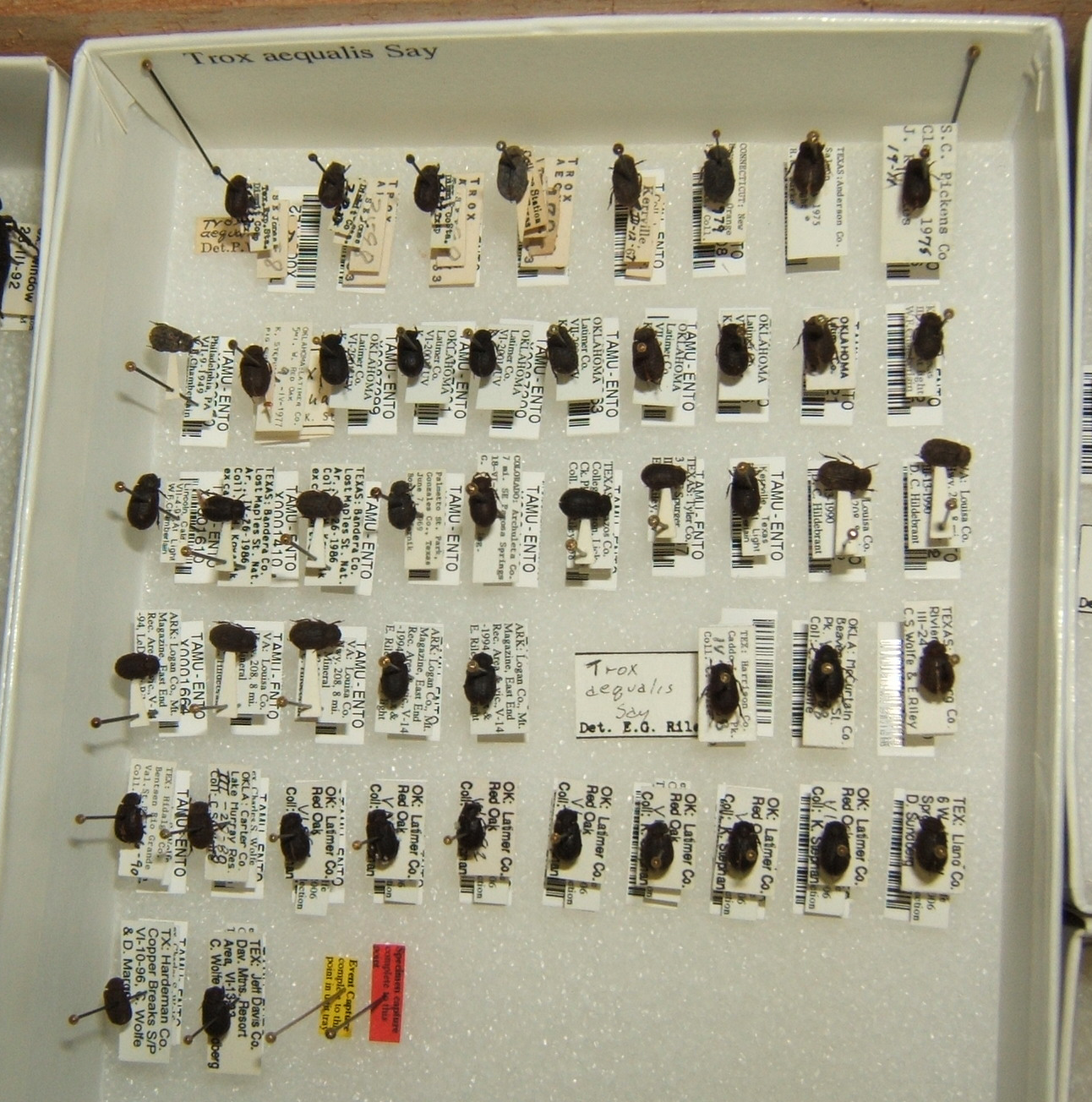
Trox aequalis variation
