= Trox floridanus =

Scientific classification
- Kingdom: Animalia
- Phylum: Arthropoda
- Clade: Pancrustacea
- Class: Insecta
- Order: Coleoptera
- Suborder: Polyphaga
- Infraorder: Scarabaeiformia
- Family: Trogidae
- Genus: Trox
- Species: T. floridanus

Binomial name
- Trox floridanus Howden & Vaurie, 1957

Species of beetle

Trox floridanus is a species of hide beetle in the family Trogidae. It is found in North America.
