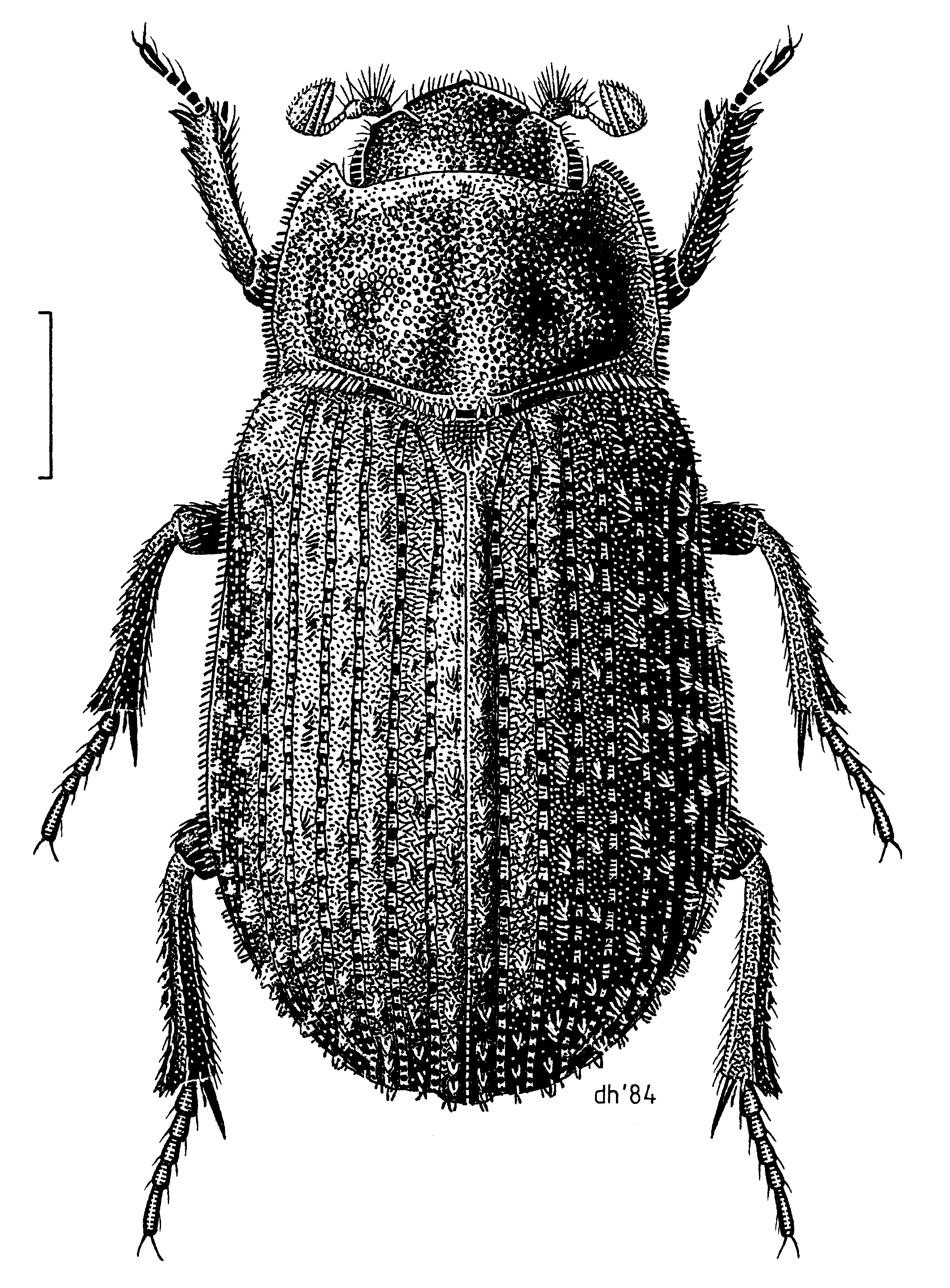
- Illustration by Des Helmore

Scientific classification
- Kingdom: Animalia
- Phylum: Arthropoda
- Clade: Pancrustacea
- Class: Insecta
- Order: Coleoptera
- Suborder: Polyphaga
- Infraorder: Scarabaeiformia
- Family: Trogidae
- Genus: Trox
- Species: T. scaber

Binomial name
- Trox scaber (Linnaeus, 1767)

= Trox scaber =

Species of beetle

Trox scaber is a beetle of the family Trogidae. The 5 to 8 mm long insect is found worldwide, including in Europe, and lives in bird nests.

The elytra and pronotum are roughly sculptured, and there are bristly scales on the elytral ridges. The larvae develop in tawny owl and other owl nests but also in the hollow tree nests of jackdaw, woodpecker and others. They feed mainly on small dry carcasses, especially when dry.

== Name and classification ==
Trox scaber was previously put in the Scarabaeidae because of the similarity of its antennae to that of members of this family. The genus Trox has 46 species throughout the world. In Europe, there are 21 species, all belonging to the subgenus Trox. There are about 8 in Central Europe. The name Trox (from the Ancient Greek τροξ, meaning "chewer") may have been given because the mandible is forked. It is described by Fabricius as Maxilla bifida. The species name scaber (Latin scaber = rough) alludes to the rough surface of the elytra.

== Appearance ==
The beetle is brown to black-brown. The antennae are rust red. The bristles are brownish-yellow and not black. The body is short, obovate and dome-shaped.

The head is recessed into the pronotum. The antennae have 10 segments. The last 3 segments form a fan and, because of the fine hairs, are not shiny. The first flagellomere is long and slightly undermined underneath. The mouthparts point downwards and are not level with the clypeus. The mandible is short, with small, nearly smooth masticatory processes. The maxillary palpi are rather short, and the terminal segment is elongated. The third segment of the labial palpus is rounded.

The lateral and basal margins of the pronotum are bordered. The sides are edged with short bristles. At the base are less regular, somewhat longer bristles. The curved disc is coarsely sculpted and also has rows of bristles.

The elytra cover the telson. Each elytron bears 10 thin, even and shallowly punctured stripes. Between these are alternatingly about four times as wide, higher arched and about three times as wide, less curved spaces. On each of the higher, wider surfaces is a row of small humps, which are occupied with short, strong bristles. On the narrower sections, there are no humps and the bristles are much sparser and found as a row of very small tufts of bristles. The sides of the elytra are bordered with a row of short bristles.

Between the forelegs, the pronotum is posteriorly extended. This prosternal process is short and pointy. Only 5 sternites can be found on the abdomen. The coxae of the middle legs are very small and round. The legs have five-segmented tarsi. The outer edges of the tibiae of the front legs are serrated, which hints that they are fossorial legs.

== Living habits ==
The heat-loving beetles can make chirping noises by rubbing the abdomen on the elytra. The species is mainly found in the substructure of older large birds' nests, but are also found in smaller bird nests, bird carcasses and hides, which they gnaw on. Occasionally, they are also found at the entrance of underground animal dens. The adults fly only grudgingly.

== Distribution ==
The species is found almost worldwide. In Central Europe, they are common in low-elevation terrain and are rare to the Alps.

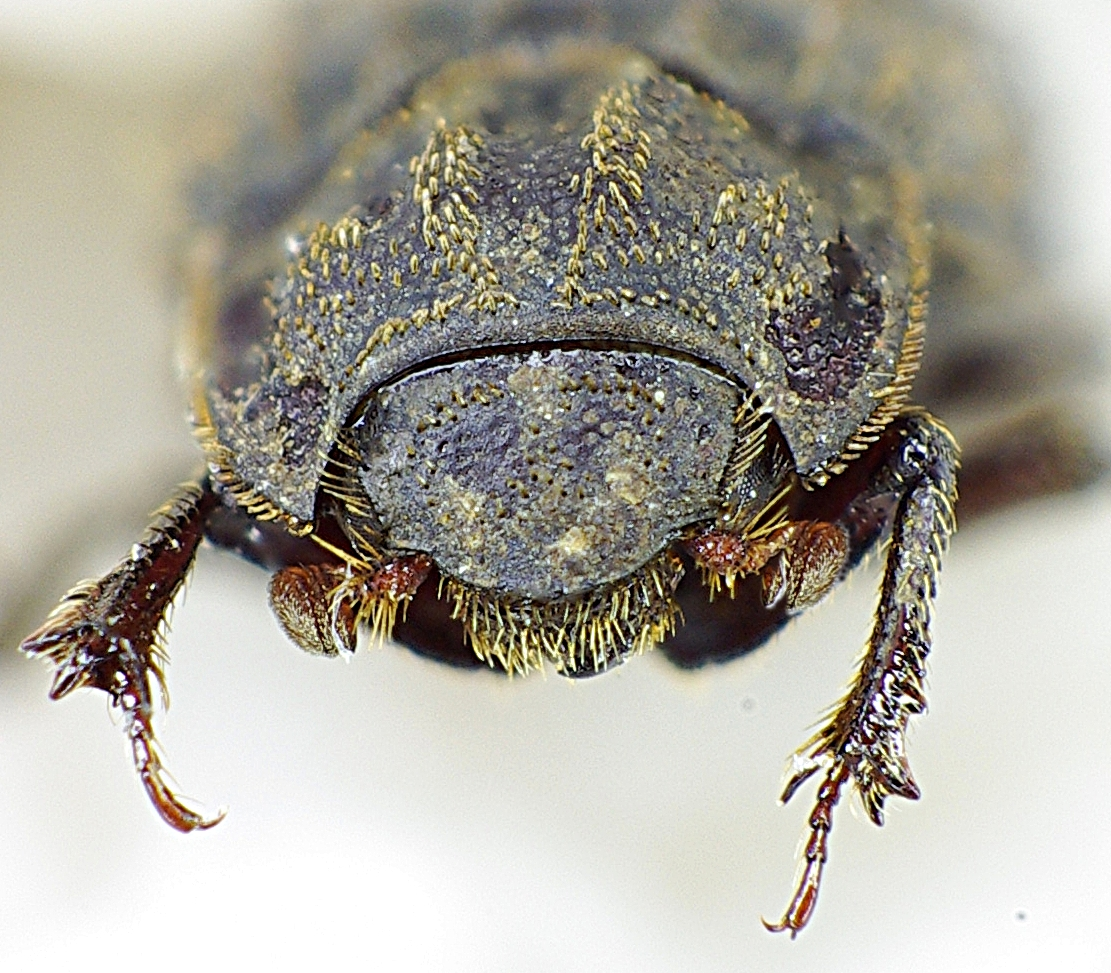
head

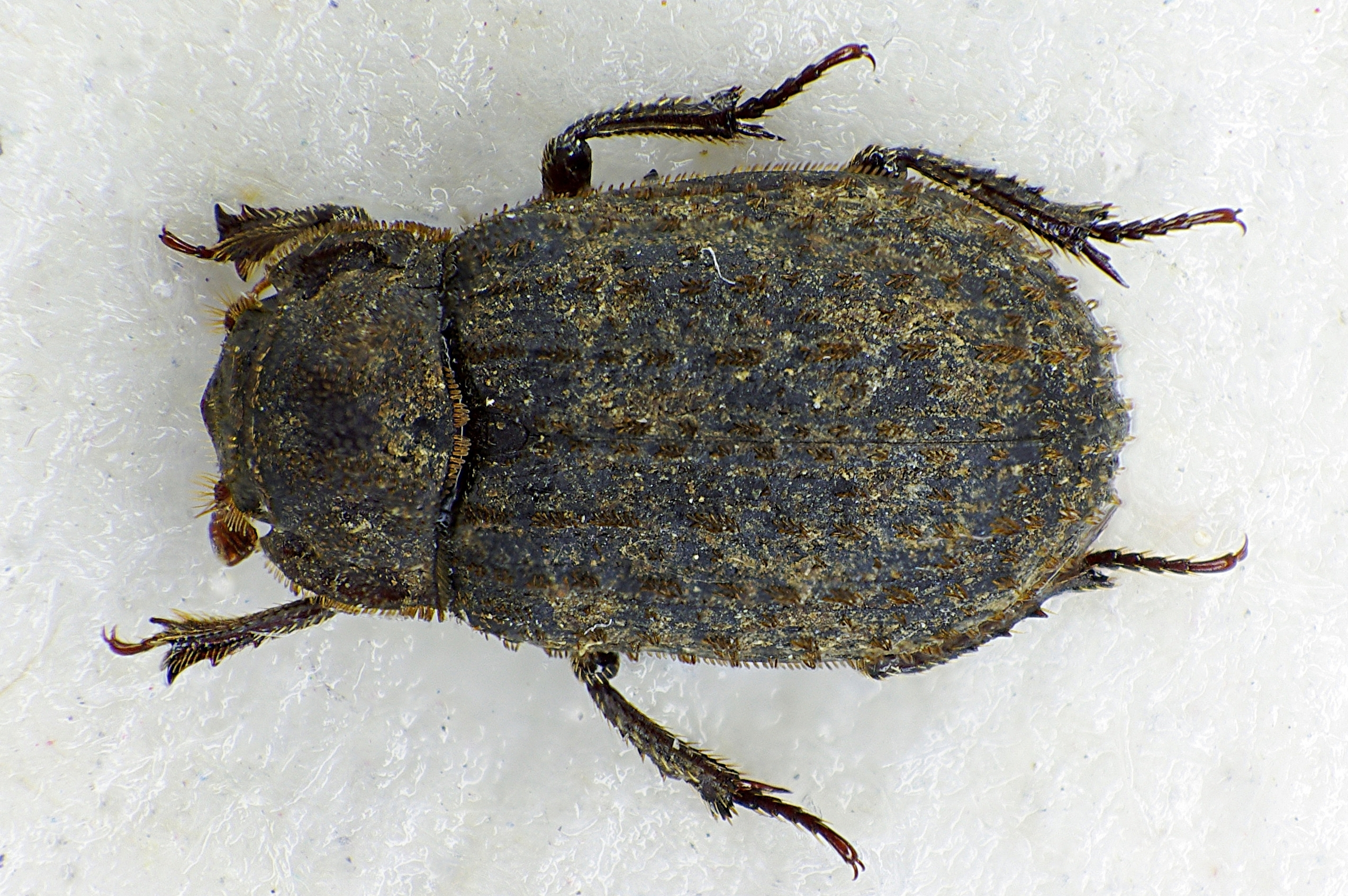
dorsal

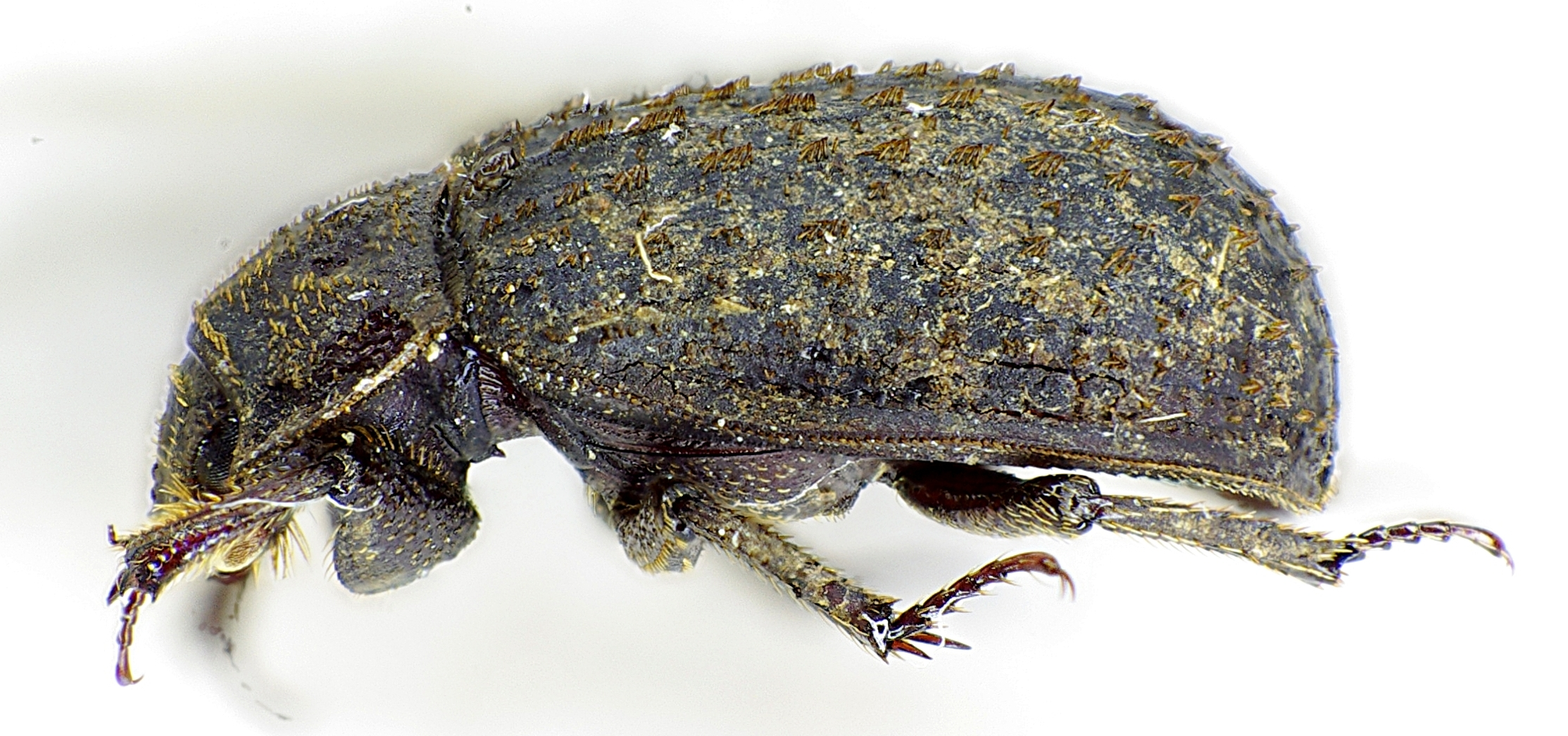
side

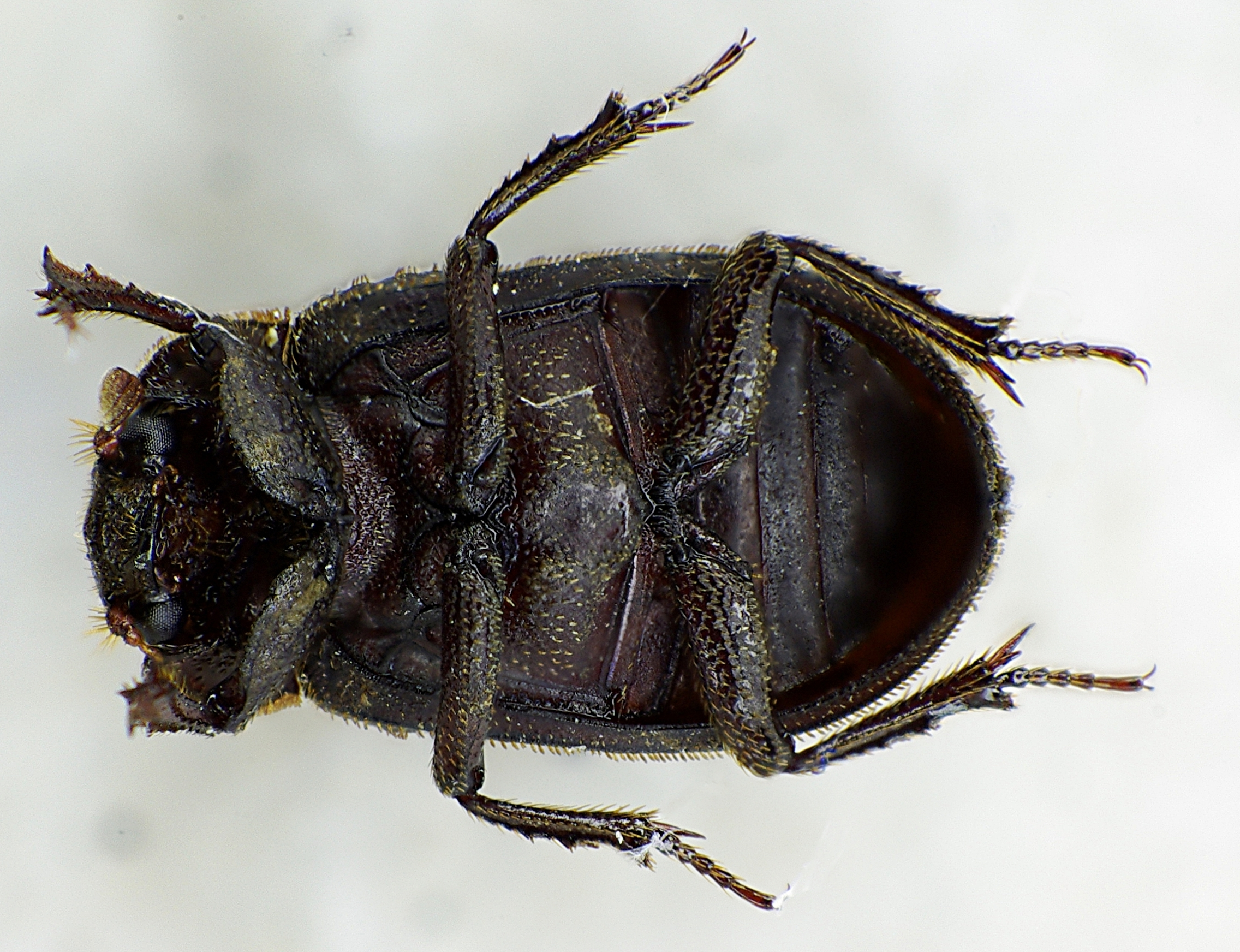
underside

== Literature ==
- Heinz Freude, Karl Wilhelm Harde, Gustav Adolf Lohse (Hrsg.): Die Käfer Mitteleuropas. Band 8. Teredilia Heteromera Lamellicornia. Elsevier, Spektrum, Akademischer Verlag, München 1969, ISBN 3-8274-0682-X.
- Gustav Jäger (Hrsg.): C. G. Calwer's Käferbuch. K. Thienemanns, Stuttgart 1876, 3. Auflage.
- Klaus Koch: Die Käfer Mitteleuropas Ökologie. 1. Auflage. Band 2. Goecke & Evers, Krefeld 1989, ISBN 3-87263-040-7.
