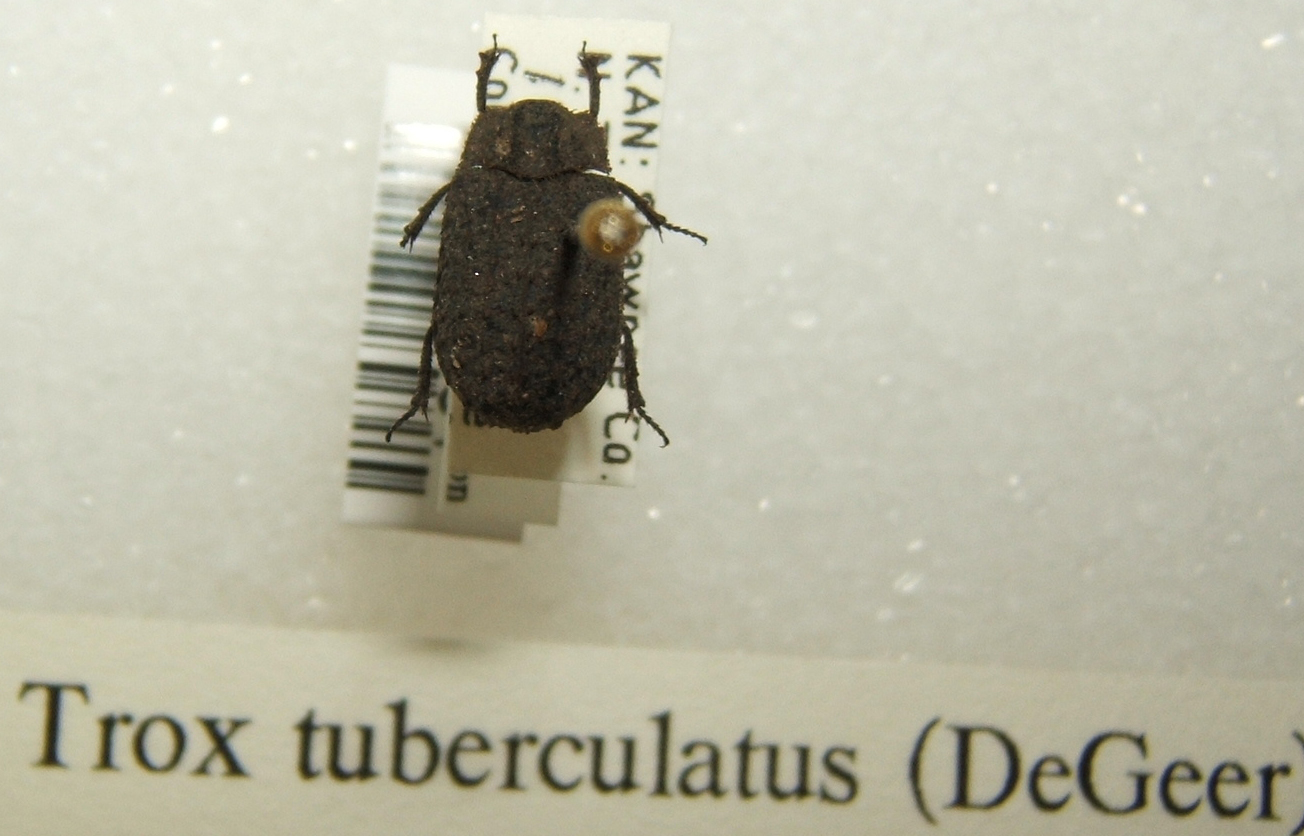
- Trox tuberculatus, adult

Scientific classification
- Kingdom: Animalia
- Phylum: Arthropoda
- Clade: Pancrustacea
- Class: Insecta
- Order: Coleoptera
- Suborder: Polyphaga
- Infraorder: Scarabaeiformia
- Family: Trogidae
- Genus: Trox
- Species: T. tuberculatus

Binomial name
- Trox tuberculatus (De Geer, 1774)

= Trox tuberculatus =

Species of beetle

Trox tuberculatus is a beetle of the Family Trogidae.

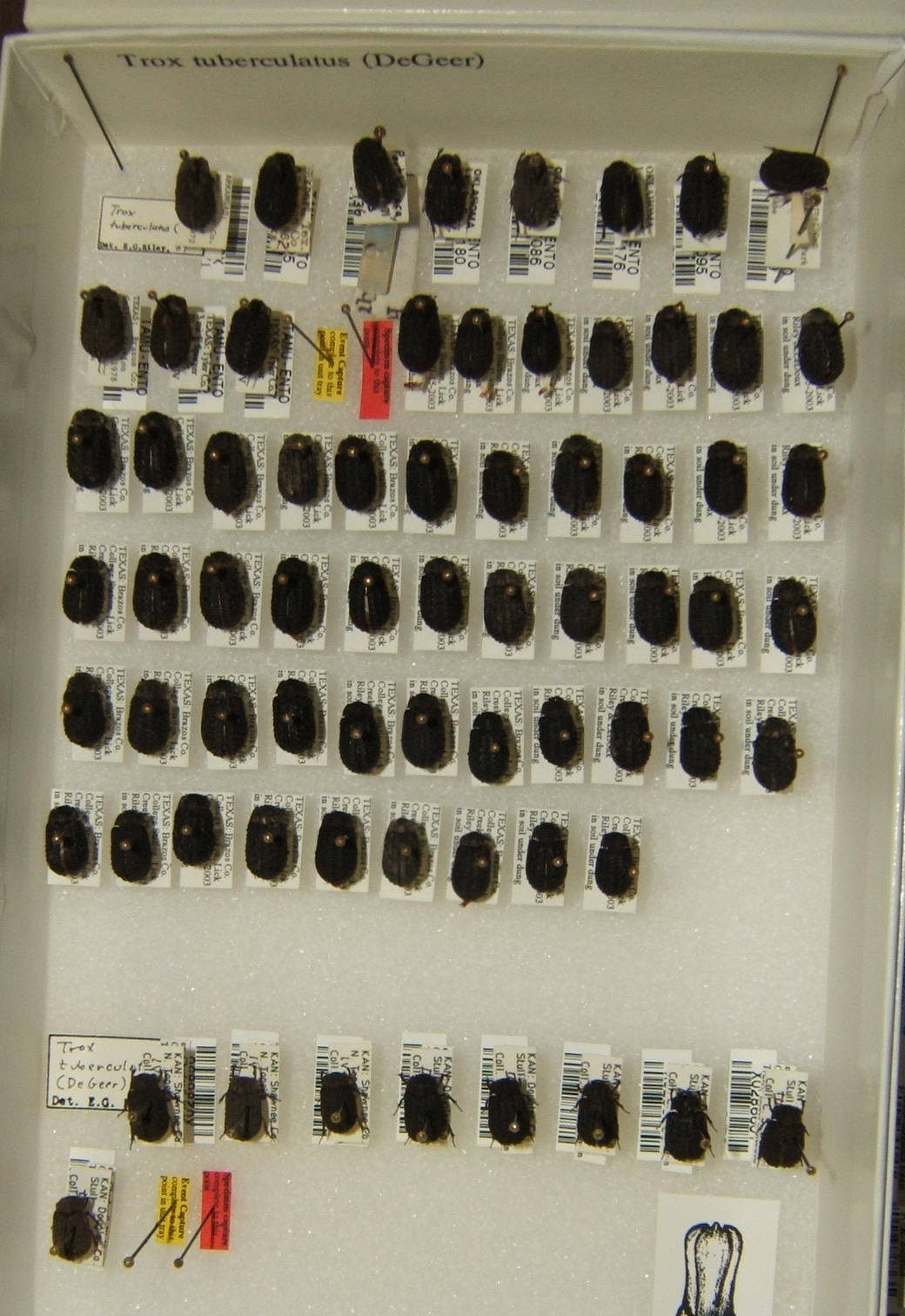
Trox tuberculatus variation
