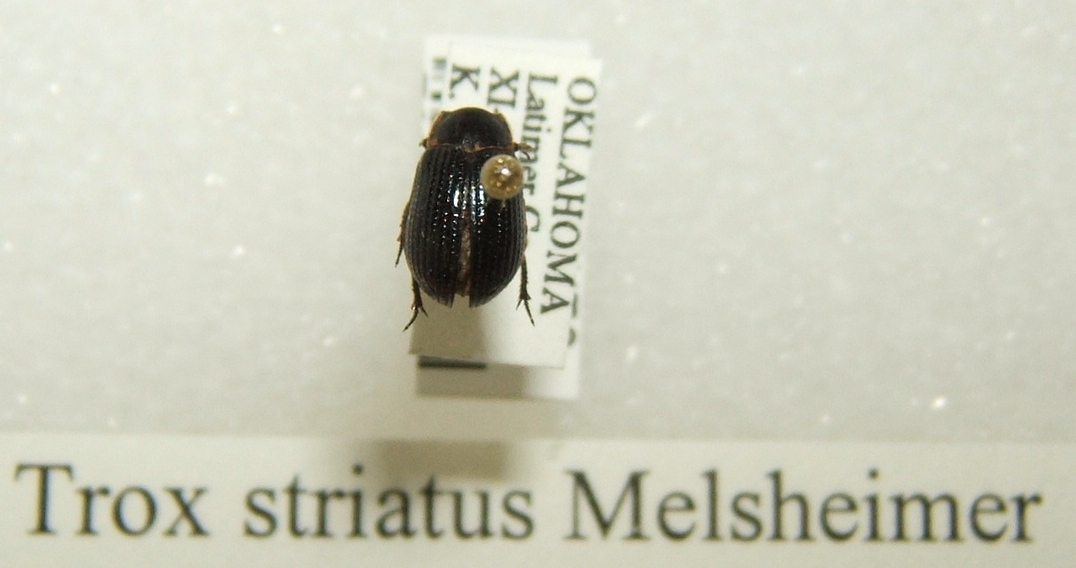
- Trox striatus, adult

Scientific classification
- Kingdom: Animalia
- Phylum: Arthropoda
- Clade: Pancrustacea
- Class: Insecta
- Order: Coleoptera
- Suborder: Polyphaga
- Infraorder: Scarabaeiformia
- Family: Trogidae
- Genus: Trox
- Species: T. striatus

Binomial name
- Trox striatus Melsheimer, 1846

= Trox striatus =

Species of beetle

Trox striatus is a beetle of the family Trogidae.

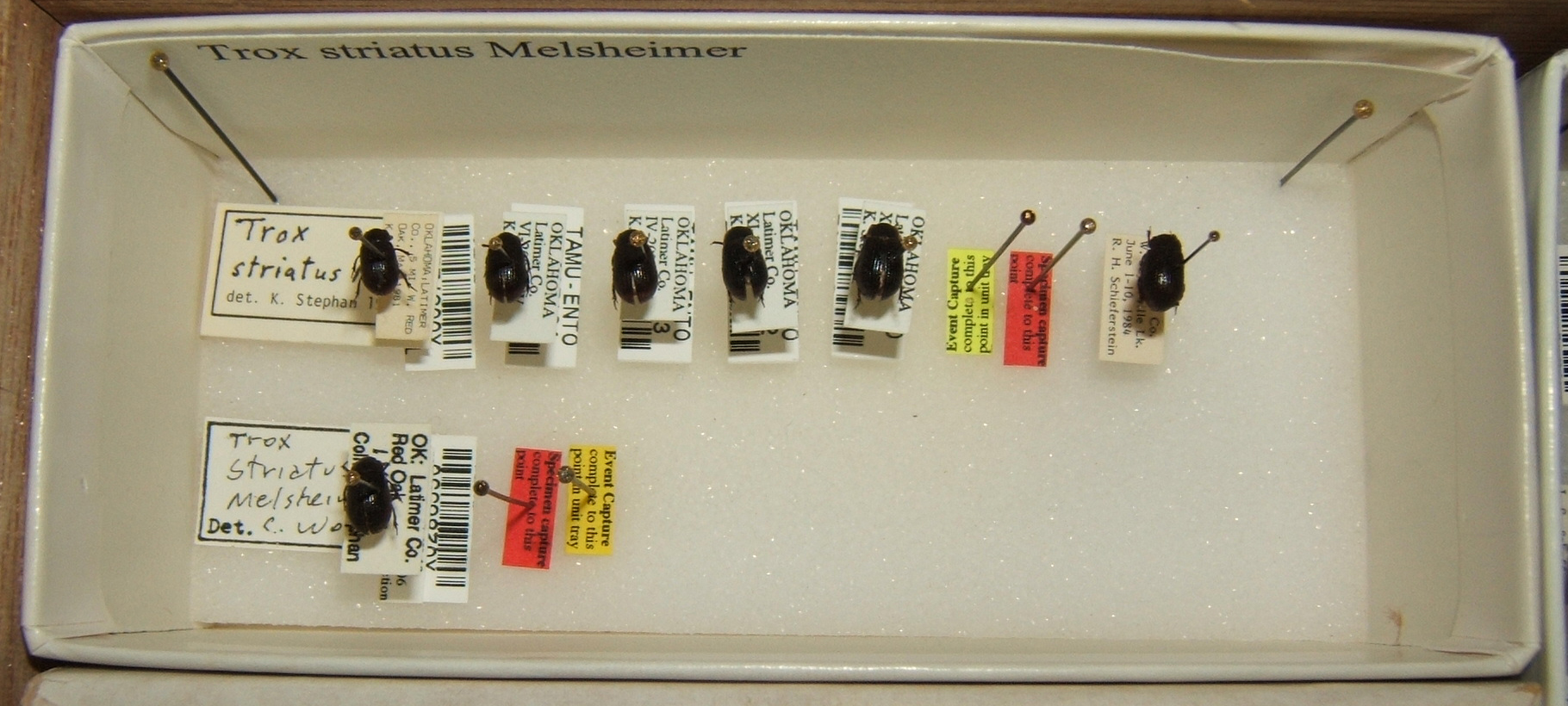
Trox striatus variation
