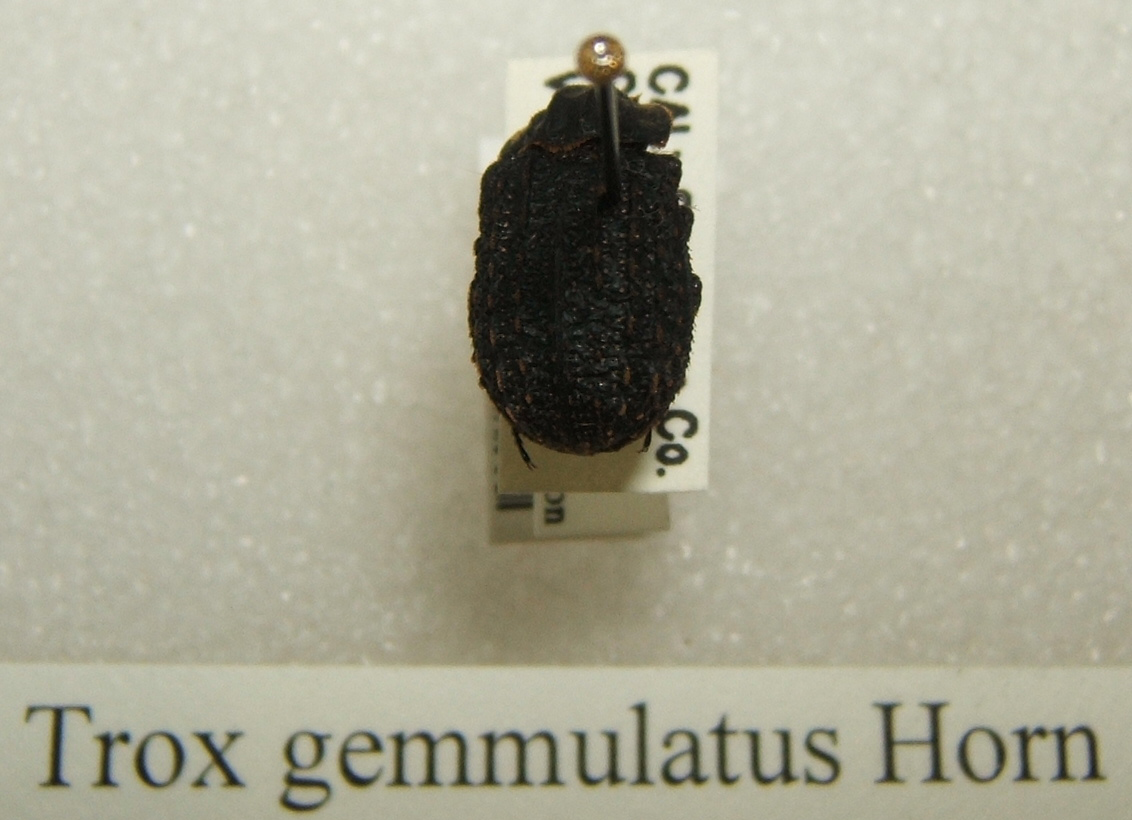
- Trox gemmulatus, adult

Scientific classification
- Kingdom: Animalia
- Phylum: Arthropoda
- Clade: Pancrustacea
- Class: Insecta
- Order: Coleoptera
- Suborder: Polyphaga
- Infraorder: Scarabaeiformia
- Family: Trogidae
- Genus: Trox
- Species: T. gemmulatus

Binomial name
- Trox gemmulatus Horn, 1874

= Trox gemmulatus =

Species of beetle

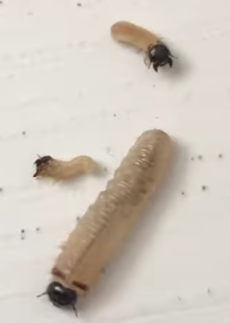
captive bred trox gemmulatus larvae

Trox gemmulatus is a beetle of the family Trogidae.

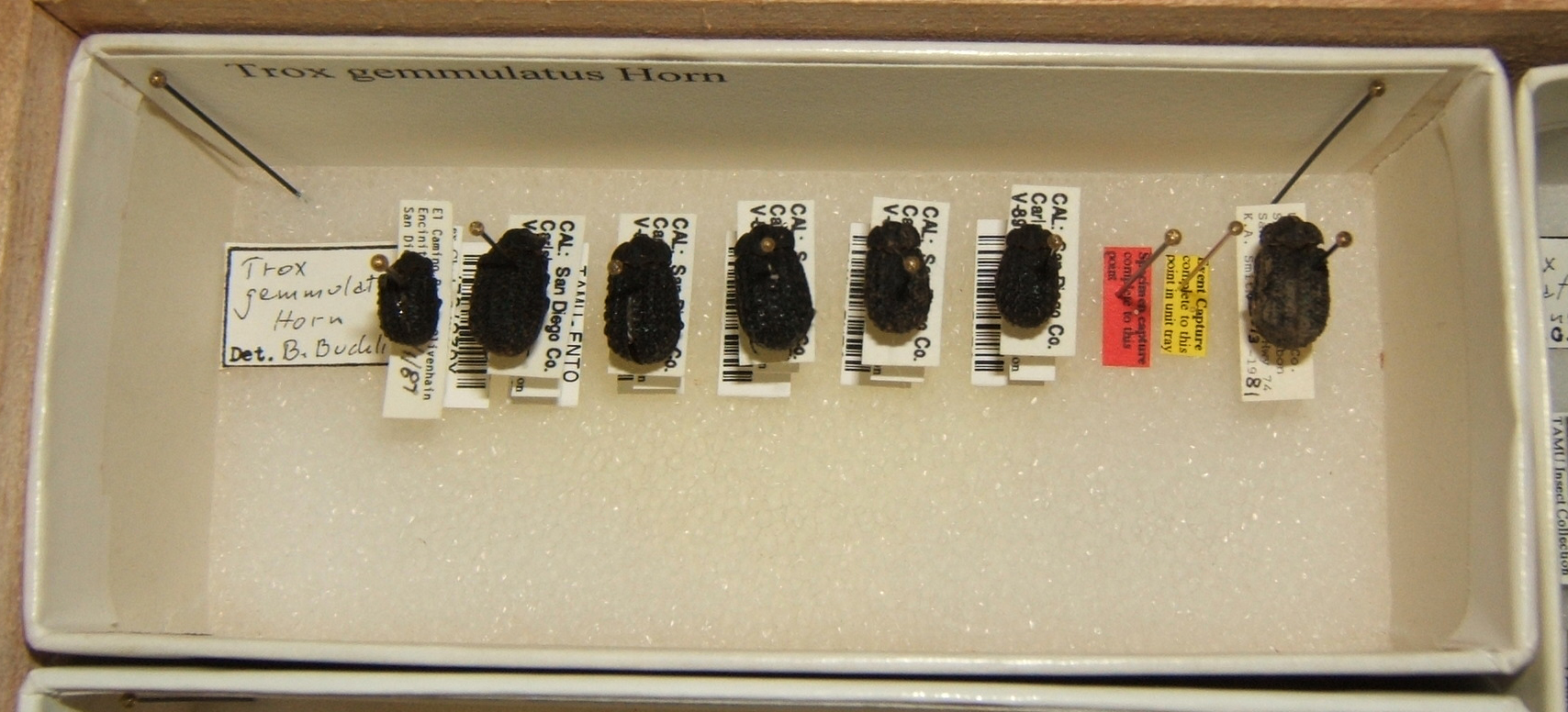
Trox gemmulatus variation

Media related to Trox gemmulatus at Wikimedia Commons
