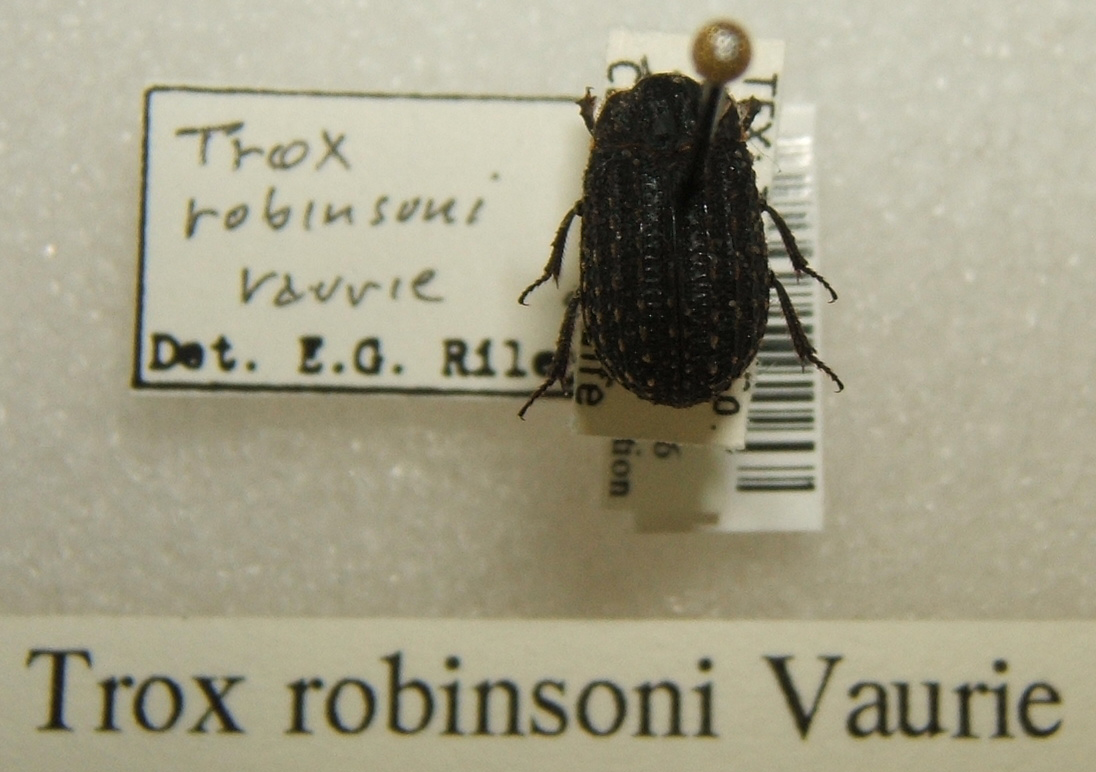
- Trox species, adult

Scientific classification
- Kingdom: Animalia
- Phylum: Arthropoda
- Clade: Pancrustacea
- Class: Insecta
- Order: Coleoptera
- Suborder: Polyphaga
- Infraorder: Scarabaeiformia
- Family: Trogidae
- Genus: Trox
- Species: T. robinsoni

Binomial name
- Trox robinsoni Vaurie, 1955

= Trox robinsoni =

Species of beetle

Trox robinsoni is a beetle of the family Trogidae.

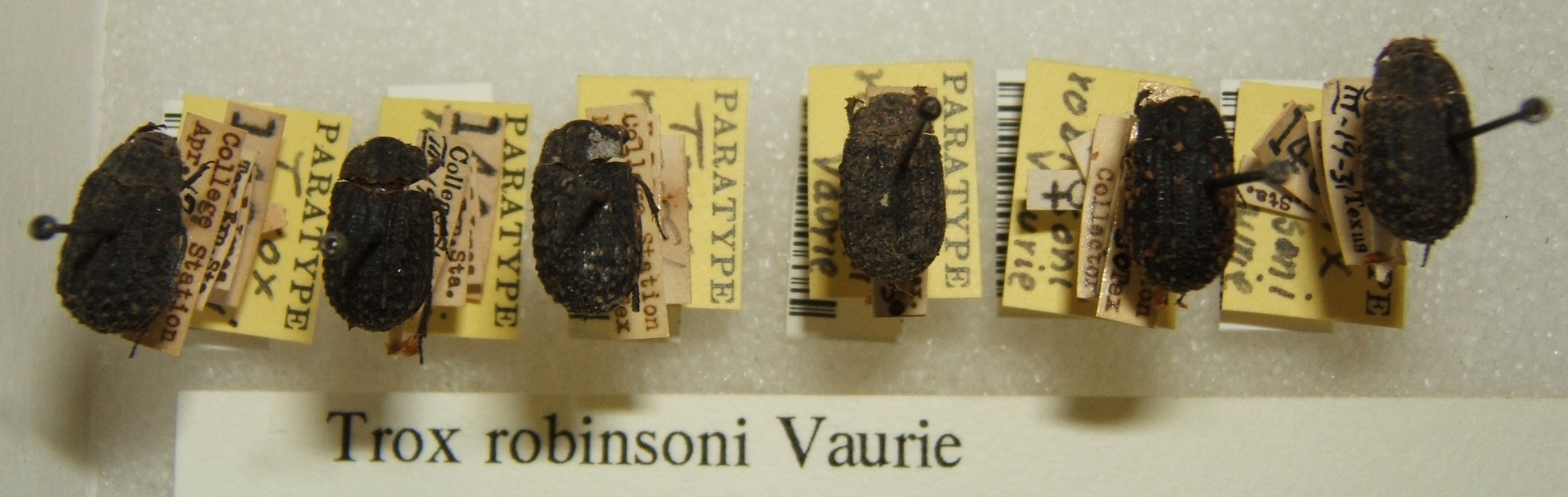
Trox robinsoni paratype

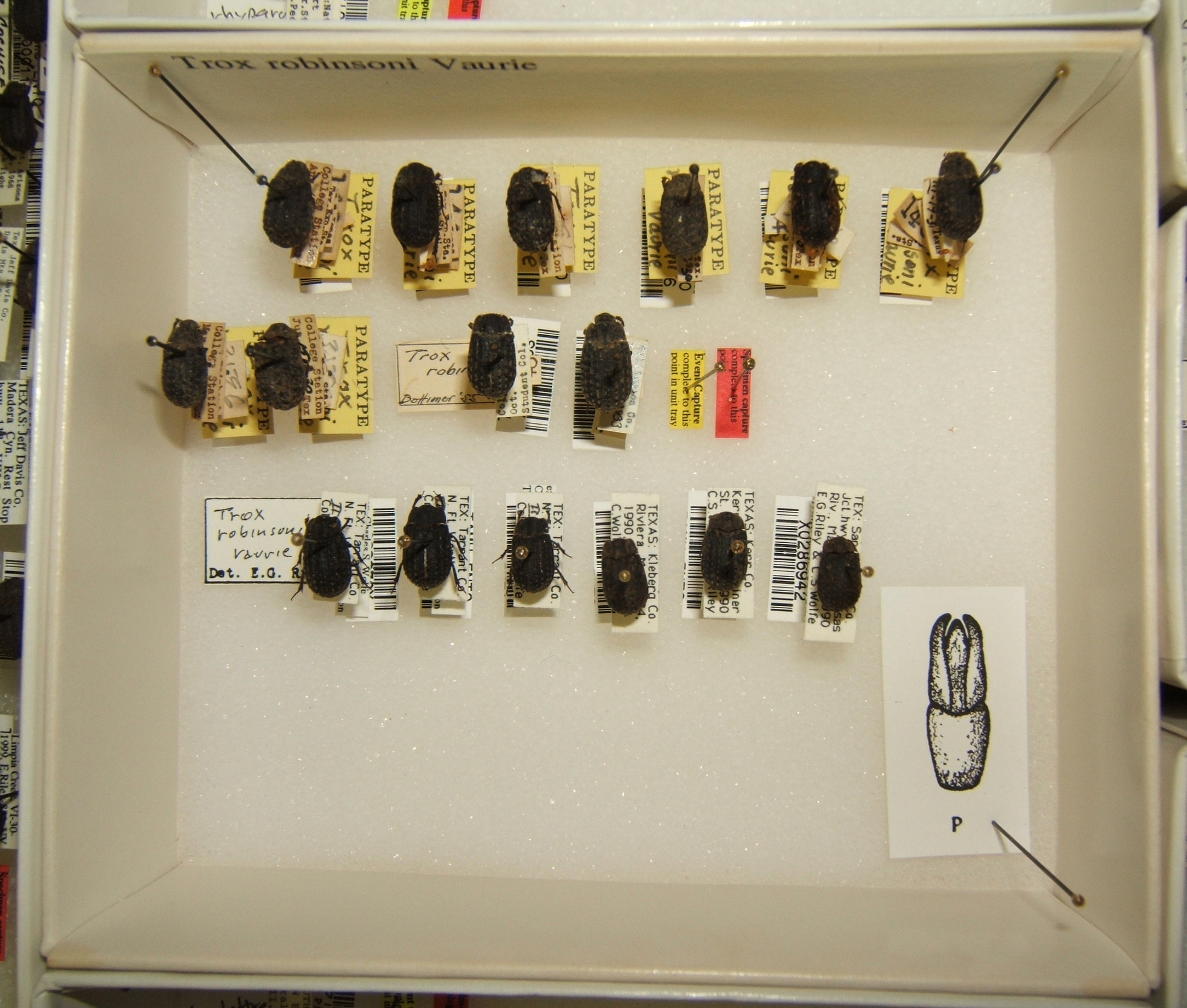
Trox robinsoni variation
