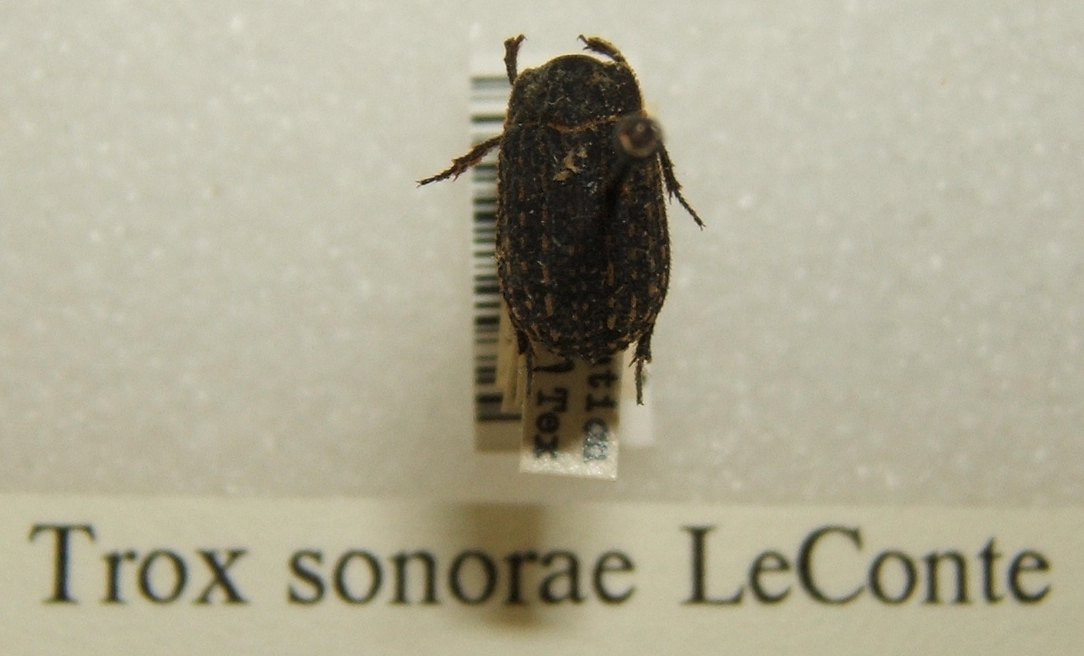
- Trox sonorae, adult

Scientific classification
- Kingdom: Animalia
- Phylum: Arthropoda
- Clade: Pancrustacea
- Class: Insecta
- Order: Coleoptera
- Suborder: Polyphaga
- Infraorder: Scarabaeiformia
- Family: Trogidae
- Genus: Trox
- Species: T. sonorae

Binomial name
- Trox sonorae LeConte, 1854

= Trox sonorae =

Species of beetle

Trox sonorae is a beetle of the family Trogidae. It was first scientifically described by Leconte in 1854.

This species is found in the Nearctic ecozone, inhabiting regions in Canada (Alberta, Northwest Territories, Saskatchewan), the United States (North Dakota, South Dakota, Missouri, Louisiana, Kansas, Texas, New Mexico, Nebraska), and China. Its length ranges from 8 to 11 millimeters, and it is typically found on carrion.

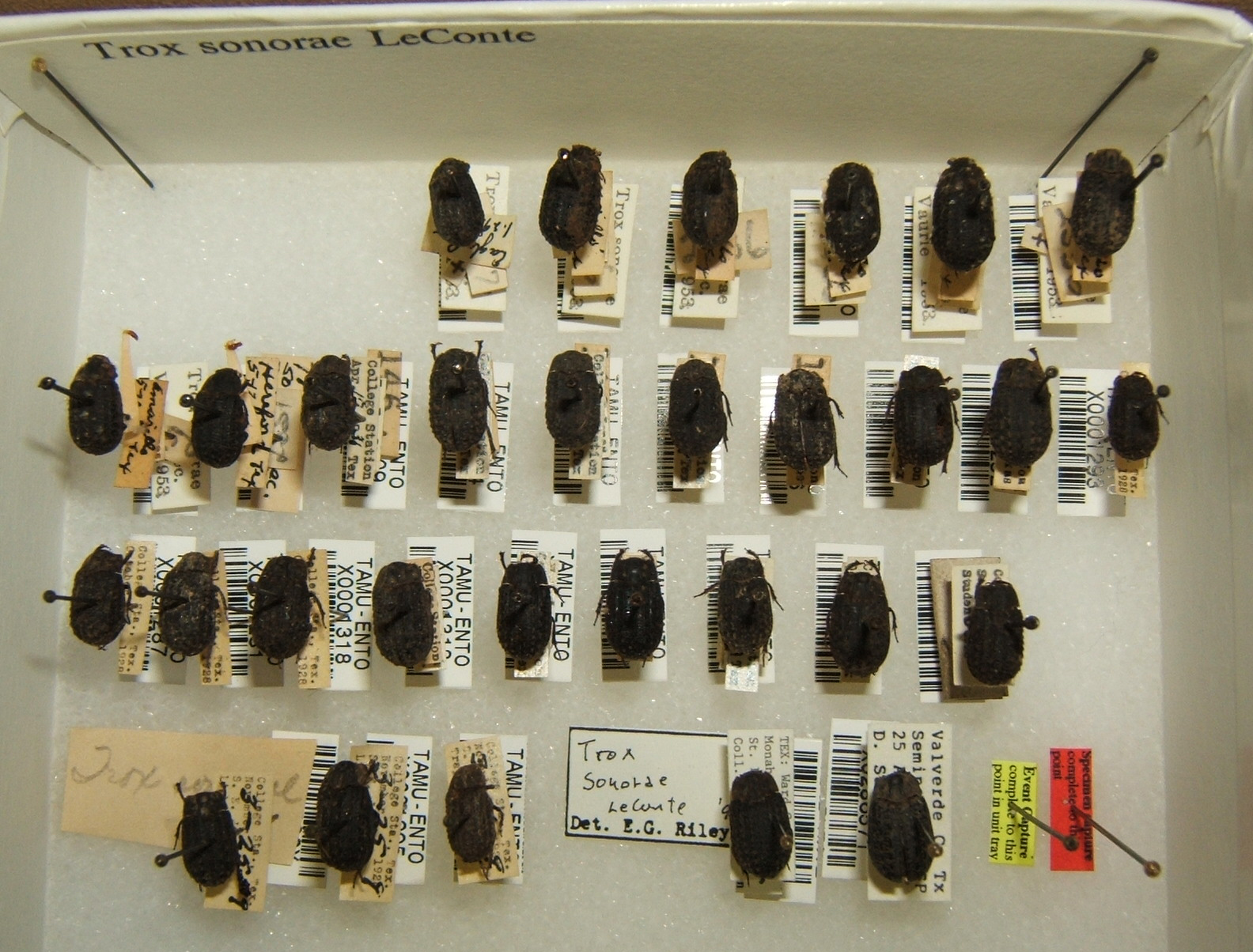
Trox sonorae variation
