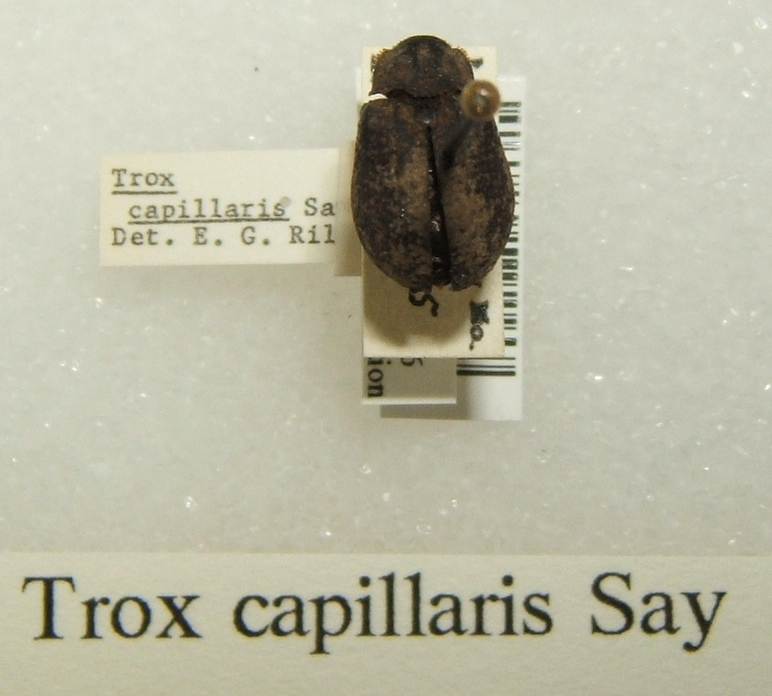
- Trox capillaris, adult

Scientific classification
- Kingdom: Animalia
- Phylum: Arthropoda
- Clade: Pancrustacea
- Class: Insecta
- Order: Coleoptera
- Suborder: Polyphaga
- Infraorder: Scarabaeiformia
- Family: Trogidae
- Genus: Trox
- Species: T. capillaris

Binomial name
- Trox capillaris Say, 1823

= Trox capillaris =

Species of beetle

Trox capillaris is a beetle of the family Trogidae.
