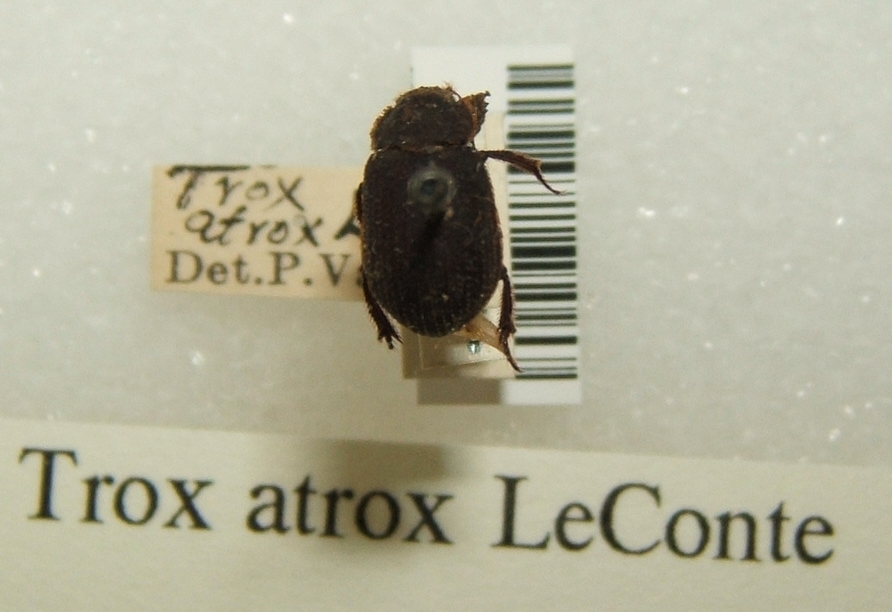
- Trox atrox, adult

Scientific classification
- Kingdom: Animalia
- Phylum: Arthropoda
- Clade: Pancrustacea
- Class: Insecta
- Order: Coleoptera
- Suborder: Polyphaga
- Infraorder: Scarabaeiformia
- Family: Trogidae
- Genus: Trox
- Species: T. atrox

Binomial name
- Trox atrox LeConte, 1854

= Trox atrox =

Species of beetle

Trox atrox is a beetle of the family Trogidae.

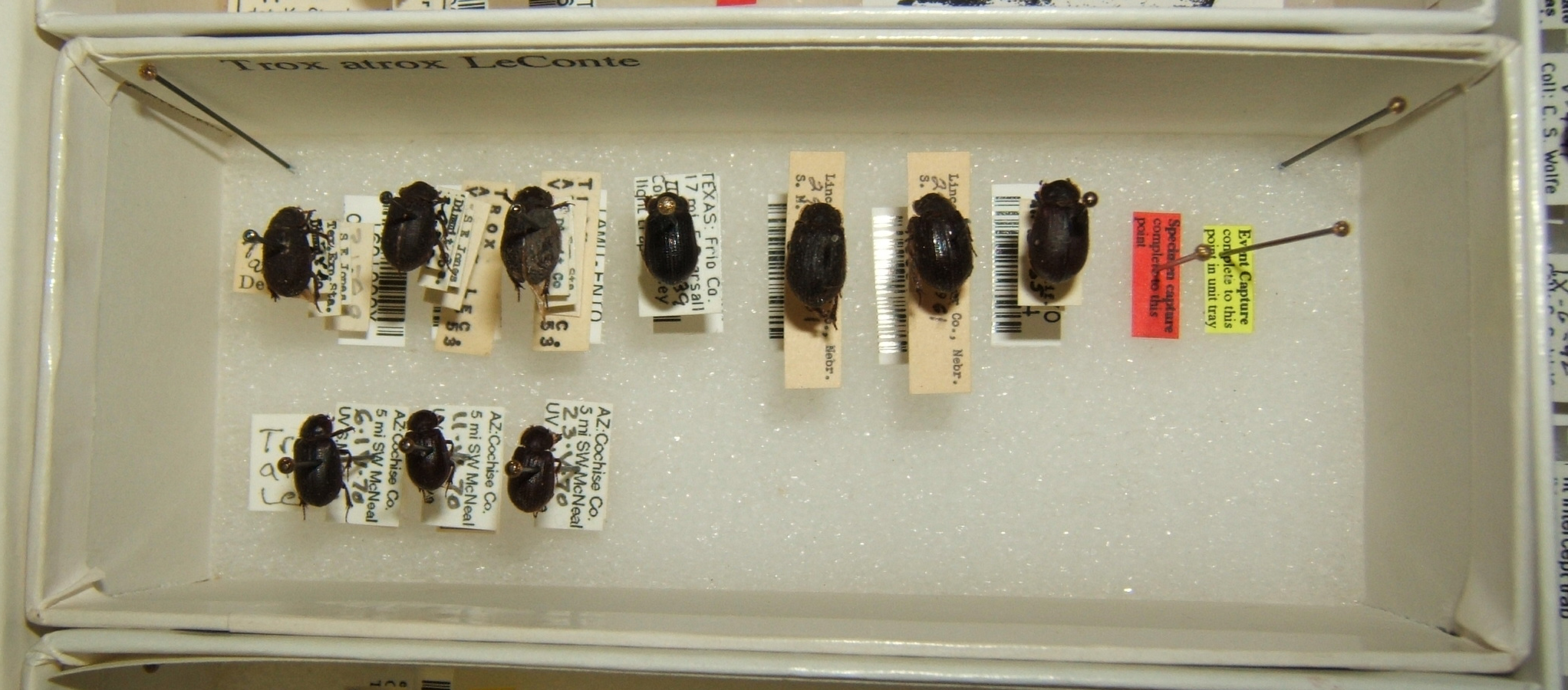
Trox atrox variation
