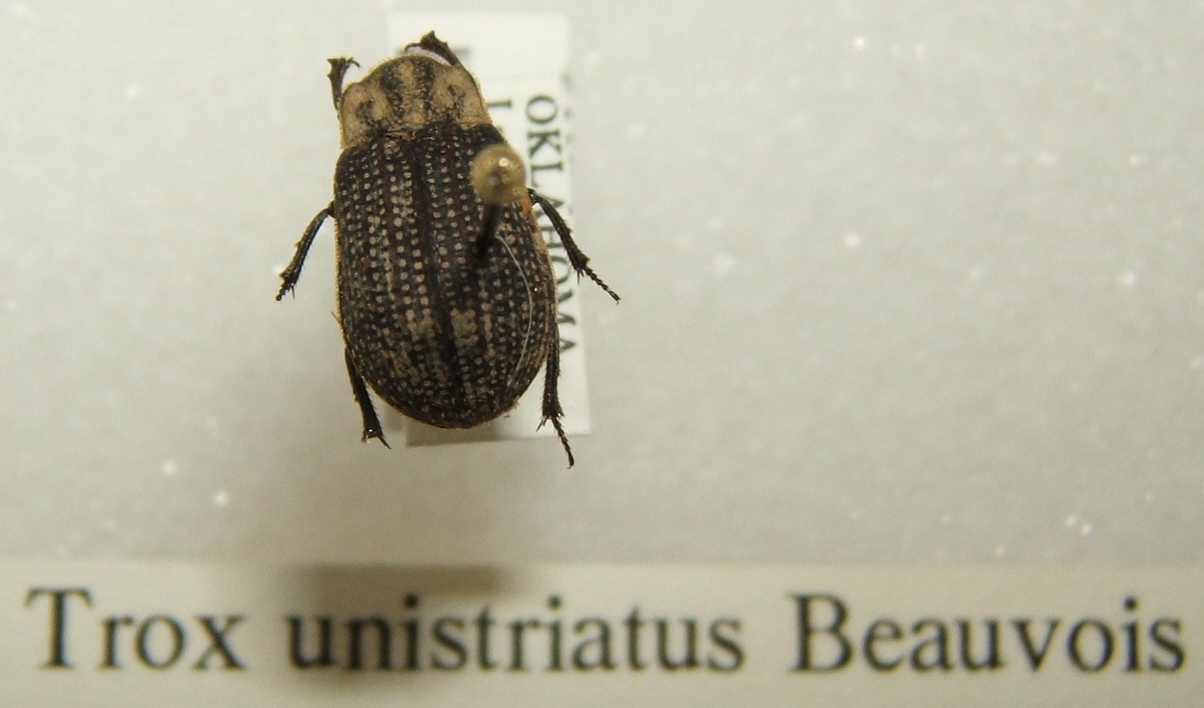
- Trox unistriatus, adult

Scientific classification
- Kingdom: Animalia
- Phylum: Arthropoda
- Clade: Pancrustacea
- Class: Insecta
- Order: Coleoptera
- Suborder: Polyphaga
- Infraorder: Scarabaeiformia
- Family: Trogidae
- Genus: Trox
- Species: T. unistriatus

Binomial name
- Trox unistriatus Palisot de Beauvois, 1818

= Trox unistriatus =

Species of beetle

Trox unistriatus is a beetle of the Family Trogidae.

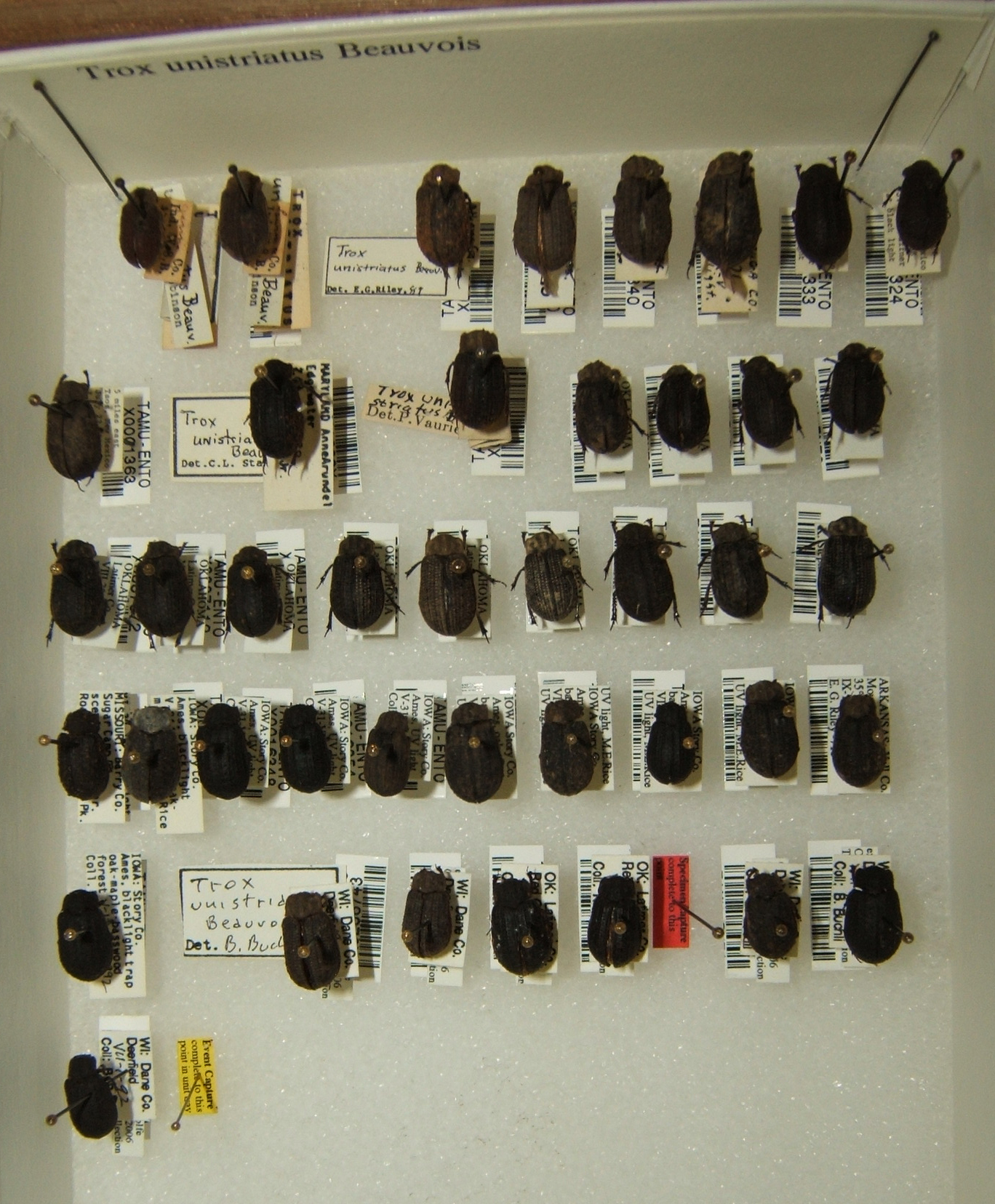
Trox unistriatus variation
