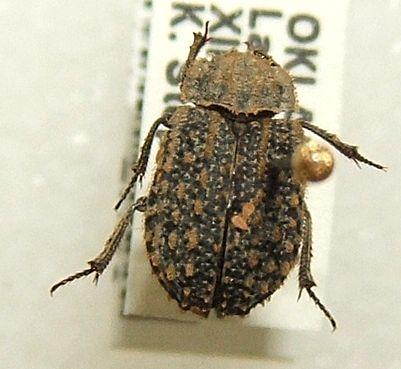
- Trox variolatus

Scientific classification
- Kingdom: Animalia
- Phylum: Arthropoda
- Clade: Pancrustacea
- Class: Insecta
- Order: Coleoptera
- Suborder: Polyphaga
- Infraorder: Scarabaeiformia
- Family: Trogidae
- Subfamily: Troginae
- Genus: Trox; Fabricius, 1775

= Trox =

Trox Temporal range: Aptian–Recent

Genus of beetles

Trox is a genus of hide beetle in the subfamily Troginae.

== Taxonomy ==
The genus formerly included 160 species, but the subgenera Phoberus and Glyptotrox have been elevated as their own separate genera, while various Trox species have been merged or otherwise combined, giving a considerably smaller genus. The genus Trox now contains three subgenera - Trox (Trox), Trox (Niditrox), and Trox (Granulitrox) -, with the following species:

=== Subgenus Trox ===
- Trox acanthinus Harold, 1872
- †Trox antiquus Wickham, 1909
- Trox cadaverinus Illiger, 1802
- Trox capillaris Say, 1824
- Trox contractus Robinson, 1940
- Trox coracinus Gmelin, 1788
- †Trox cretaceus Nikolajev, 2007
- Trox floridanus Howden & Vaurie, 1957
- Trox gansuensis Ren, 2003
- Trox gemmulatus Horn, 1874
- Trox horiguchii Ochi & Kawahara, 2002
- Trox lama Pittino, 1985
- Trox lutosus (Marsham, 1802)
- Trox maurus Herbst, 1790
- †Trox minutus Nikolajev, 2008
- Trox mitis Balthasar, 1933
- †Trox oustaleti Scudder, 1879
- Trox placosalinus Ren, 2003
- Trox plicatus Robinson, 1940
- Trox robinsoni Vaurie, 1955
- Trox sabulosus (Linnaeus, 1758)
- Trox setifer Waterhouse, 1875
- †Trox sibericus Nikolajev, 2007
- Trox sonorae LeConte, 1854
- Trox sordidus LeConte, 1854
- Trox stellatus Harold, 1872
- Trox striatus Melsheimer, 1846
- Trox torpidus Harold, 1872
- Trox tuberculatus De Geer, 1774
- Trox unistriatus Palisot de Beauvois, 1818
- Trox ussuriensis Balthasar, 1931
- Trox variolatus Melsheimer, 1846

=== Subgenus Niditrox ===
- Trox aequalis Say, 1831
- Trox affinis Robinson, 1940
- Trox atrox LeConte, 1854
- Trox eversmanni Krynicky, 1832
- Trox fascifer LeConte, 1854
- Trox koreanus Kim, 1991
- Trox kyotensis Ochi & Kawahara, 2000
- Trox laticollis LeConte, 1854
- Trox nohirai Nakane, 1954
- Trox perrisii Fairmaire, 1868
- Trox scaber (Linnaeus, 1767)
- Trox zoufali Balthasar, 1931

=== Subgenus Granulitrox ===
- Trox aproximans Escalera, 1914
- Trox clathratus Reiche, 1861
- Trox confluens Wollaston, 1864
- Trox cotodognanensis Compte, 1986
- Trox cribrum Gené, 1836
- Trox cyrenaicus Pittino, 2011
- Trox elkantaraensis Pittino, 2011
- Trox eximius Faldermann, 1835
- Trox fabricii Reiche, 1853
- Trox granulipennis Fairmaire, 1852
- Trox hispanicus Harold, 1872
- Trox hispidus (Pontoppidan, 1763)
- Trox iranicus Petrovitz, 1980
- Trox klapperichi Pittino, 1983
- Trox leonardii Pittino, 1983
- Trox litoralis Pittino, 1991
- Trox martini Reitter, 1892
- Trox mixtus Harold, 1872
- Trox morticinii Pallas, 1781
- Trox niger Rossi, 1792
- Trox nodulosus Harold, 1872
- Trox perlatus Geoffroy, 1762
- Trox quadrimaculatus Ballion, 1870
- Trox sordidatus Balthasar, 1936
- Trox strandi Balthasar, 1936
- Trox transversus Reiche, 1856

=== Incertae sedis ===
- Trox cricetulus Ádám, 1994
