= Troginae =

Scientific classification
- Domain: Eukaryota
- Kingdom: Animalia
- Phylum: Arthropoda
- Class: Insecta
- Order: Coleoptera
- Suborder: Polyphaga
- Infraorder: Scarabaeiformia
- Family: Trogidae
- Subfamily: Troginae; MacLeay, 1819

Subfamily of beetles

Troginae is a subfamily of beetles in the family Trogidae which includes extant species and extinct beetle species from the Lower Cretaceous. The subfamily contains the following genera:

- Glyptotrox Nikolajev, 2016
- †Paratrox Nikolajev, 2009
- Phoberus MacLeay, 1819
- Trox Fabricius, 1775
