= List of Prodidominae species =

This page lists all described genera and species of the spider family Prodidominae. As of August 2022, the World Spider Catalog accepts 192 species in 23 genera:

== Austrodomus ==
Austrodomus Simon,1884

- Austrodomus gamsberg Rodrigues & Rheims, 2020 – South Africa
- Austrodomus oxoniensis (Cooke, 1964) – South Africa
- Austrodomus scaber (Purcell, 1904) – South Africa
- Austrodomus zuluensis Lawrence, 1947 – South Africa

== Brasilomma ==
Brasilomma Brescovit, Ferreira & Rheims, 2012

- Brasilomma enigmatica Brescovit, Ferreira & Rheims, 2012 – Brazil

== Caudalia ==
Caudalia Alayón, 1980

- Caudalia insularis Alayón, 1980 – Greater Antilles

== Chileomma ==
Chileomma Platnick, Shadab & Sorkin, 2005

- Chileomma campana Platnick, Shadab & Sorkin, 2005 – Chile
- Chileomma chilensis Platnick, Shadab & Sorkin, 2005 – Chile
- Chileomma franckei Platnick, Shadab & Sorkin, 2005 – Chile
- Chileomma malleco Platnick, Shadab & Sorkin, 2005 – Chile
- Chileomma petorca Platnick, Shadab & Sorkin, 2005 – Chile
- Chileomma rinconada Platnick, Shadab & Sorkin, 2005 – Chile
- Chileomma ruiles Platnick, Shadab & Sorkin, 2005 – Chile

== Chileuma ==
Chileuma Platnick, Shadab & Sorkin, 2005

- Chileuma paposo Platnick, Shadab & Sorkin, 2005 – Chile
- Chileuma renca Platnick, Shadab & Sorkin, 2005 – Chile
- Chileuma serena Platnick, Shadab & Sorkin, 2005 – Chile

== Chilongius ==
Chilongius Platnick, Shadab & Sorkin, 2005

- Chilongius eltofo Platnick, Shadab & Sorkin, 2005 – Chile
- Chilongius frayjorge Platnick, Shadab & Sorkin, 2005 – Chile
- Chilongius huasco Platnick, Shadab & Sorkin, 2005 – Chile
- Chilongius molles Platnick, Shadab & Sorkin, 2005 – Chile
- Chilongius palmas Platnick, Shadab & Sorkin, 2005 – Chile

== Eleleis ==
Eleleis Simon, 1893

- Eleleis crinita Simon, 1893 – South Africa
- Eleleis etosha Rodrigues & Rheims, 2020 – Namibia
- Eleleis haddadi Rodrigues & Rheims, 2020 – South Africa
- Eleleis himba Rodrigues & Rheims, 2020 – Namibia
- Eleleis leleupi Rodrigues & Rheims, 2020 – South Africa
- Eleleis limpopo Rodrigues & Rheims, 2020 – Zambia, South Africa
- Eleleis luderitz Rodrigues & Rheims, 2020 – Namibia
- Eleleis okavango Rodrigues & Rheims, 2020 – Namibia, Botswana
- Eleleis solitaria Rodrigues & Rheims, 2020 – Cape Verde

== Indiani ==
Indiani Rodrigues, Cizauskas & Lemos, 2020

- Indiani gaspar Rodrigues, Cizauskas & Lemos, 2020 – Brazil

== Lygromma ==
Lygromma Simon, 1893

- Lygromma anops Peck & Shear, 1987 – Galapagos Islands
- Lygromma chamberlini Gertsch, 1941 – Panama, Colombia, Cuba
- Lygromma domingo Platnick & Shadab, 1981 – Ecuador
- Lygromma dybasi Platnick & Shadab, 1981 – Costa Rica, Panama
- Lygromma gasnieri Brescovit & Höfer, 1993 – Brazil
- Lygromma gertschi Platnick & Shadab, 1981 – Jamaica
- Lygromma huberti Platnick & Shadab, 1981 – Venezuela, Brazil
- Lygromma kochalkai Platnick & Shadab, 1981 – Colombia
- Lygromma nicolae Víquez, 2020 – Costa Rica
- Lygromma peckorum Platnick & Shadab, 1981 – Colombia
- Lygromma peruvianum Platnick & Shadab, 1981 – Peru
- Lygromma quindio Platnick & Shadab, 1981 – Colombia
- Lygromma senoculatum Simon, 1893 – Venezuela
- Lygromma simoni (Berland, 1913) – Ecuador
- Lygromma taruma Brescovit & Bonaldo, 1998 – Brazil
- Lygromma tuxtla Platnick, 1978 – Mexico
- Lygromma valencianum Simon, 1893 – Venezuela
- Lygromma volcan Platnick & Shadab, 1981 – Panama
- Lygromma wygodzinskyi Platnick, 1978 – Colombia

== Lygrommatoides ==
Lygrommatoides Strand, 1918

- Lygrommatoides problematica Strand, 1918 – Japan

== Moreno ==
Moreno Mello-Leitão, 1940

- Moreno chacabuco Platnick, Shadab & Sorkin, 2005 – Chile
- Moreno chivato Platnick, Shadab & Sorkin, 2005 – Chile
- Moreno grande Platnick, Shadab & Sorkin, 2005 – Chile
- Moreno morenoi Mello-Leitão, 1940 – Argentina
- Moreno neuquen Platnick, Shadab & Sorkin, 2005 – Argentina
- Moreno neuquen Platnick, Shadab & Sorkin, 2005 – Argentina

== Namundra ==
Namundra Platnick & Bird, 2007

- Namundra brandberg Platnick & Bird, 2007 – Namibia
- Namundra griffinae Platnick & Bird, 2007 – Namibia
- Namundra kleynjansi Platnick & Bird, 2007 – Namibia
- Namundra leechi Platnick & Bird, 2007 – Angola
- Namundra murphyi Haddad, 2022 – South Africa

== Neozimiris ==
Neozimiris Simon, 1903

- Neozimiris chickeringi Platnick & Shadab, 1976 – Panama
- Neozimiris crinis Platnick & Shadab, 1976 – Mexico
- Neozimiris escandoni Müller, 1987 – Colombia
- Neozimiris exuma Platnick & Shadab, 1976 – Bahama Is.
- Neozimiris levii Platnick & Shadab, 1976 – Curaçao
- Neozimiris nuda Platnick & Shadab, 1976 – Puerto Rico
- Neozimiris pinta Platnick & Shadab, 1976 – Ecuador (Galapagos Is.)
- Neozimiris pinzon Platnick & Shadab, 1976 – Ecuador (Galapagos Is.)
- Neozimiris pubescens (Banks, 1898) – USA, Mexico

== Nopyllus ==
Nopyllus Ott, 2014

- Nopyllus isabelae (Brescovit & Lise, 1993) – Brazil
- Nopyllus vicente Ott, 2014 – Brazil

== Paracymbiomma ==
Paracymbiomma Rodrigues, Cizauskas & Rheims, 2018

- Paracymbiomma angelim Rodrigues, Cizauskas & Rheims, 2018 – Brazil
- Paracymbiomma bocaina Rodrigues, Cizauskas & Rheims, 2018 – Brazil
- Paracymbiomma caecus Rodrigues, Cizauskas & Rheims, 2018 – Brazil
- Paracymbiomma carajas Rodrigues, Cizauskas & Rheims, 2018 – Brazil
- Paracymbiomma doisirmaos Rodrigues, Cizauskas & Rheims, 2018 – Brazil
- Paracymbiomma pauferrense Rodrigues, Cizauskas & Rheims, 2018 – Brazil

== Plutonodomus ==
Plutonodomus Cooke, 1964

- Plutonodomus kungwensis Cooke, 1964 – Tanzania

== Prodidomus ==
Prodidomus Hentz, 1847

- Prodidomus amaranthinus (Lucas, 1846) – Mediterranean
- Prodidomus aurantiacus Simon, 1890 – Yemen
- Prodidomus beattyi Platnick, 1977 – Australia
- Prodidomus bendee Platnick & Baehr, 2006 – Australia
- Prodidomus bicolor Denis, 1957 – Sudan
- Prodidomus birmanicus Thorell, 1897 – Myanmar
- Prodidomus bryantae Alayón, 1995 – Cuba
- Prodidomus capensis Purcell, 1904 – South Africa
- Prodidomus chaperi (Simon, 1884) – India
- Prodidomus clarki Cooke, 1964 – Ascension Island
- Prodidomus dalmasi Berland, 1920 – Kenya
- Prodidomus djibutensis Dalmas, 1919 – Somalia
- Prodidomus domesticus Lessert, 1938 – Congo
- Prodidomus duffeyi Cooke, 1964 – Ascension Island
- Prodidomus flavidus (Simon, 1884) – Algeria
- Prodidomus flavipes Lawrence, 1952 – South Africa
- Prodidomus flavus Platnick & Baehr, 2006 – Australia
- Prodidomus geniculosus Dalmas, 1919 – Tunisia
- Prodidomus granulosus Cooke, 1964 – Rwanda
- Prodidomus hispanicus Dalmas, 1919 – Spain, Greece
- Prodidomus inexpectatus Zamani, Chatzaki, Esyunin & Marusik, 2021 – Iran
- Prodidomus kimberley Platnick & Baehr, 2006 – Australia
- Prodidomus lampeli Cooke, 1964 – Ethiopia
- Prodidomus latebricola Cooke, 1964 – Tanzania
- Prodidomus longiventris (Dalmas, 1919) – Philippines
- Prodidomus margala Platnick, 1976 – Pakistan
- Prodidomus maximus Lessert, 1936 – Mozambique
- Prodidomus nigellus Simon, 1890 – Yemen
- Prodidomus nigricaudus Simon, 1893 – Venezuela
- Prodidomus opacithorax Simon, 1893 – Venezuela
- Prodidomus palkai Cooke, 1972 – India
- Prodidomus papavanasanemensis Cooke, 1972 – India
- Prodidomus purpurascens Purcell, 1904 – South Africa
- Prodidomus purpureus Simon, 1907 – West Africa
- Prodidomus redikorzevi Spassky, 1940 – Turkey, Azerbaijan, Iraq, Iran, Kazakhstan, Turkmenistan
- Prodidomus reticulatus Lawrence, 1927 – Namibia
- Prodidomus revocatus Cooke, 1964 – Mauritius
- Prodidomus robustus Dalmas, 1919 – Ethiopia
- Prodidomus rodolphianus Dalmas, 1919 – East Africa
- Prodidomus rollasoni Cooke, 1964 – Libya
- Prodidomus rufus Hentz, 1847 – Israel, China, Japan, New Caledonia, USA, Cuba, Argentina, Chile, St. Helena
- Prodidomus saharanpurensis (Tikader, 1982) – India
- Prodidomus sampeyae Platnick & Baehr, 2006 – Australia
- Prodidomus seemani Platnick & Baehr, 2006 – Australia
- Prodidomus simoni Dalmas, 1919 – South Africa
- Prodidomus singulus Suman, 1967 – Hawaii
- Prodidomus sirohi Platnick, 1976 – India
- Prodidomus stella (Saaristo, 2002) – Seychelles
- Prodidomus tigrinus Dalmas, 1919 – West Africa
- Prodidomus tirumalai Cooke, 1972 – India
- Prodidomus venkateswarai Cooke, 1972 – India
- Prodidomus watongwensis Cooke, 1964 – Tanzania
- Prodidomus woodleigh Platnick & Baehr, 2006 – Australia
- Prodidomus wunderlichi Deeleman-Reinhold, 2001 – Thailand
- Prodidomus yorke Platnick & Baehr, 2006 – Australia

== Purcelliana ==
Purcelliana Cooke, 1964

- Purcelliana cederbergensis Rodrigues & Rheims, 2020 – South Africa
- Purcelliana kamaseb Rodrigues & Rheims, 2020 – Namibia
- Purcelliana khabus Rodrigues & Rheims, 2020 – Namibia
- Purcelliana problematica Cooke, 1964 – South Africa

== Theuma ==
Theuma Simon, 1893

- Theuma ababensis Tucker, 1923 – South Africa
- Theuma andonea Lawrence, 1927 – Namibia
- Theuma aprica Simon, 1893 – South Africa
- Theuma capensis Purcell, 1907 – Botswana, South Africa
- Theuma cedri Purcell, 1907 – South Africa
- Theuma elucubata Tucker, 1923 – South Africa
- Theuma foveolata Tucker, 1923 – South Africa
- Theuma funerea Lawrence, 1928 – Namibia
- Theuma fusca Purcell, 1907 – Namibia, South Africa
- Theuma longipes Lawrence, 1927 – Namibia
- Theuma maculata Purcell, 1907 – South Africa
- Theuma microphthalma Lawrence, 1928 – Namibia
- Theuma mutica Purcell, 1907 – South Africa
- Theuma ovambica Lawrence, 1927 – Namibia
- Theuma parva Purcell, 1907 – South Africa
- Theuma purcelli Tucker, 1923 – South Africa
- Theuma pusilla Purcell, 1908 – Namibia, South Africa
- Theuma recta Lawrence, 1927 – Namibia
- Theuma schreineri Purcell, 1907 – South Africa
- Theuma schultzei Purcell, 1908 – Namibia, South Africa
- Theuma tragardhi Lawrence, 1947 – South Africa
- Theuma velox Purcell, 1908 – Namibia
- Theuma walteri (Simon, 1889) – Turkmenistan
- Theuma xylina Simon, 1893 – South Africa
- Theuma zuluensis Lawrence, 1947 – South Africa

== Tivodrassus ==
Tivodrassus Chamberlin & Ivie, 1936

- Tivodrassus ethophor Chamberlin & Ivie, 1936 – Mexico
- Tivodrassus farias Platnick & Shadab, 1976 – Mexico
- Tivodrassus pecki Platnick & Shadab, 1976 – Mexico
- Tivodrassus reddelli Platnick & Shadab, 1976 – Mexico

== Tricongius ==
Tricongius Simon, 1893

- Tricongius amazonicus Platnick & Höfer, 1990 – Brazil
- Tricongius beltraoae (Brescovit & Ramos, 2003) – Brazil
- Tricongius collinus Simon, 1893 – Venezuela
- Tricongius granadensis Mello-Leitão, 1941 – Colombia
- Tricongius mutilatus (Mello-Leitão, 1940) – Argentina
- Tricongius ribaslangei (Bonaldo & Brescovit, 1997) – Brazil
- Tricongius ybyguara (Rheims & Brescovit, 2004) – Brazil

== Zimirina ==
Zimirina Dalmas, 1919

- Zimirina brevipes Pérez & Blasco, 1986 – Spain, Italy (Sardinia)
- Zimirina cineris Cooke, 1964 – Canary Is.
- Zimirina deserticola Dalmas, 1919 – Algeria
- Zimirina gomerae (Schmidt, 1981) – Canary Is.
- Zimirina grancanariensis Wunderlich, 1992 – Canary Is.
- Zimirina hirsuta Cooke, 1964 – Canary Is.
- Zimirina lepida (Blackwall, 1859) – Madeira
- Zimirina moyaensis Wunderlich, 1992 – Canary Is.
- Zimirina nabavii Wunderlich, 2011 – Canary Is.
- Zimirina penicillata (Simon, 1893) (type) – Algeria
- Zimirina relegata Cooke, 1977 – St. Helena
- Zimirina spinicymbia Wunderlich, 1992 – Canary Is.
- Zimirina tenuidens Denis, 1956 – Morocco
- Zimirina transvaalica Dalmas, 1919 – South Africa
- Zimirina vastitatis Cooke, 1964 – Libya, Egypt

== Zimiris ==
Zimiris Simon, 1882

- Zimiris diffusa Platnick & Penney, 2004 – Yemen, India, St. Helena
- Zimiris doriae Simon, 1882
