= Austrodomus =

Scientific classification
- Kingdom: Animalia
- Phylum: Arthropoda
- Subphylum: Chelicerata
- Class: Arachnida
- Order: Araneae
- Infraorder: Araneomorphae
- Family: Prodidomidae
- Genus: Austrodomus; Lawrence, 1947

Type species
- A. zuluensis Lawrence, 1947

Species
- A. scaber (Purcell, 1904) – South Africa; A. zuluensis Lawrence, 1947 – South Africa

Genus of spiders

Austrodomus is a genus of long-spinneret ground spider that was first described by R. F. Lawrence in 1947. They are found is southern Africa.

== Description ==
Spiders in the genus Austrodomus have a total length 1.66–2.50 mm for males and 2.04–5.34 mm for females. The carapace and legs are yellow, and the opisthosoma is grayish. The carapace is longer than wide, oval, and fairly flat, without thoracic stria. The clypeus is narrowed.

The genus has eight eyes with the posterior eye row strongly procurved and the anterior eye row approximately straight. The chelicerae are large without boss and generally projected antero-ventrally. The sternum is longer than wide with an anterior margin that is rounded and rebordered anteriorly and laterally. The posterior region strongly protrudes between coxae IV with numerous long and erect setae. The opisthosoma is oval and longer than wide, without scales. The dorsum of the abdomen lacks curved setae anteriorly.

There are six spinnerets, with anterior lateral spinnerets as long as wide and contiguous. The legs are fairly long and slender with a formula of 4123. Legs III and IV have spines on the femora, tibiae, and metatarsi. There are two smooth claws and dense claw tufts of tenent setae inserted in a well-delimited plate. The tarsus has modified apical ventral setae, and a solid claw tuft clasper is present.

== Species ==
As of September 2025 the genus contains four species:

- Austrodomus gamsberg Rodrigues & Rheims, 2020 - Namibia
- Austrodomus oxoniensis (Cooke, 1964) - Tanzania
- Austrodomus scaber (Purcell, 1904) - Namibia, South Africa
- Austrodomus zuluensis Lawrence, 1947 - Mozambique, South Africa

== Taxonomy ==
The genus was transferred from Prodidomidae to Gnaphosidae (Prodidominae) by Azevedo, Griswold & Santos (2018), and back to the restored Prodidomidae by Azevedo et al., 2022.
