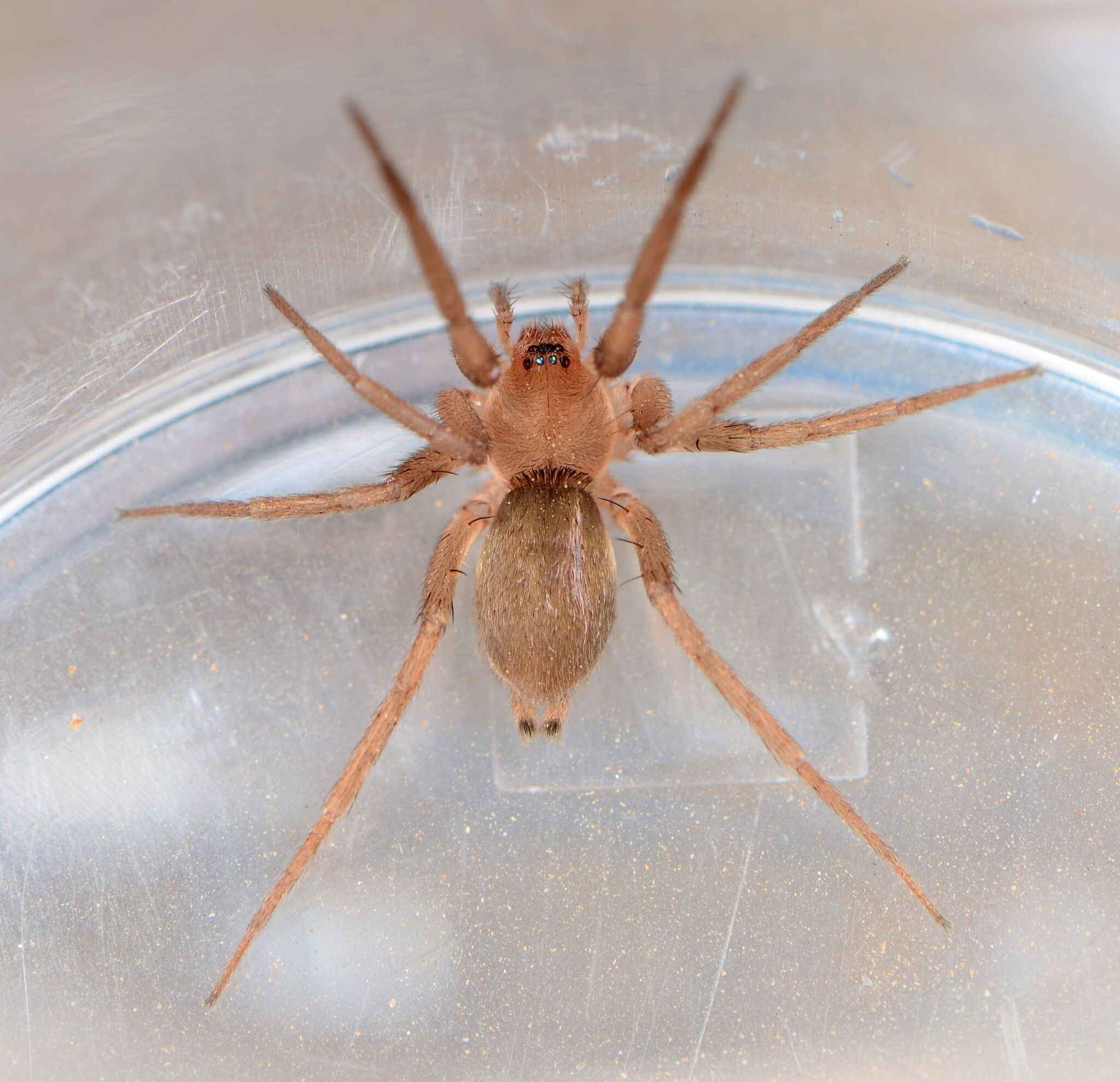
- Female

Scientific classification
- Kingdom: Animalia
- Phylum: Arthropoda
- Subphylum: Chelicerata
- Class: Arachnida
- Order: Araneae
- Infraorder: Araneomorphae
- Family: Prodidomidae
- Genus: Theuma
- Species: T. capensis

Binomial name
- Theuma capensis Purcell, 1907

= Theuma capensis =

Cape Theuma Long Spinnered Ground Spider

Species of spider

Theuma capensis is a species of spider in the family Prodidomidae. It is a southern African endemic commonly known as the Cape Theuma long spinnered ground spider.

== Distribution ==
Theuma capensis occurs in Botswana and South Africa.

In South Africa, it is recorded from Free State, KwaZulu-Natal, Northern Cape, and Western Cape, with notable locations including Erfenis Dam Nature Reserve, Tembe Elephant Park, Namaqua National Park, Anysberg Nature Reserve, De Hoop Nature Reserve, Cederberg Wilderness Area, Bontebok National Park, and Robben Island.

== Habitat and ecology ==
Theuma capensis is a free-running ground dweller found in multiple biomes including Fynbos, Grassland, Nama Karoo, and Savanna biomes at altitudes ranging from 63 to 1,523 m above sea level.

== Conservation ==
Theuma capensis is listed as Least Concern by the South African National Biodiversity Institute due to its wide geographical range. There are no significant threats to the species, and it is protected in more than ten protected areas.

== Taxonomy ==
The species was originally described by William Frederick Purcell in 1907 from Camps Bay in the Western Cape. It has not been revised but is known from both sexes.
