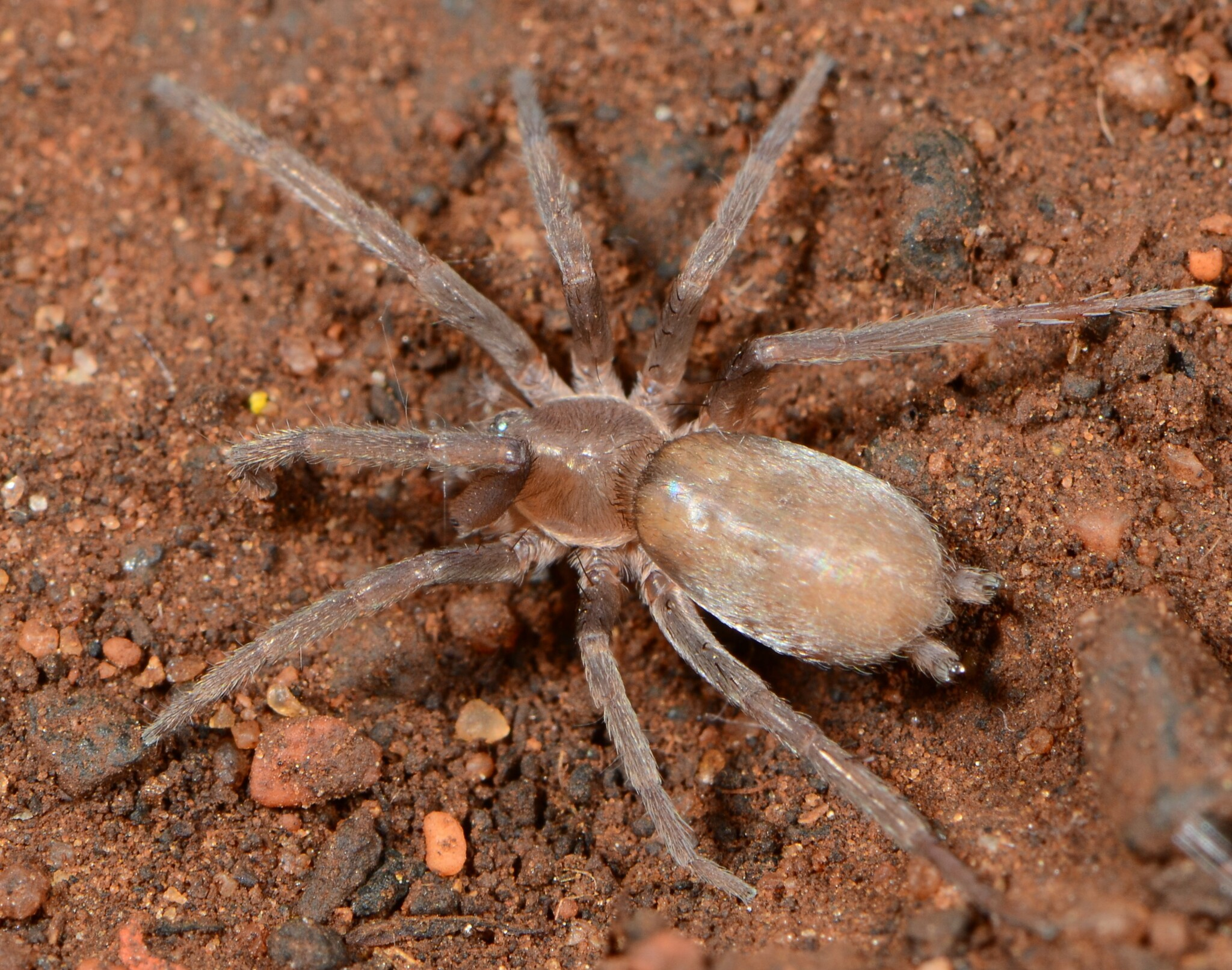
- Female T. fusca
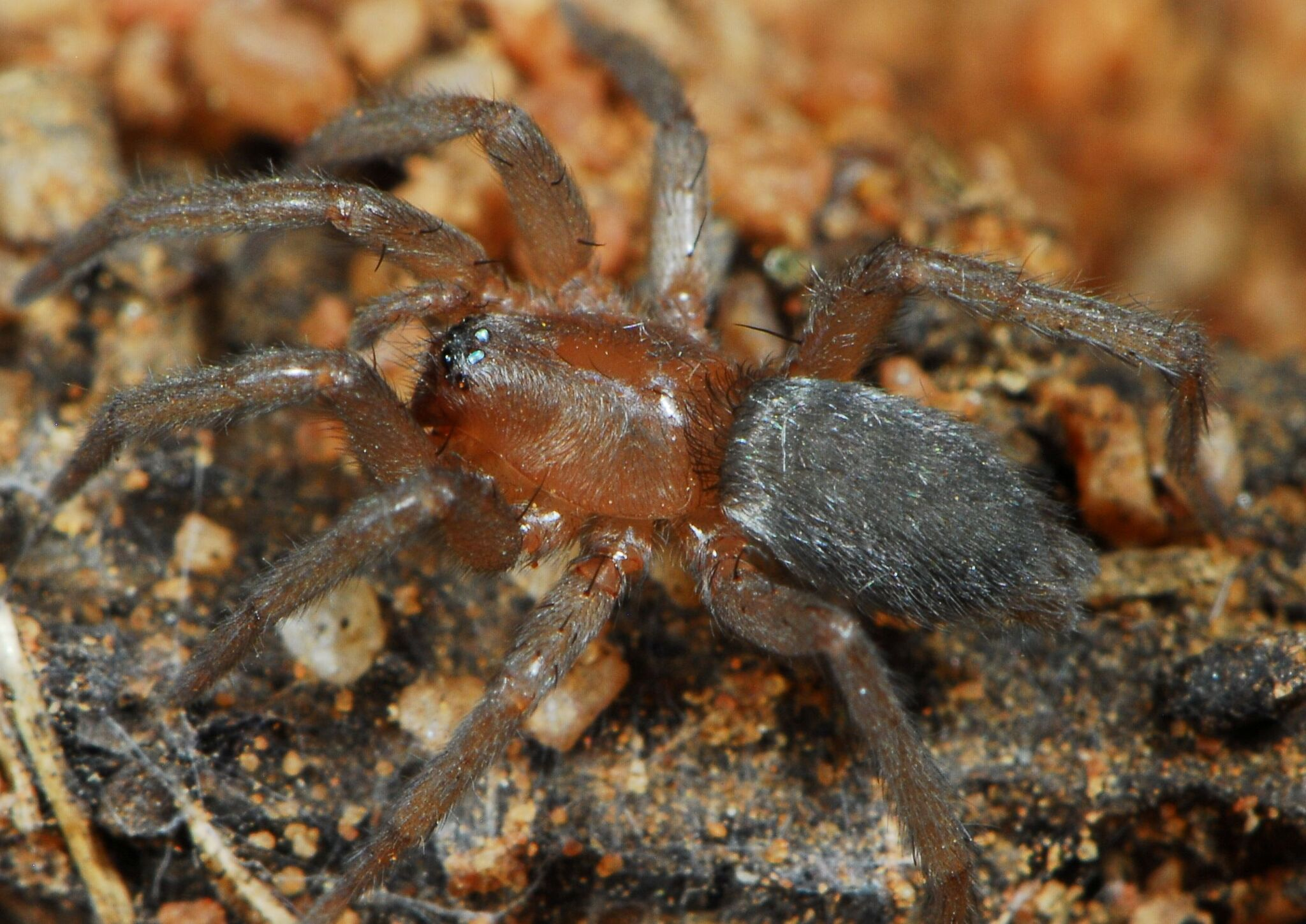
- male T. foveolata

Scientific classification
- Kingdom: Animalia
- Phylum: Arthropoda
- Subphylum: Chelicerata
- Class: Arachnida
- Order: Araneae
- Infraorder: Araneomorphae
- Family: Prodidomidae
- Genus: Theuma; Simon, 1893

Type species
- T. walteri (Simon, 1889)

Species
- 25, see text

= Theuma (spider) =

Genus of spiders

Theuma is a genus of African long-spinneret ground spiders that was first described by Eugène Louis Simon in 1893. It was transferred to the ground spiders in 2018, then returned in 2022.

== Distribution ==
Although Theuma walteri was described from Turkmenistan by Eugène Simon, it is suspected that Simon accidentally exchanged its locality with that of Anagraphis pallens (Gnaphosidae); then T. walteri would have been collected in the Cape of Good Hope, while A. pallens is from Turkmenistan.

== Description ==
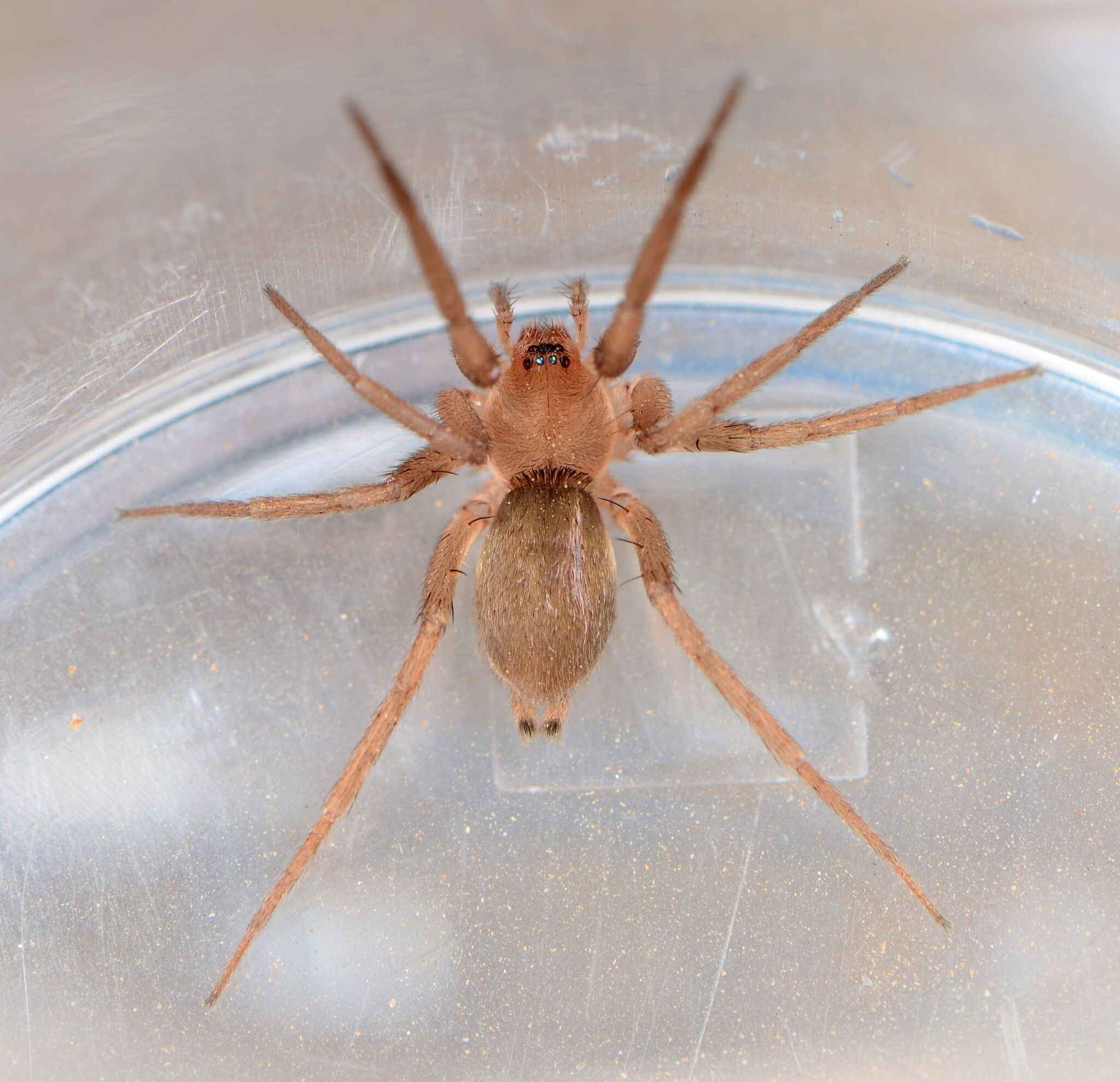
female T. capensis

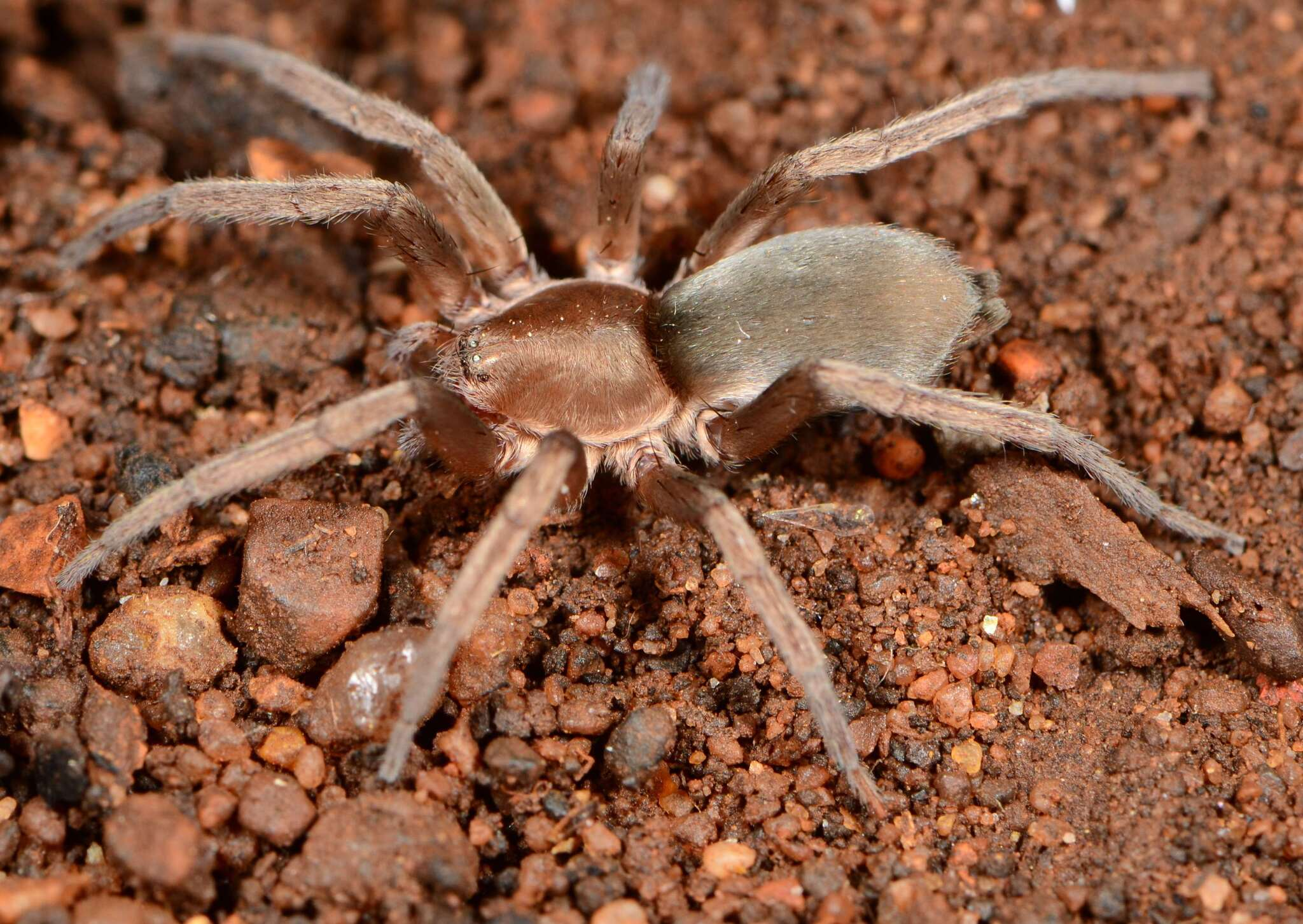
female T. cedri

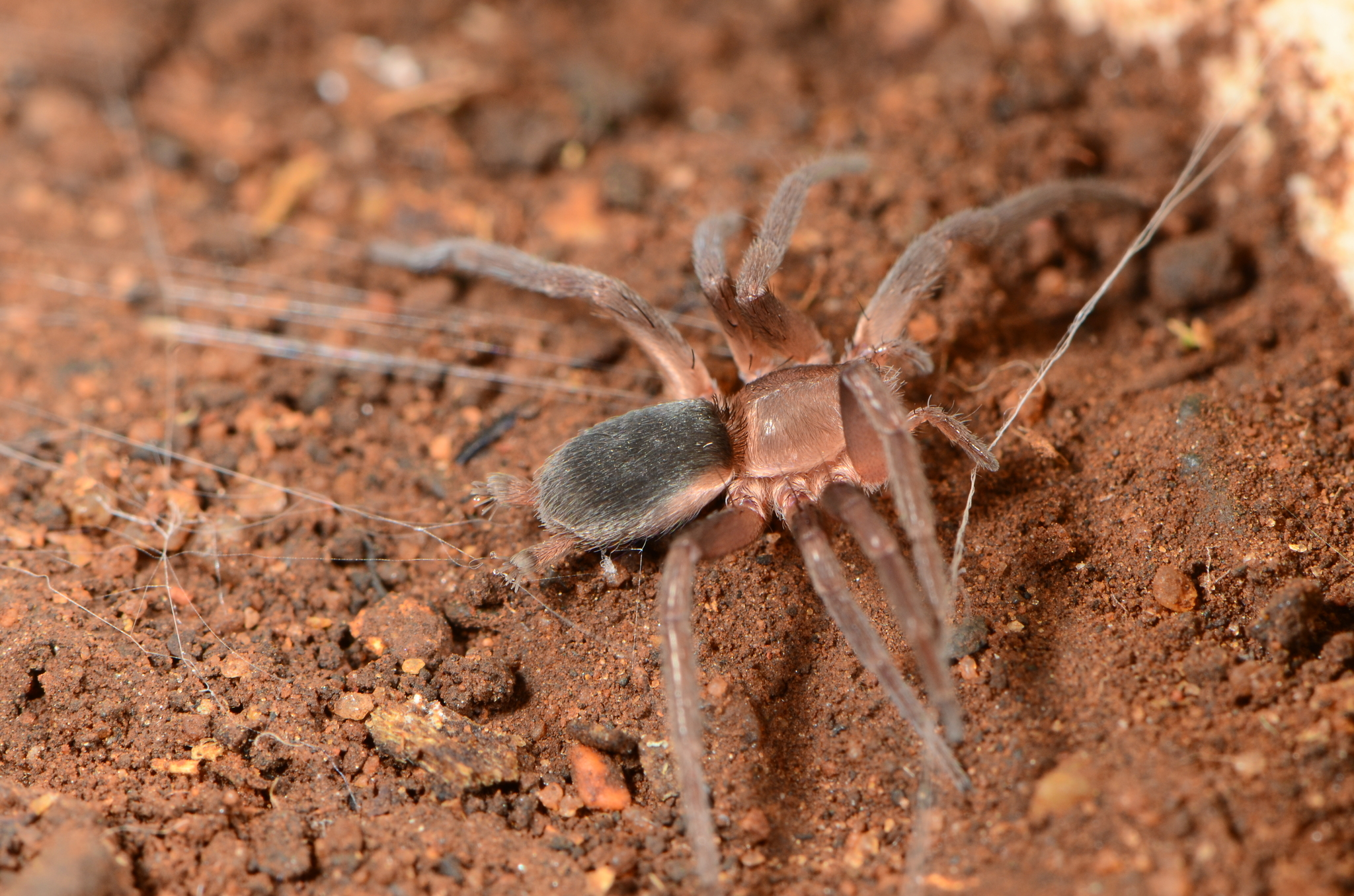
female T. cedri

Spiders in this genus have a body size of 7-9 mm. The carapace is uniform, yellow-cream to yellow-brown in color. They can be recognized by the inferior spinnerets that are twice as long and stout as the superior spinnerets and well separated.

The carapace is oval and rather flat. Eight eyes are arranged in two rows (4:4), with the posterior row recurved. The anterior median eyes are equal to or smaller than the lateral eyes. The chelicerae are well developed with a cheliceral furrow bearing teeth. The endites and labium are fairly long. The sternum is broad and oval, with the apex often projecting between coxae IV.

The opisthosoma is narrowly oblong and large relative to the carapace, with dark recumbent setae. The anterior spinnerets are well developed, and piriform gland spigots have greatly elongated bases bearing long, plumose setae. The legs have anterior tarsi and metatarsi that are well scopulate, with two claws. The legs are prograde, moderately long, and bear setae and spines.

The male palp is simple, with a long embolus curving around the bulb and a long retrolateral apophysis.

== Behavior and ecology ==
Very little is known about the behavior of Theuma spiders. They are free-living, nocturnal ground-dwellers that hide during the day under stones or debris on the ground. They are more commonly found in warm, dry regions.

== Taxonomy ==
The genus Theuma is relatively well-known owing to the work of Tucker (1923), Purcell (1907, 1908), and Lawrence (1947).

It was transferred from Prodidomidae to Gnaphosidae (Prodidominae) by Azevedo, Griswold & Santos (2018) but restored to Prodidomidae again by Azevedo et al. (2022).

== Species ==
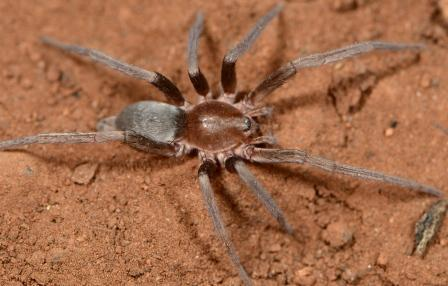
male T. elucubata

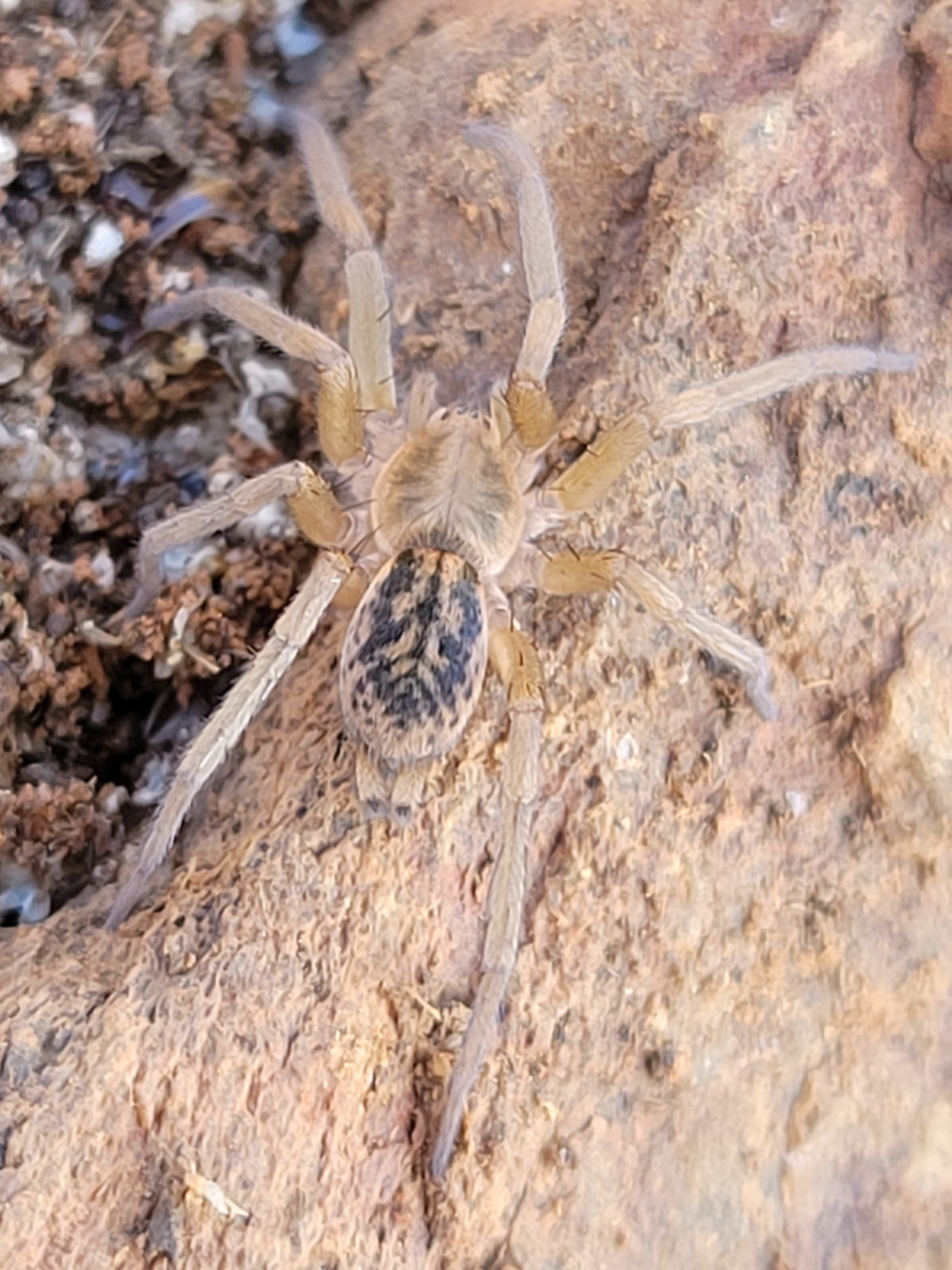
T. maculata

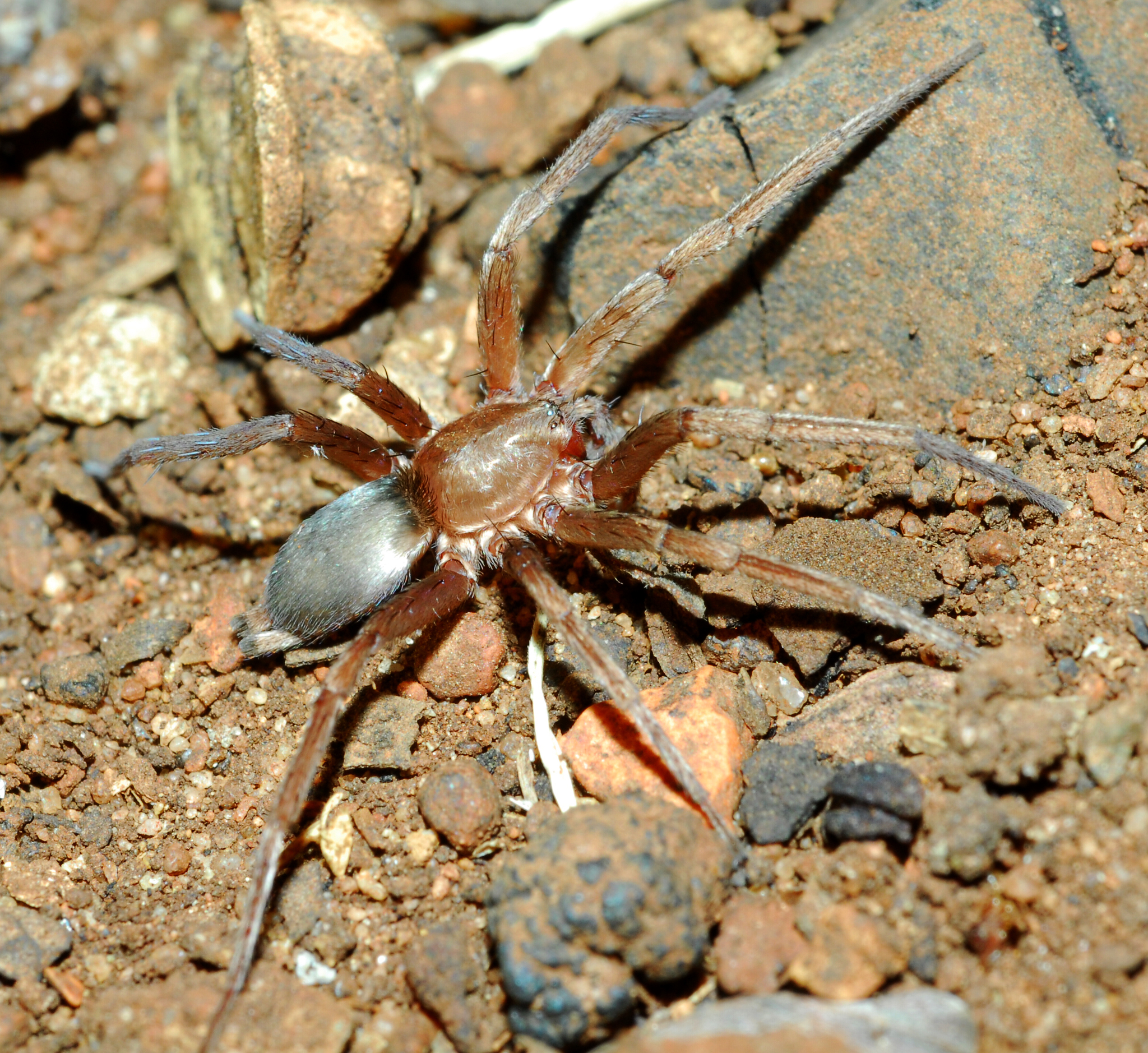
female T. parva

As of September 2025 it contains twenty-five species, found southern Africa:

- Theuma ababensis Tucker, 1923 – Namibia, Botswana, South Africa
- Theuma andonea Lawrence, 1927 – Namibia
- Theuma aprica Simon, 1893 – South Africa
- Theuma capensis Purcell, 1907 – Botswana, South Africa
- Theuma cedri Purcell, 1907 – South Africa
- Theuma elucubata Tucker, 1923 – South Africa
- Theuma foveolata Tucker, 1923 – Zimbabwe, South Africa
- Theuma funerea Lawrence, 1928 – Namibia
- Theuma fusca Purcell, 1907 – Namibia, Botswana, Zimbabwe, South Africa
- Theuma longipes Lawrence, 1927 – Namibia
- Theuma maculata Purcell, 1907 – Botswana, Zimbabwe, South Africa
- Theuma microphthalma Lawrence, 1928 – Namibia
- Theuma mutica Purcell, 1907 – South Africa
- Theuma ovambica Lawrence, 1927 – Namibia
- Theuma parva Purcell, 1907 – Zimbabwe, South Africa
- Theuma purcelli Tucker, 1923 – South Africa
- Theuma pusilla Purcell, 1908 – Namibia, South Africa
- Theuma recta Lawrence, 1927 – Namibia
- Theuma schreineri Purcell, 1907 – South Africa, Lesotho
- Theuma schultzei Purcell, 1908 – Namibia, South Africa
- Theuma tragardhi Lawrence, 1947 – South Africa
- Theuma velox Purcell, 1908 – Namibia
- Theuma walteri (Simon, 1889) – Turkmenistan? (type species)
- Theuma xylina Simon, 1893 – South Africa
- Theuma zuluensis Lawrence, 1947 – South Africa
