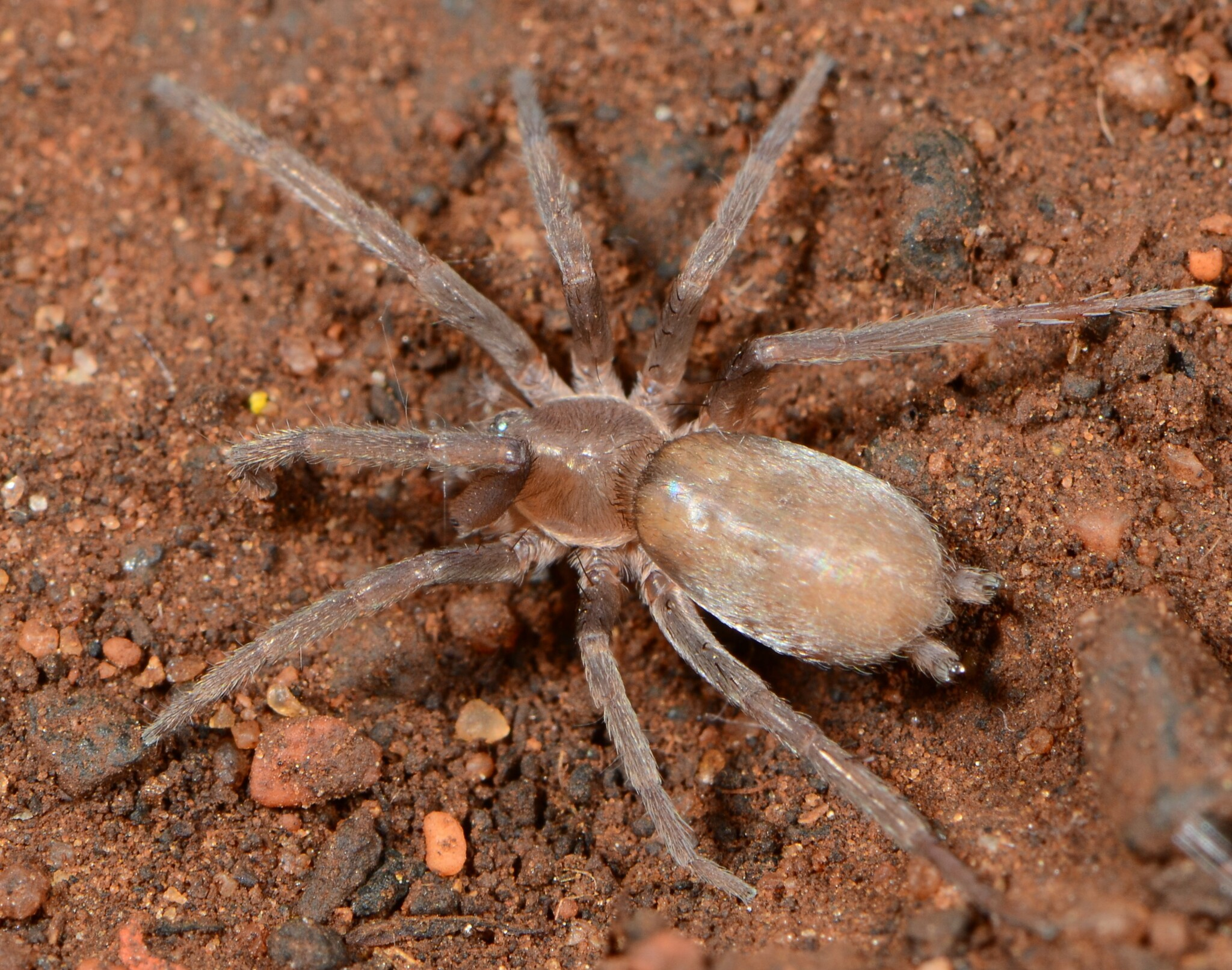
- Female
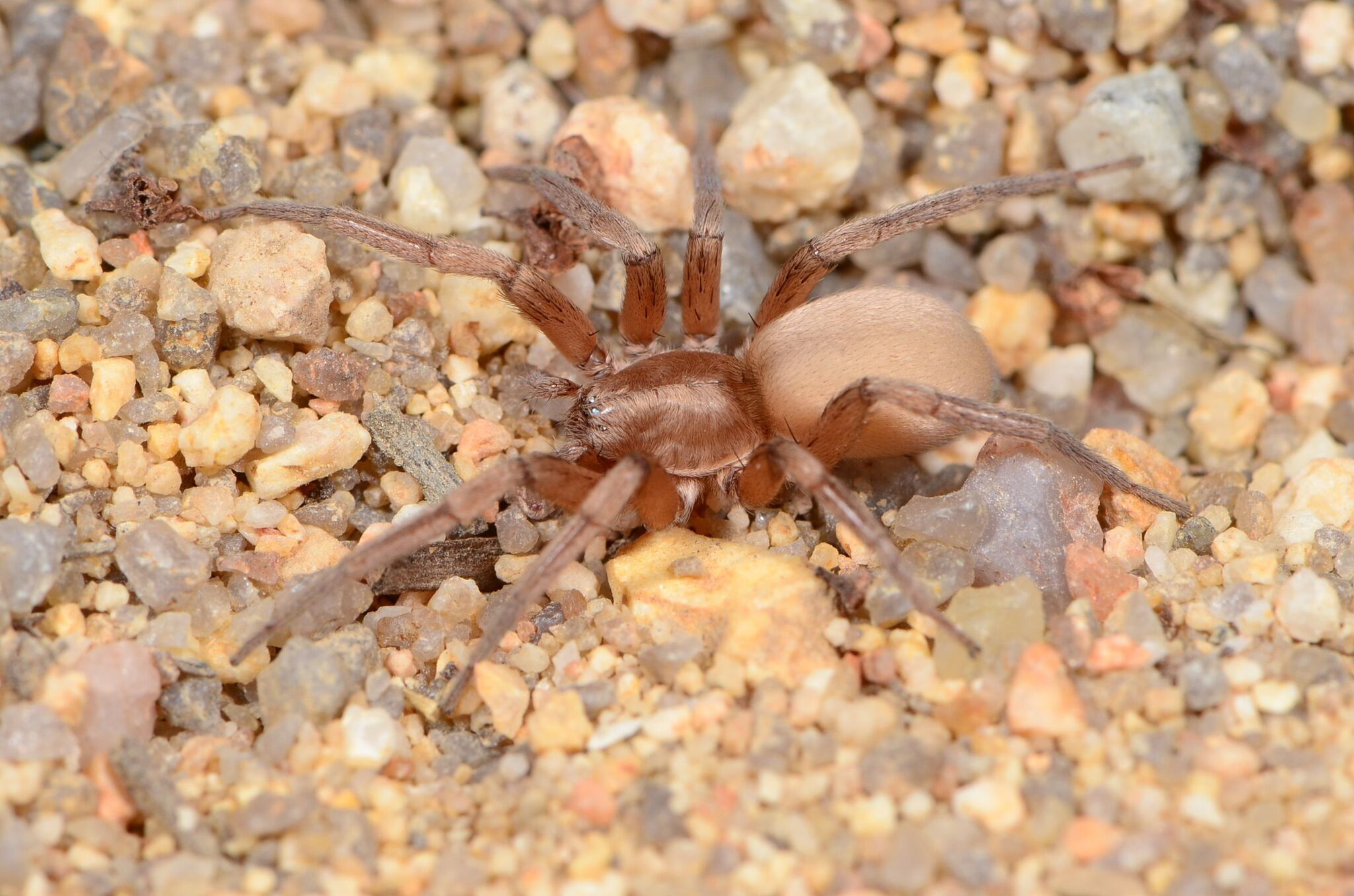
- Female

Scientific classification
- Kingdom: Animalia
- Phylum: Arthropoda
- Subphylum: Chelicerata
- Class: Arachnida
- Order: Araneae
- Infraorder: Araneomorphae
- Family: Prodidomidae
- Genus: Theuma
- Species: T. fusca

Binomial name
- Theuma fusca Purcell, 1907

= Theuma fusca =

Montagu Theuma Long-spinneret Ground Spider

Species of spider

Theuma fusca is a species of spider in the family Prodidomidae. It is a southern African endemic commonly known as the Montagu Theuma long-spinneret ground spider.

== Distribution ==
Theuma fusca occurs in Botswana, Zimbabwe, and South Africa.

In South Africa, it is recorded from Free State, KwaZulu-Natal, Limpopo, Northern Cape, and Western Cape. Notable locations include Hluhluwe Nature Reserve, Ndumo Game Reserve, Blouberg Nature Reserve, Kruger National Park, Swartberg Nature Reserve, and Cederberg Wilderness Area.

== Habitat and ecology ==
Theuma fusca is a free-running ground dweller found in all floral biomes except the Desert and Albany Thicket biomes at altitudes ranging from 32 to 1,523 m above sea level. It has been sampled from pistachio orchards and has been found associated with ant nests.

It was found living in an ant nest.

== Description ==
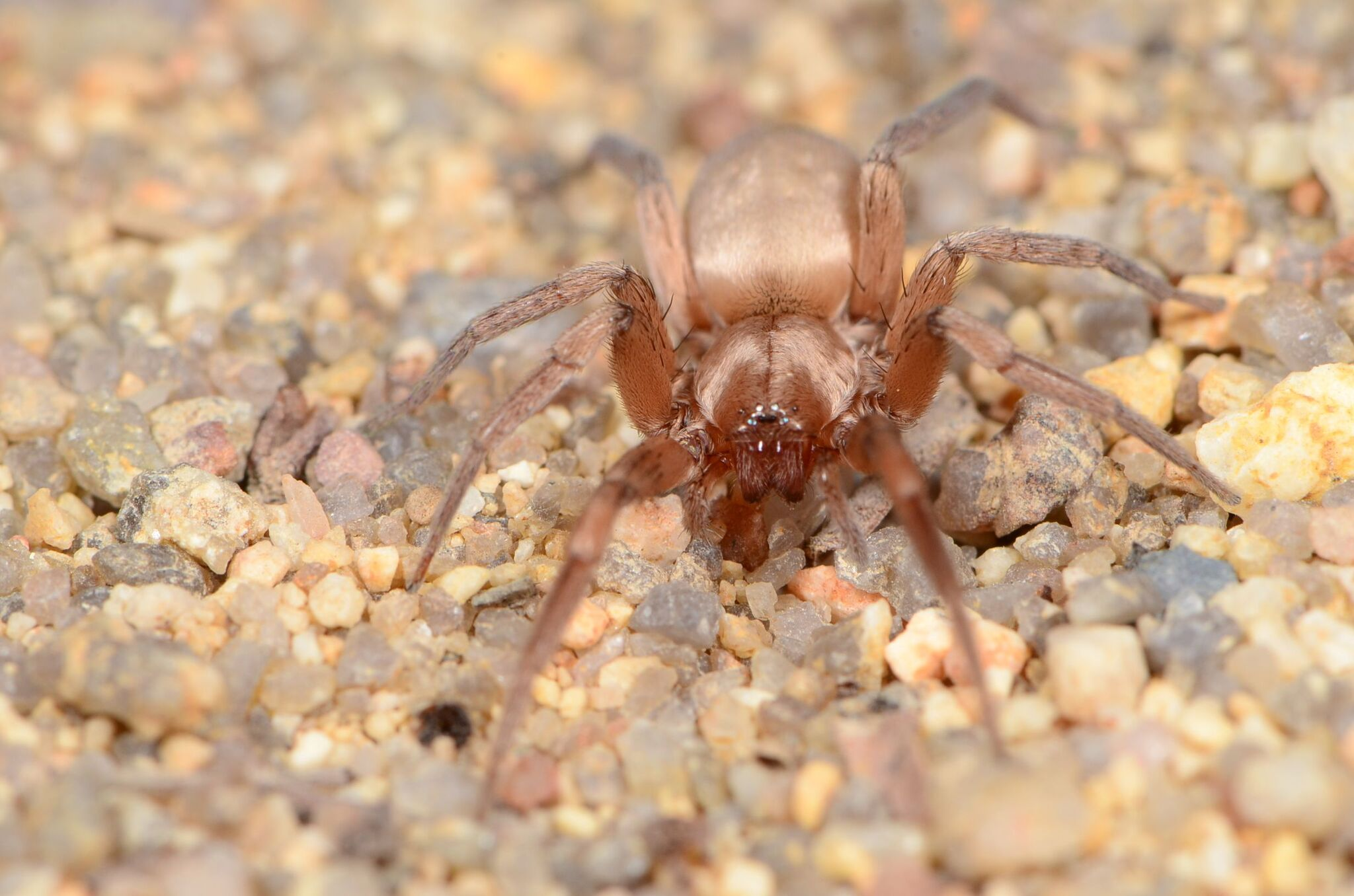

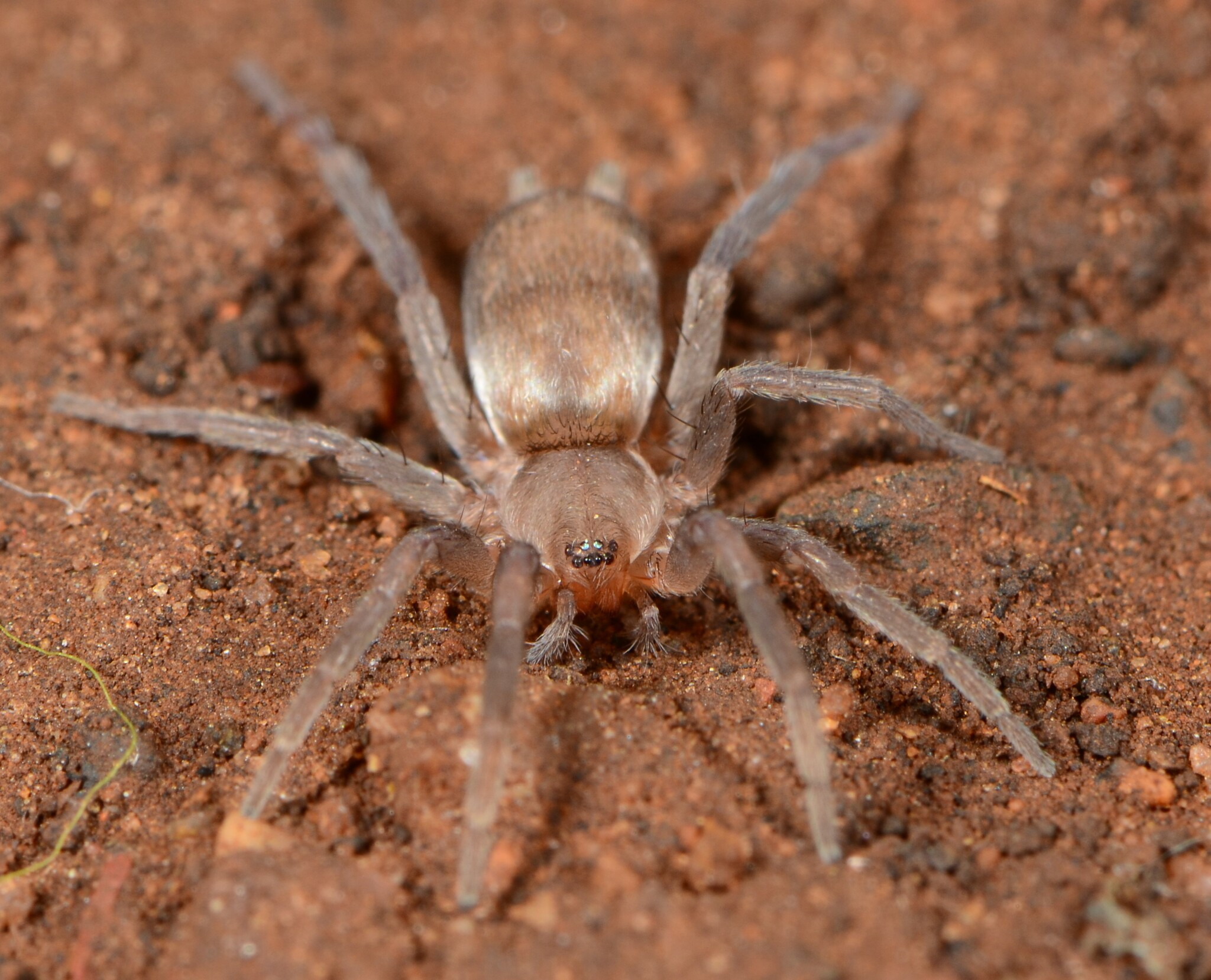

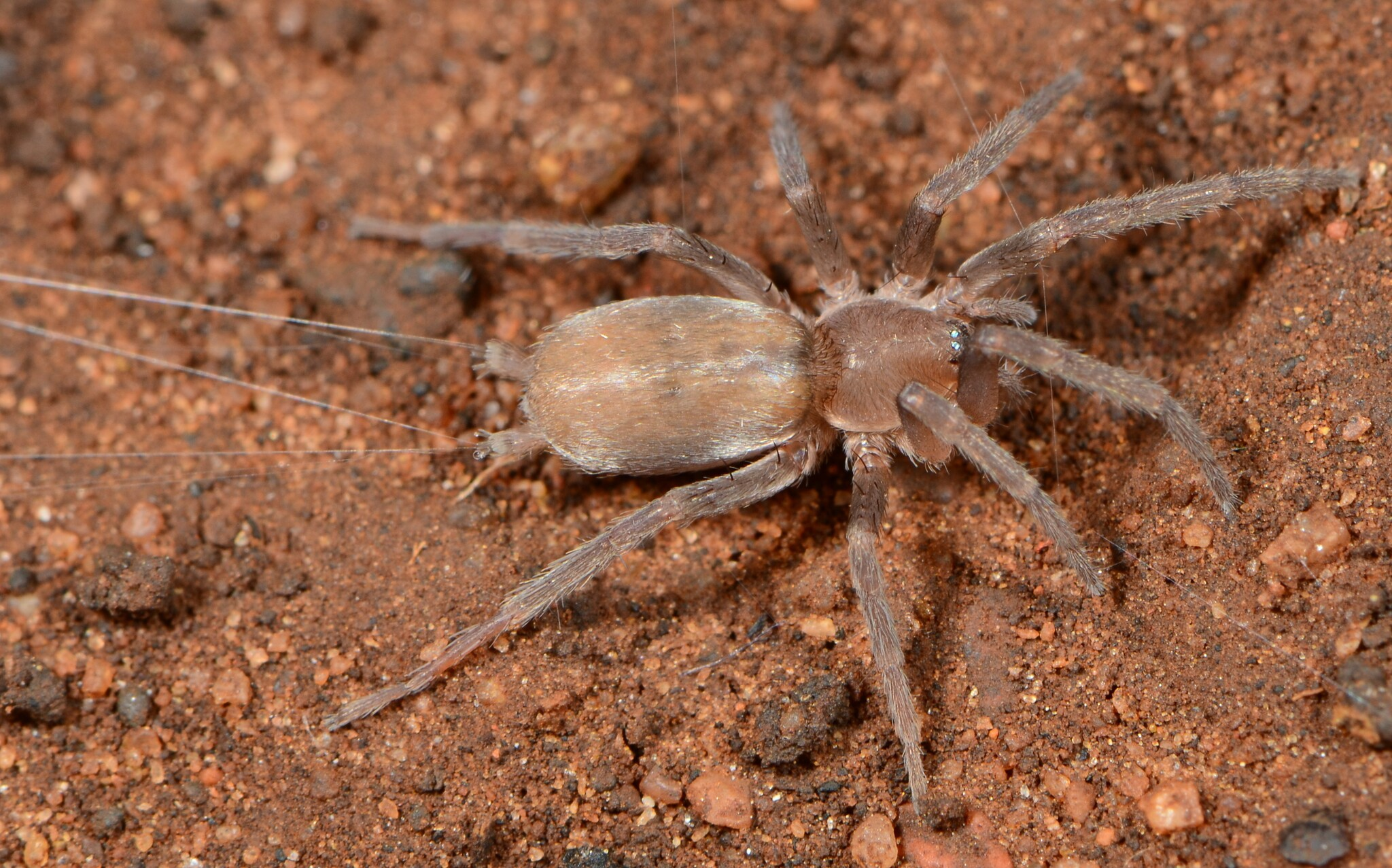
female, showing spinnerets

== Conservation ==
Theuma fusca is listed as Least Concern by the South African National Biodiversity Institute due to its wide distribution range. There are no significant threats to the species, and it is found in eight protected areas.

== Taxonomy ==
The species was originally described by William Frederick Purcell in 1907 from Montagu Baths in the Western Cape. It has not been revised but is known from both sexes.
