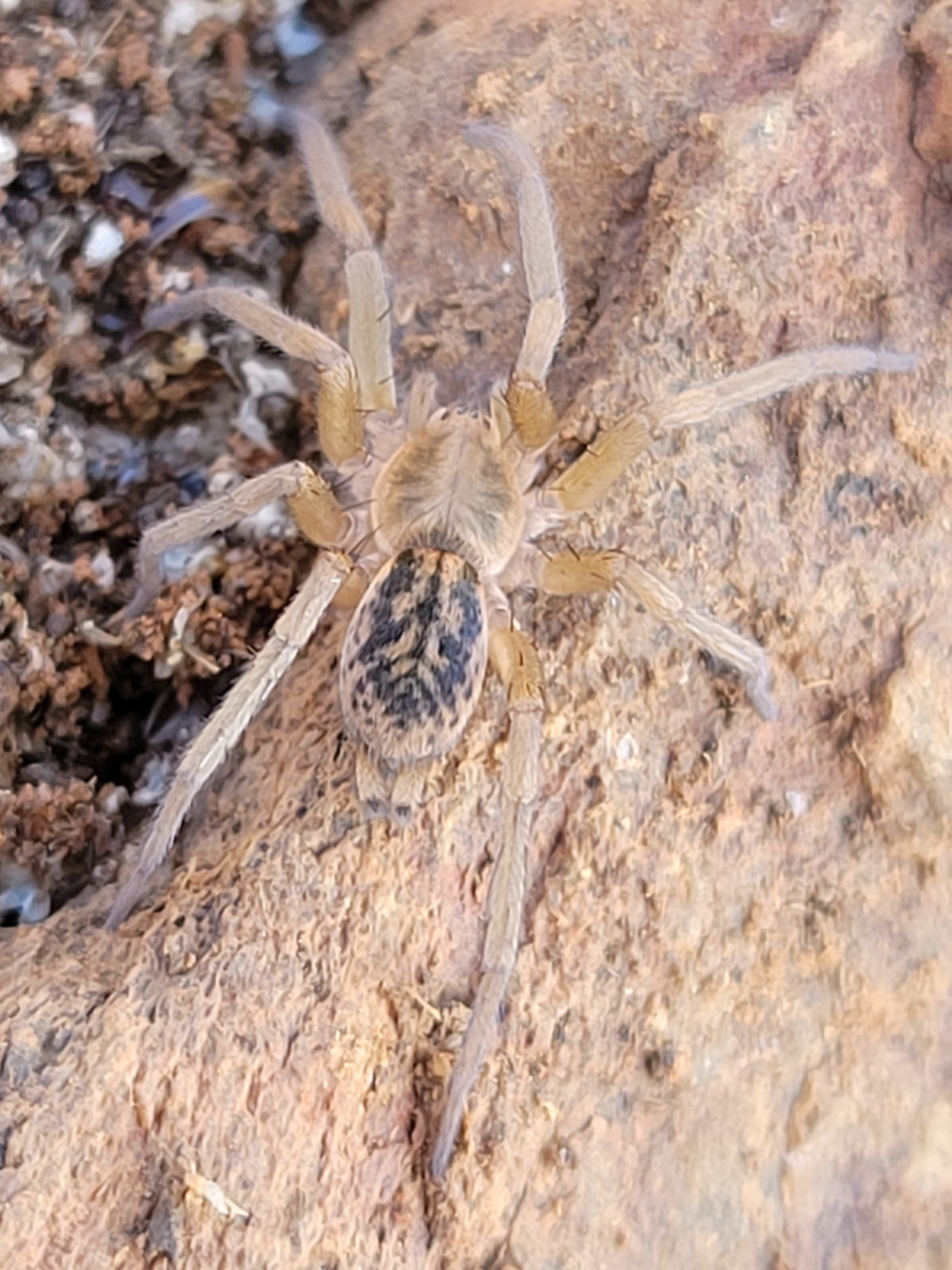
- female

Scientific classification
- Kingdom: Animalia
- Phylum: Arthropoda
- Subphylum: Chelicerata
- Class: Arachnida
- Order: Araneae
- Infraorder: Araneomorphae
- Family: Prodidomidae
- Genus: Theuma
- Species: T. maculata

Binomial name
- Theuma maculata Purcell, 1907

= Theuma maculata =

Beaufortwest Theuma Long Spinnered Ground Spider

Species of spider

Theuma maculata is a species of spider in the family Prodidomidae. It is a southern African endemic commonly known as the Beaufortwest Theuma long spinnered ground spider.

== Distribution ==
Theuma maculata occurs in Botswana, Zimbabwe, and South Africa.

In South Africa, it is recorded from Free State, KwaZulu-Natal, Limpopo, Mpumalanga, Northern Cape, and Western Cape. Notable locations include Ithala Nature Reserve, Ndumo Game Reserve, Augrabies National Park, Richtersveld Transfrontier National Park, Tswalu Nature Reserve, and Karoo National Park.

== Habitat and ecology ==
Theuma maculata is a free-running ground dweller found in Fynbos, Grassland, Nama Karoo, Savanna, and Succulent Karoo biomes at altitudes ranging from 140 to 1,593 m above sea level.

== Conservation ==
Theuma maculata is listed as Least Concern by the South African National Biodiversity Institute due to its wide geographical range. There are no significant threats to the species, and it is protected in more than ten protected areas.

== Taxonomy ==
The species was originally described by William Frederick Purcell in 1907 from Beaufort West in the Western Cape. It has not been revised but is known from both sexes.
