= Austrodomus scaber =

Prince Alfred Austrodomus Pale Ground Spider

Conservation status
- Least Concern (SANBI Red List)

Scientific classification
- Kingdom: Animalia
- Phylum: Arthropoda
- Subphylum: Chelicerata
- Class: Arachnida
- Order: Araneae
- Infraorder: Araneomorphae
- Family: Prodidomidae
- Genus: Austrodomus
- Species: A. scaber

Binomial name
- Austrodomus scaber (Purcell, 1904)

Species of spider

Austrodomus scaber is a species of spider in the family Gnaphosidae. It is found in Namibia and South Africa and is commonly known as the Prince Alfred Austrodomus pale ground spider.

== Distribution ==
Austrodomus scaber is known from Namibia and South Africa. In South Africa, it occurs in three provinces: Limpopo, Northern Cape, and Western Cape.

== Habitat and ecology ==
The species is a free-running ground dweller found at altitudes ranging from 614 to 1,593 m above sea level. It has been sampled from Grassland, Savanna, and Nama Karoo biomes.

== Description ==
Austrodomus scaber is known from both sexes.

== Conservation ==
Austrodomus scaber is listed as Least Concern by the South African National Biodiversity Institute due to its wide geographical range. The species is protected in several reserves including Blouberg Nature Reserve, Luvhondo Nature Reserve, Nwanedi Nature Reserve, Gamkaberg Nature Reserve, and Augrabies National Park.

== Taxonomy ==
The species was originally described by W. F. Purcell in 1904 as Prodidomus scaber from Prince Albert in the Western Cape. The genus Austrodomus was transferred from Prodidomidae to Gnaphosidae (subfamily Prodidominae) by Azevedo, Griswold & Santos in 2018. The genus was revised by Rodrigues & Rheims in 2020.
