= Theuma aprica =

Scientific classification
- Kingdom: Animalia
- Phylum: Arthropoda
- Subphylum: Chelicerata
- Class: Arachnida
- Order: Araneae
- Infraorder: Araneomorphae
- Family: Prodidomidae
- Genus: Theuma
- Species: T. aprica

Binomial name
- Theuma aprica Simon, 1893

Species of spider

Theuma aprica is a species of spider in the family Prodidomidae. It is a South African endemic.

== Distribution ==
Theuma aprica is known only from South Africa, though no exact locality is recorded for this species.

== Habitat and ecology ==
The species is a free running ground dweller.

== Conservation ==
Theuma aprica is listed as Data Deficient for Taxonomic reasons. Too little is known about the location, habitat and threats of this taxon for an assessment to be made. More sampling is needed to collect the male and determine the species' range.

== Taxonomy ==
The species was originally described by Eugène Simon in 1893 with the type locality given only as South Africa. It has not been revised and is known only from the female sex. The species requires redescription and additional sampling.
