= Lygrommatoides =

Scientific classification
- Kingdom: Animalia
- Phylum: Arthropoda
- Subphylum: Chelicerata
- Class: Arachnida
- Order: Araneae
- Infraorder: Araneomorphae
- Family: Prodidomidae
- Genus: Lygrommatoides; Strand, 1918
- Species: L. problematica

Binomial name
- Lygrommatoides problematica Strand, 1918

Genus of spiders

Lygrommatoides is a monotypic genus of Japanese long-spinneret ground spiders containing the single species, Lygrommatoides problematica. It was first described by Embrik Strand in 1918, and is only found in Japan.
