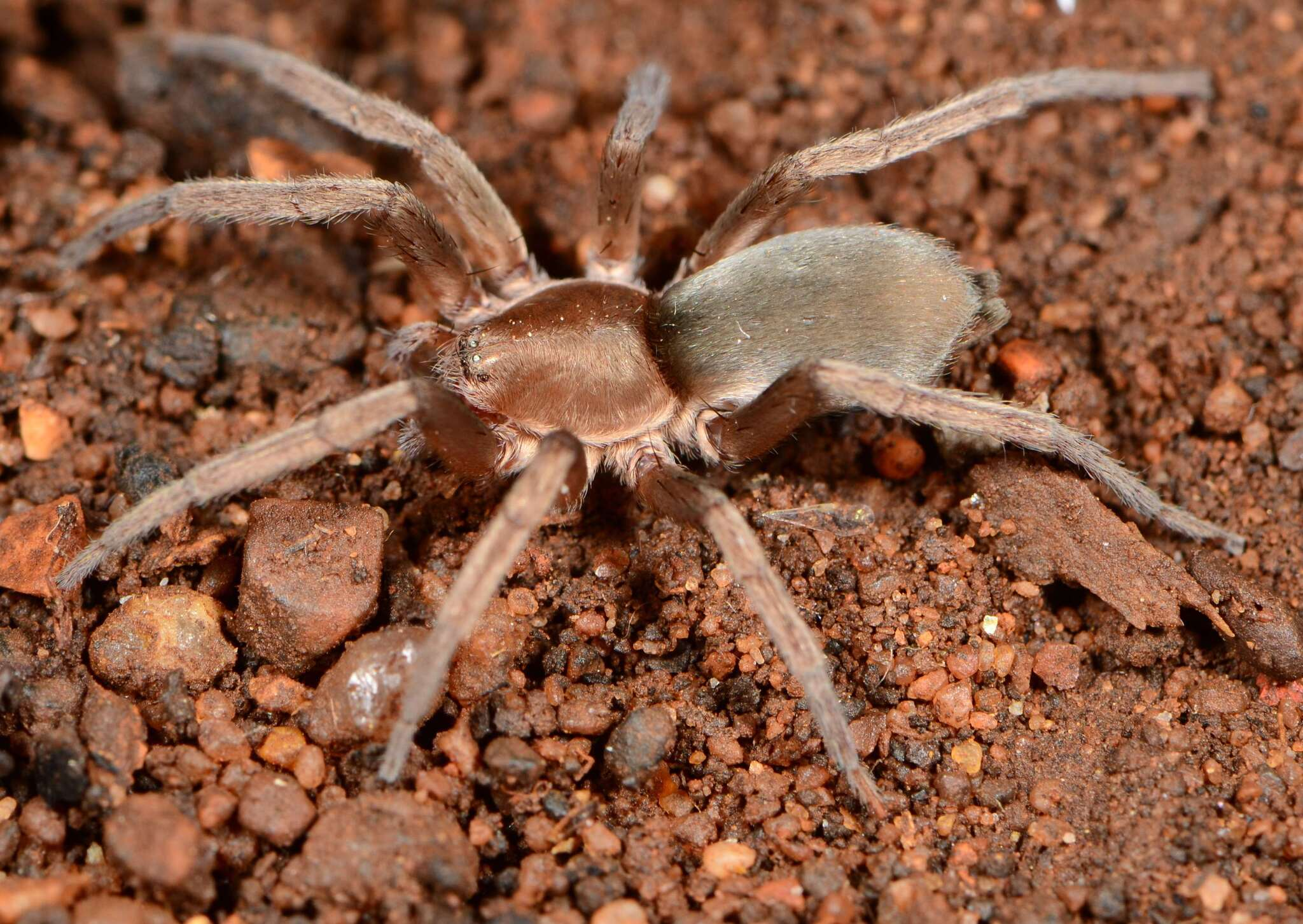
- Female
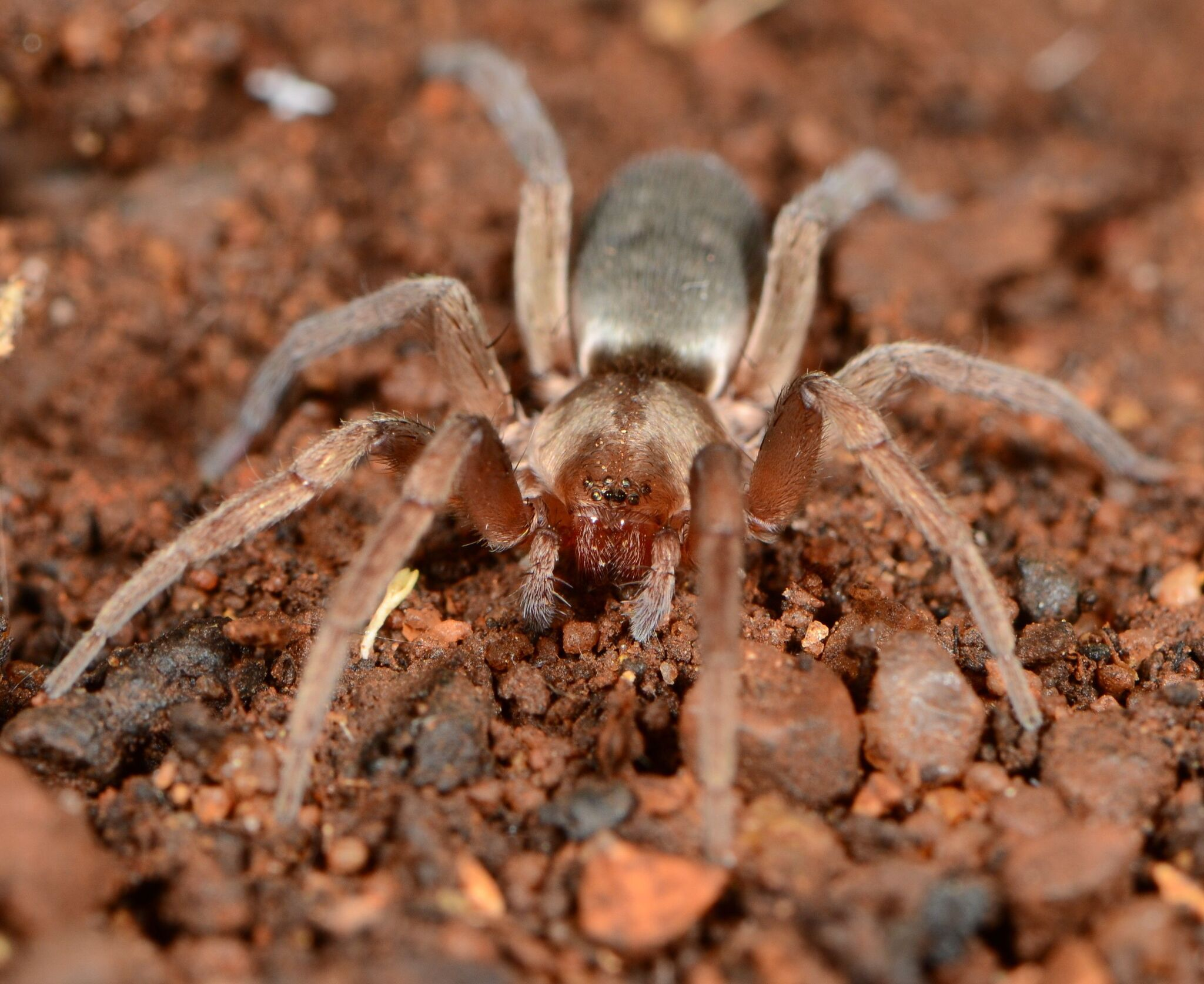
- Female

Scientific classification
- Kingdom: Animalia
- Phylum: Arthropoda
- Subphylum: Chelicerata
- Class: Arachnida
- Order: Araneae
- Infraorder: Araneomorphae
- Family: Prodidomidae
- Genus: Theuma
- Species: T. cedri

Binomial name
- Theuma cedri Purcell, 1907

= Theuma cedri =

Cederberg Theuma Long-spinneret Ground Spider

Species of spider

Theuma cedri is a species of spider in the family Prodidomidae. It is a South African endemic commonly known as the Cederberg Theuma long-spinneret ground spider.

== Distribution ==
Theuma cedri is known only from South Africa, where it is recorded from Free State, Limpopo, Northern Cape, and Western Cape.

Notable locations include Boschkloof Waterfall in the Cederberg, Namaqua National Park, and Cederberg Wilderness Area.

== Habitat and ecology ==
Theuma cedri is a free-running ground dweller found in Fynbos, Grassland, and Savanna biomes. The species inhabits altitudes ranging from 24 to 1,645 m above sea level.

== Description ==
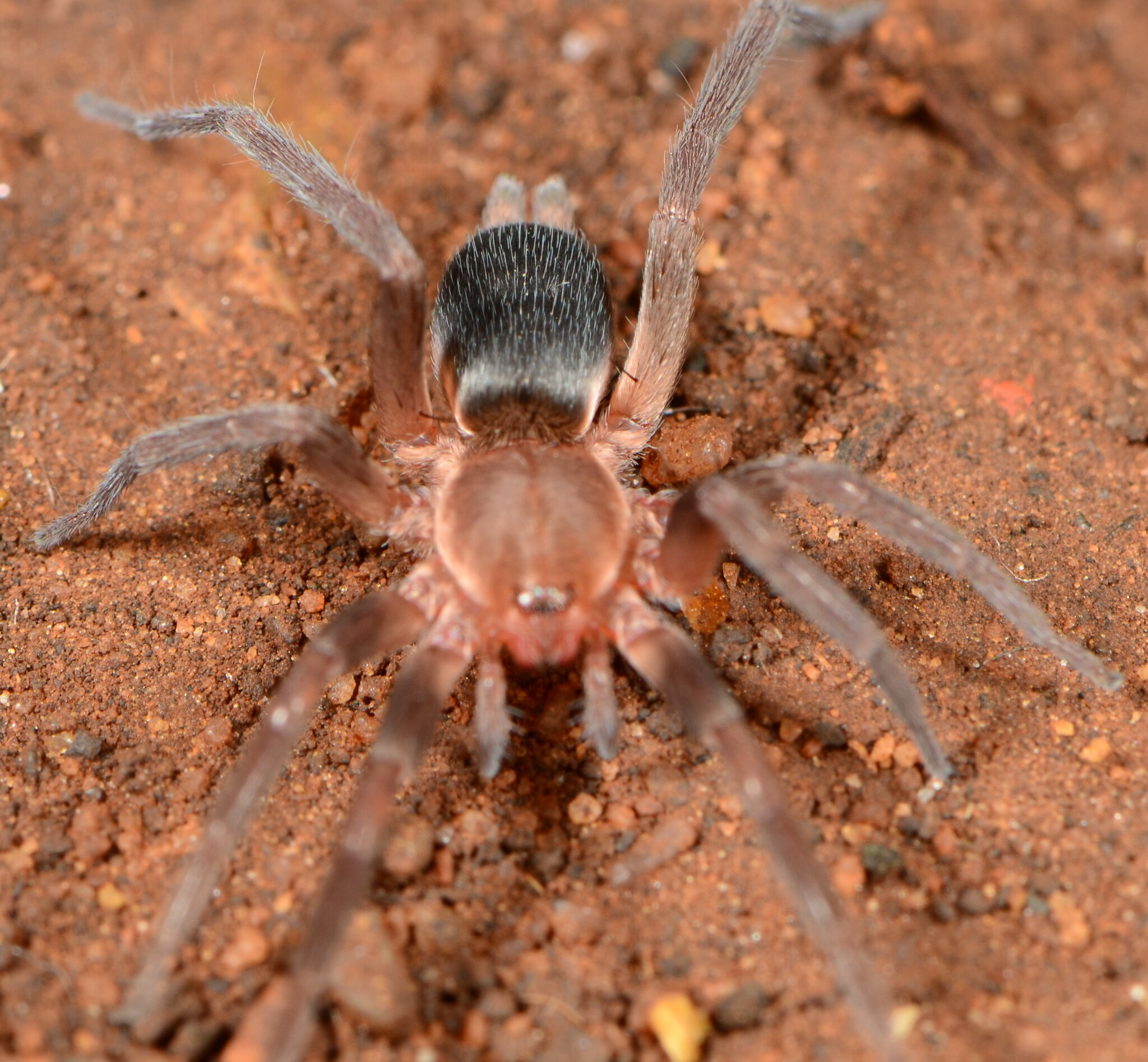
female

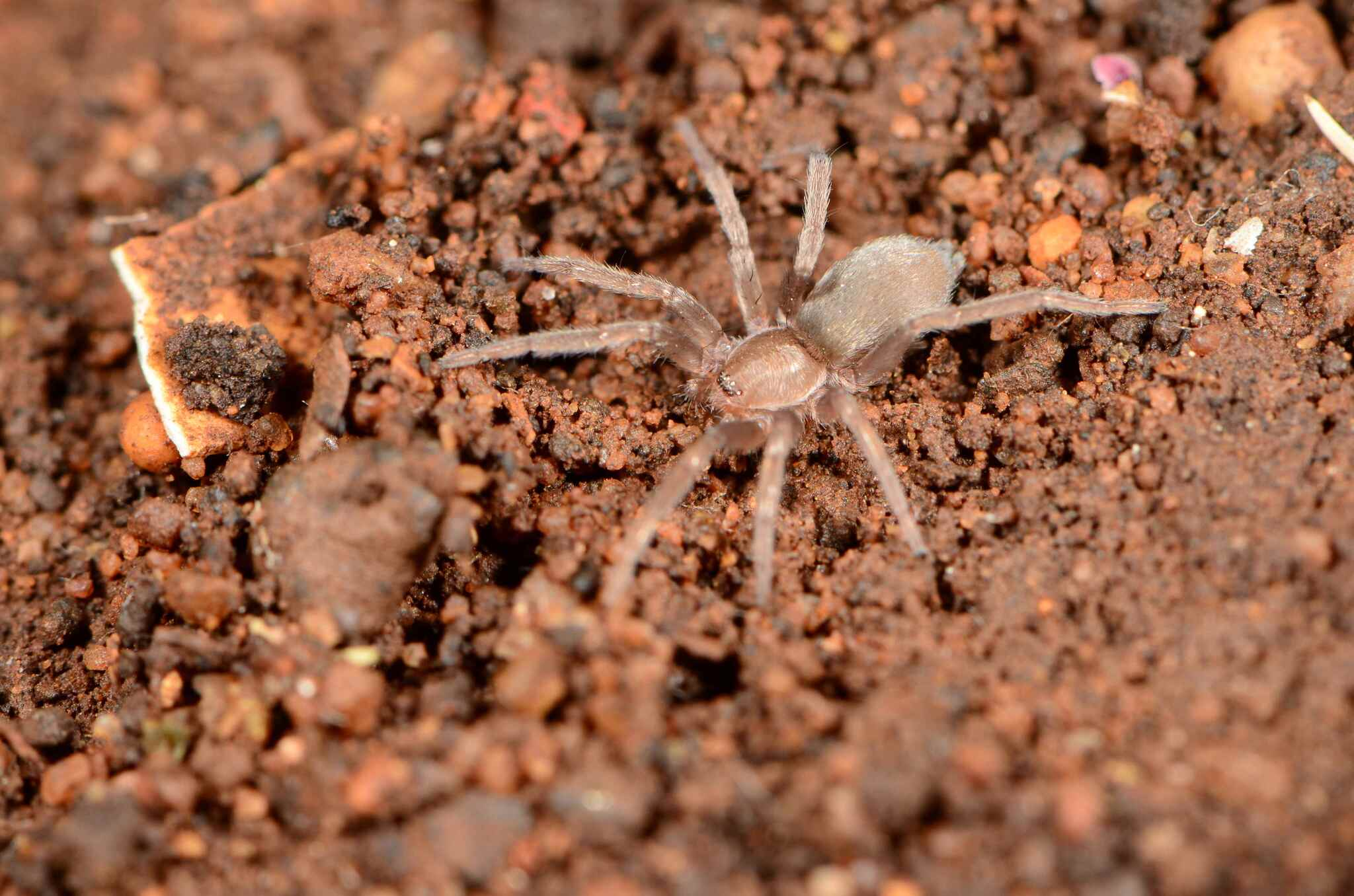
female

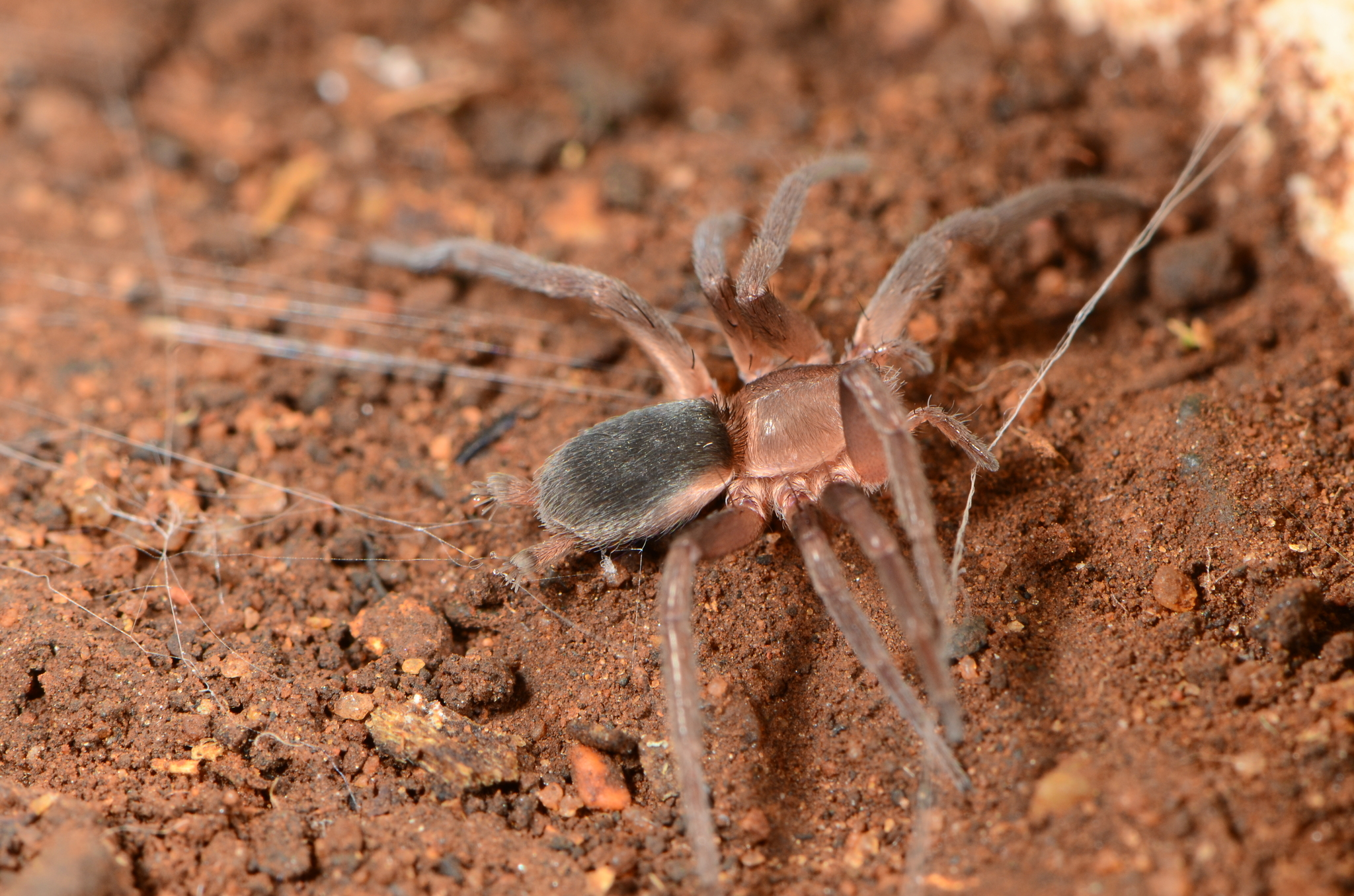
female

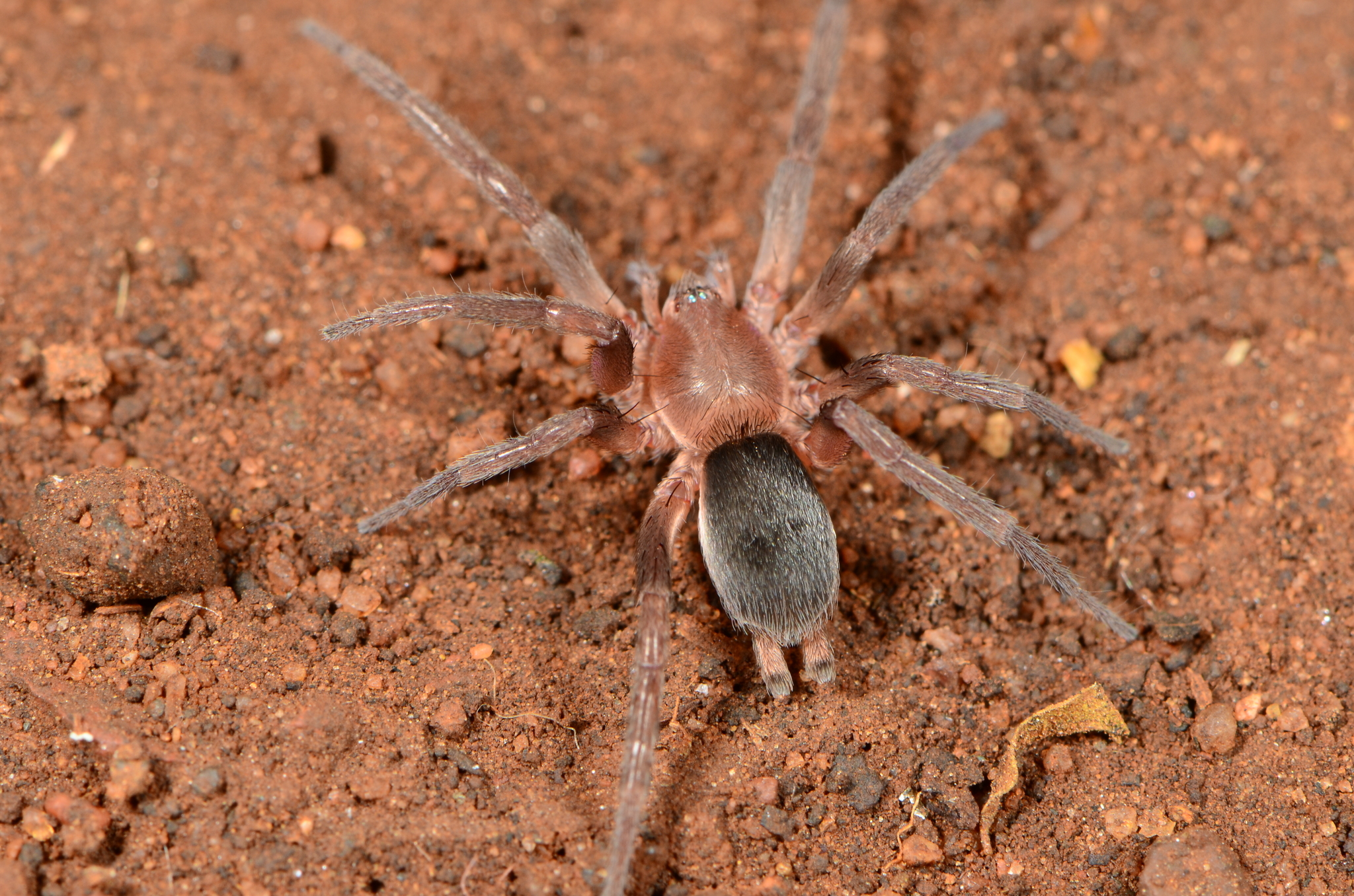
female

== Conservation ==
Theuma cedri is listed as Least Concern by the South African National Biodiversity Institute. Although the species is presently known only from one sex, it has a wide geographical range. There are no significant threats to the species, but more sampling is needed to collect the male. It is protected in Namaqua National Park and Cederberg Wilderness Area.

== Taxonomy ==
The species was originally described by William Frederick Purcell in 1907 from Boschkloof Waterfall in the Cederberg in the Western Cape. It has not been revised and is known only from the female sex.
