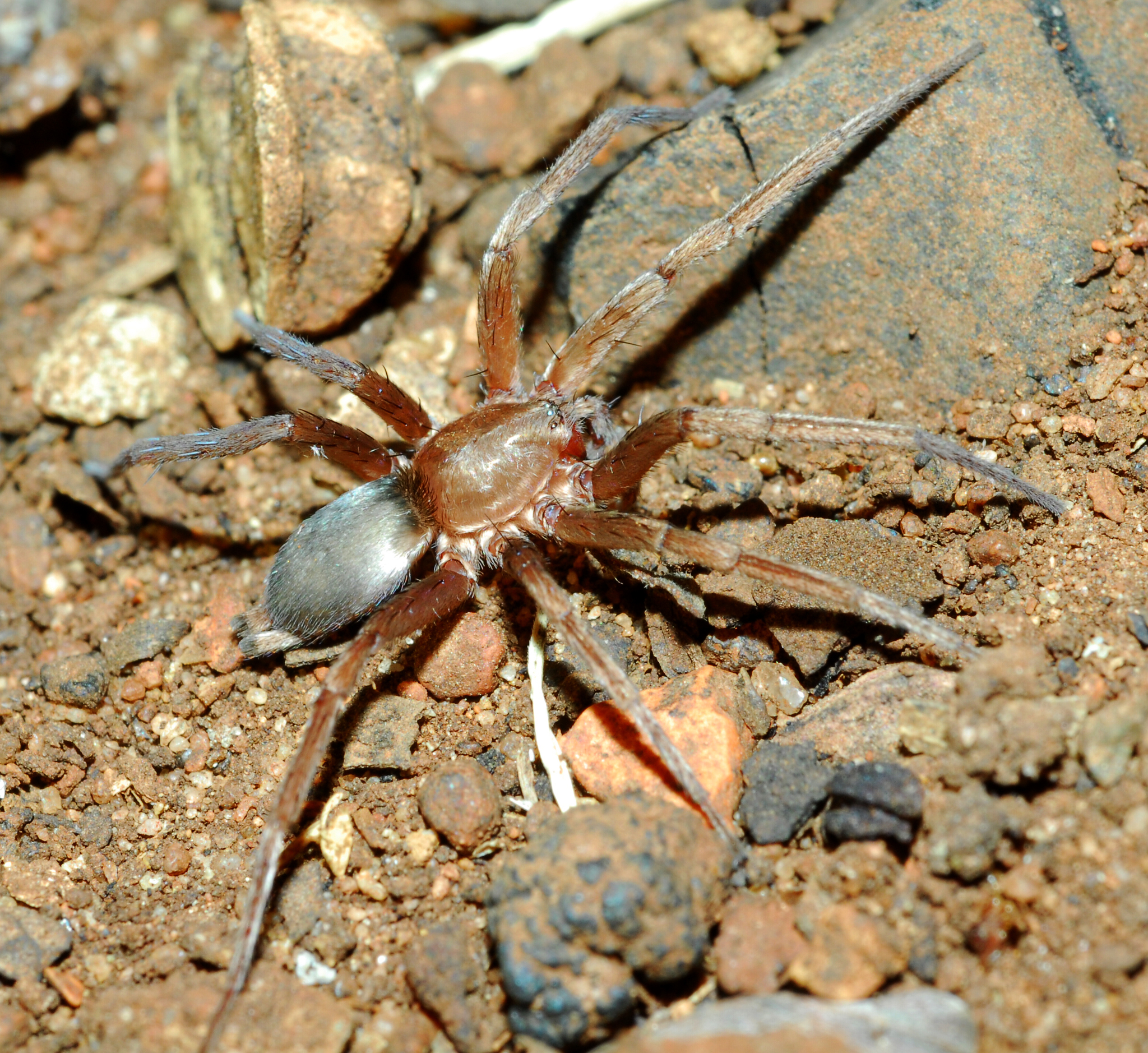
- Female
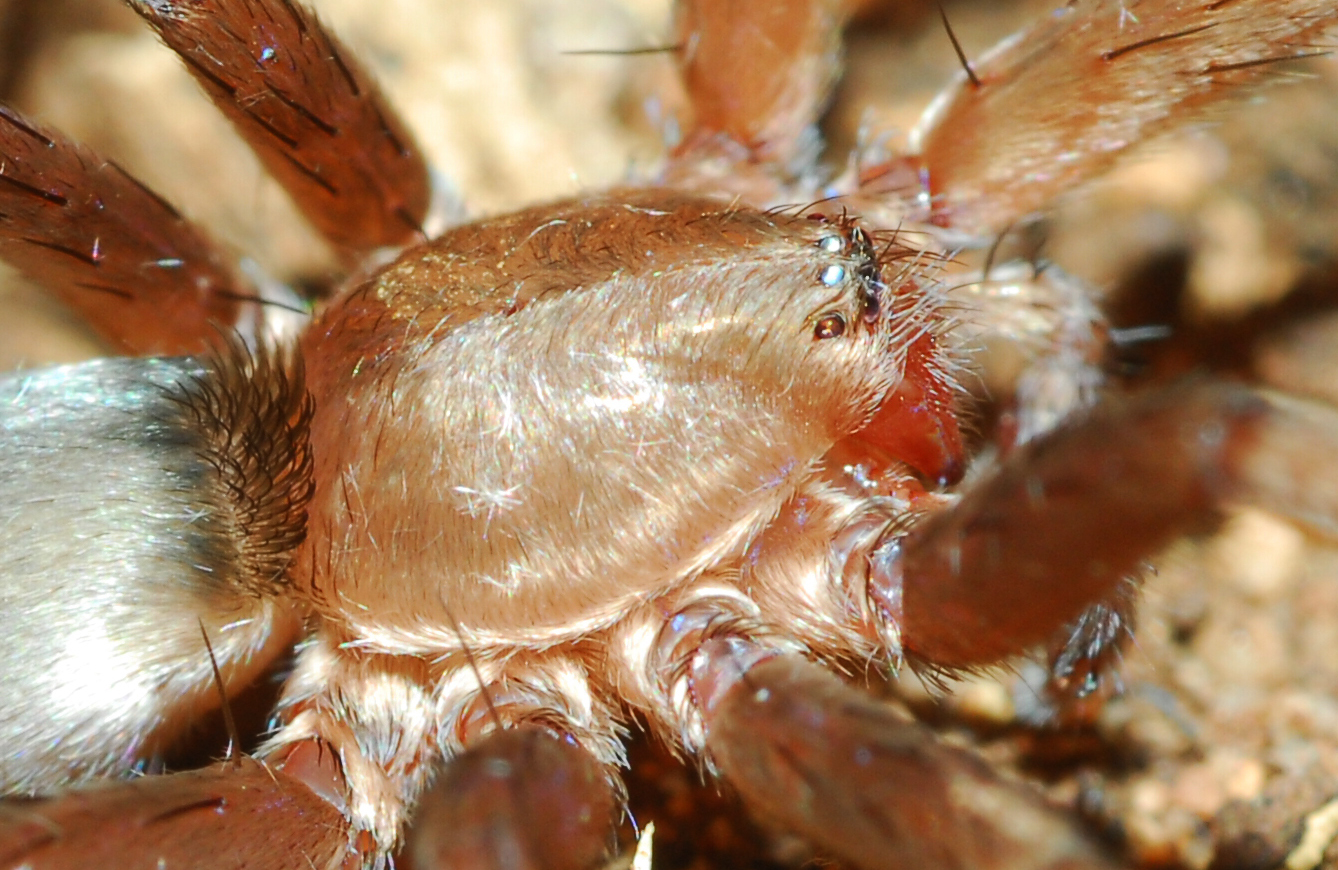
- Female

Scientific classification
- Kingdom: Animalia
- Phylum: Arthropoda
- Subphylum: Chelicerata
- Class: Arachnida
- Order: Araneae
- Infraorder: Araneomorphae
- Family: Prodidomidae
- Genus: Theuma
- Species: T. parva

Binomial name
- Theuma parva Purcell, 1907

= Theuma parva =

Eierfontein Theuma Long Spinneret Ground Spider

Species of spider

Theuma parva is a species of spider in the family Prodidomidae. It is a southern African endemic commonly known as the Eierfontein Theuma long spinneret ground spider.

== Distribution ==
Theuma parva occurs in Zimbabwe and South Africa.

In South Africa, it is recorded from Gauteng, KwaZulu-Natal, Limpopo, and Northern Cape. Notable locations include Johannesburg, iSimangaliso Wetland Park, Polokwane Nature Reserve, and Eierfontein.

== Habitat and ecology ==
Theuma parva is a free-running ground dweller found in Grassland, Nama Karoo, and Savanna biomes at altitudes ranging from 6 to 1,762 m above sea level.

== Conservation ==
Theuma parva is listed as Least Concern by the South African National Biodiversity Institute due to its wide geographical range. There are no significant threats to the species, and it is protected in three protected areas, Ezemvelo Nature Reserve, Klipriviersberg Nature Reserve, and Polokwane Nature Reserve.

== Taxonomy ==
The species was originally described by William Frederick Purcell in 1907 from Eierfontein in the Northern Cape. It has not been revised and is known only from the male sex. The female still needs to be described.
