= Theuma schultzei =

Steinkopf Theuma Long Spinneret Ground Spider

Conservation status
- Least Concern (SANBI Red List)

Scientific classification
- Kingdom: Animalia
- Phylum: Arthropoda
- Subphylum: Chelicerata
- Class: Arachnida
- Order: Araneae
- Infraorder: Araneomorphae
- Family: Prodidomidae
- Genus: Theuma
- Species: T. schultzei

Binomial name
- Theuma schultzei Purcell, 1908

Species of spider

Theuma schultzei is a species of spider in the family Prodidomidae. It is a South African endemic commonly known as the Steinkopf Theuma long spinneret ground spider.

== Distribution ==
Theuma schultzei is known only from South Africa, where it is recorded from two provinces, North West and Northern Cape.

Notable locations include Hartbeesfontein, Kalahari Gemsbok National Park, Kamaggas, Steinkopf, and Richtersveld Transfrontier National Park.

== Habitat and ecology ==
Theuma schultzei is a free-living ground dweller found in Grassland, Desert, Savanna, and Succulent Karoo biomes. The species inhabits altitudes ranging from 231 to 1,540 m above sea level.

== Conservation ==
Theuma schultzei is listed as Least Concern by the South African National Biodiversity Institute. Although the species is presently known only from one sex, it has a wide geographical range. There are no significant threats to the species, and it is protected in Kalahari Gemsbok National Park and Richtersveld Transfrontier National Park.

== Taxonomy ==
The species was originally described by William Frederick Purcell in 1908 from Steinkopf in the Northern Cape. It has not been revised and is known only from the female sex.
