= Theuma zuluensis =

Scientific classification
- Kingdom: Animalia
- Phylum: Arthropoda
- Subphylum: Chelicerata
- Class: Arachnida
- Order: Araneae
- Infraorder: Araneomorphae
- Family: Prodidomidae
- Genus: Theuma
- Species: T. zuluensis

Binomial name
- Theuma zuluensis Lawrence, 1947

Species of spider

Theuma zuluensis is a species of spider in the family Prodidomidae. It is a KwaZulu-Natal endemic.

== Distribution ==
Theuma zuluensis is known only from South Africa, specifically from KwaZulu-Natal province.

Notable locations include Ophathe Game Reserve, Umfolozi Nature Reserve, and iSimangaliso Wetland Park.

== Habitat and ecology ==
Theuma zuluensis is a free-living ground dweller found in the Savanna biome. The species inhabits altitudes ranging from 83 to 405 m above sea level.

== Conservation ==
Theuma zuluensis is listed as Data Deficient for Taxonomic reasons. Threats to the species are unknown. More sampling is needed to collect the male and determine the species' range. The species is known from three protected areas, Ophathe Game Reserve, Umfolozi Nature Reserve, and Mkuze Nature Reserve.

== Taxonomy ==
The species was originally described by Reginald Frederick Lawrence in 1947 from Umfolosi Drift. It has not been revised and is known only from the female sex.
