= Caudalia =

Scientific classification
- Kingdom: Animalia
- Phylum: Arthropoda
- Subphylum: Chelicerata
- Class: Arachnida
- Order: Araneae
- Infraorder: Araneomorphae
- Family: Prodidomidae
- Genus: Caudalia; Alayón, 1980
- Species: C. insularis

Binomial name
- Caudalia insularis Alayón, 1980

Genus of spiders

Caudalia is a monotypic genus of long-spinneret ground spiders containing the single species, Caudalia insularis. It was first described by G. Alayón G. in 1980, and is only found on the Greater Antilles.
