= Plutonodomus =

Scientific classification
- Kingdom: Animalia
- Phylum: Arthropoda
- Subphylum: Chelicerata
- Class: Arachnida
- Order: Araneae
- Infraorder: Araneomorphae
- Family: Prodidomidae
- Genus: Plutonodomus; Cooke, 1964
- Species: P. kungwensis

Binomial name
- Plutonodomus kungwensis Cooke, 1964

Genus of spiders

Plutonodomus is a monotypic genus of Tanzanian long-spinneret ground spiders containing the single species, Plutonodomus kungwensis. It was first described by J. A. L. Cooke in 1964, and is only found in Tanzania. It was transferred to the ground spiders in 2018, then returned to Prodidominae in 2022.
