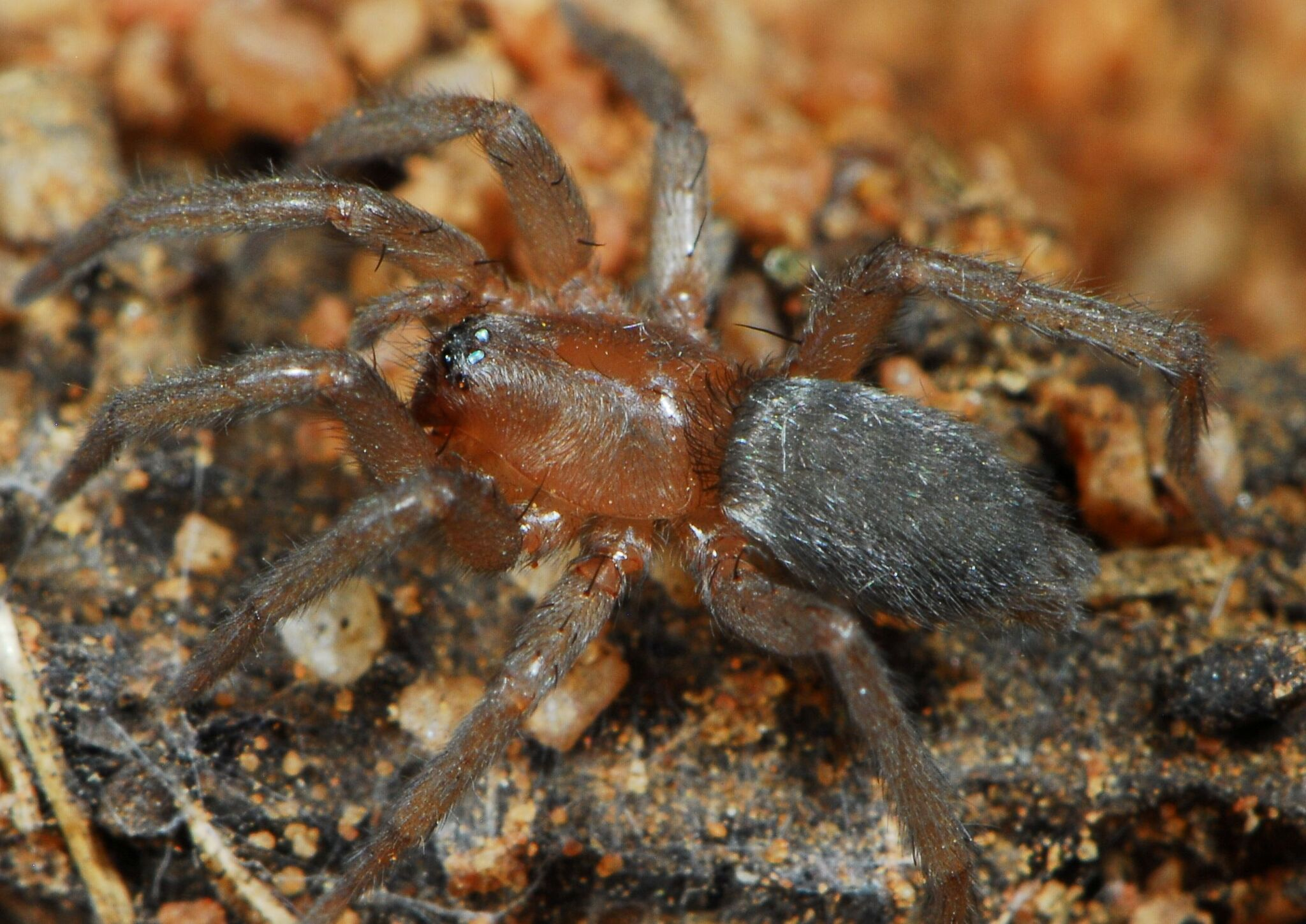
- Male
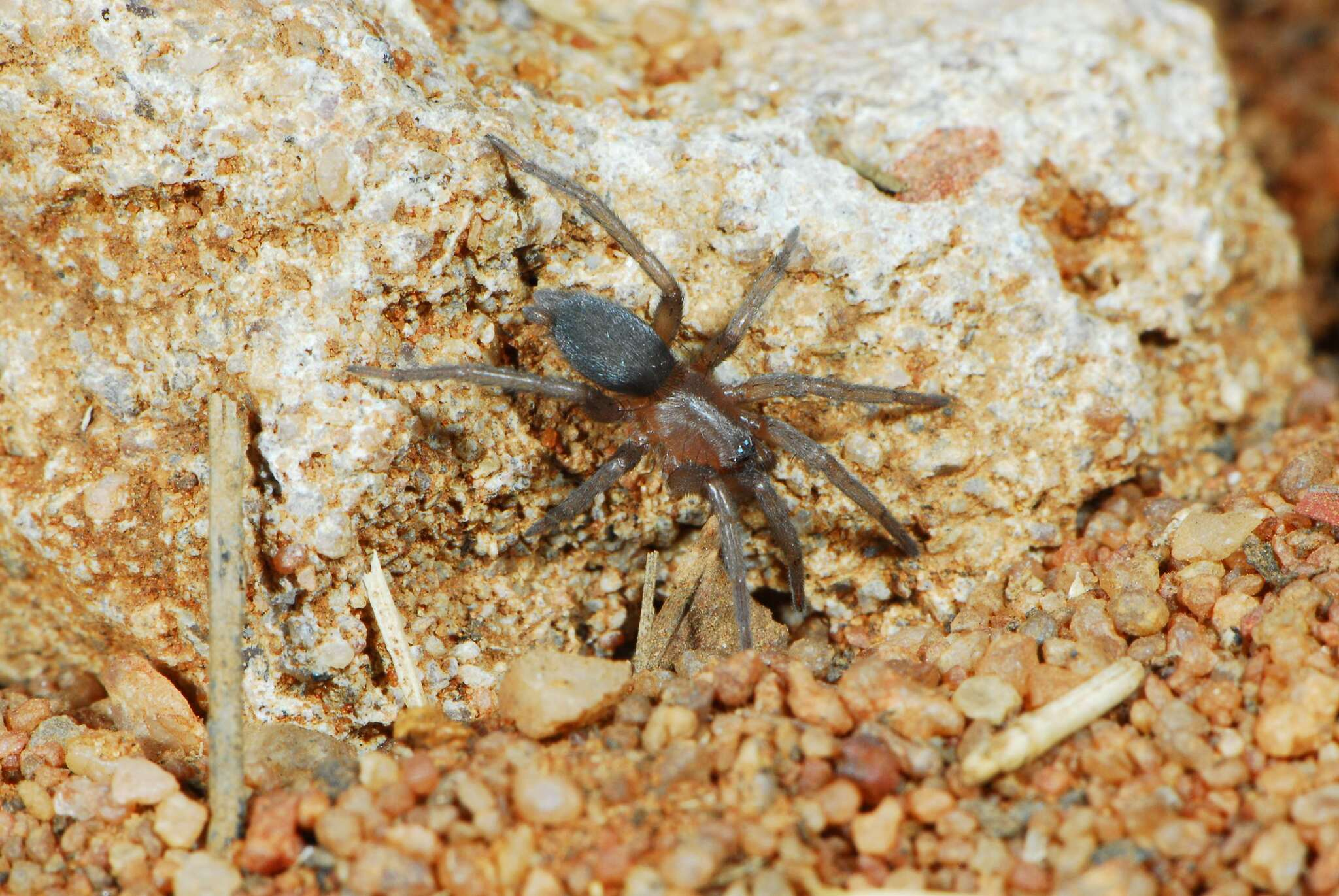
- Male

Scientific classification
- Kingdom: Animalia
- Phylum: Arthropoda
- Subphylum: Chelicerata
- Class: Arachnida
- Order: Araneae
- Infraorder: Araneomorphae
- Family: Prodidomidae
- Genus: Theuma
- Species: T. foveolata

Binomial name
- Theuma foveolata Tucker, 1923

= Theuma foveolata =

Zimbabwe Theuma Long Spinneret Ground Spider

Species of spider

Theuma foveolata is a species of spider in the family Prodidomidae. It is a southern African endemic commonly known as the Zimbabwe Theuma long spinneret ground spider.

== Distribution ==
Theuma foveolata occurs in two southern African countries, Zimbabwe and South Africa.

In South Africa, it is recorded from Free State, KwaZulu-Natal, Limpopo, and Northern Cape. Notable locations include Hluhluwe Nature Reserve, Kruger National Park, Rooipoort Nature Reserve, and Benfontein Game Reserve.

== Habitat and ecology ==
Theuma foveolata is a free-running ground dweller found in Grassland and Savanna biomes at altitudes ranging from 187 to 1,500 m above sea level.

== Conservation ==
Theuma foveolata is listed as Least Concern by the South African National Biodiversity Institute due to its wide geographical range. There are no significant threats to the species, and it is protected in Rooipoort Nature Reserve, Kruger National Park, Hluhluwe Nature Reserve, and Benfontein Game Reserve.

== Taxonomy ==
The species was originally described by Tucker in 1923 from Zimbabwe. It has not been revised and is known only from the female sex, though the male was collected but not yet described.
