= Theuma purcelli =

Purcell's Theuma Long Spinneret Ground Spider

Conservation status
- Least Concern (SANBI Red List)

Scientific classification
- Kingdom: Animalia
- Phylum: Arthropoda
- Subphylum: Chelicerata
- Class: Arachnida
- Order: Araneae
- Infraorder: Araneomorphae
- Family: Prodidomidae
- Genus: Theuma
- Species: T. purcelli

Binomial name
- Theuma purcelli Tucker, 1923

Species of spider

Theuma purcelli is a species of spider in the family Prodidomidae. It is a South African endemic commonly known as Purcell's Theuma long spinneret ground spider.

== Etymology ==
The species is named after William Frederick Purcell, a prominent arachnologist who made significant contributions to the study of South African spiders.

== Distribution ==
Theuma purcelli is known only from South Africa, where it is recorded from five provinces, Limpopo, Mpumalanga, Northern Cape, North West, and Western Cape.

Notable locations include Luvhondo Nature Reserve, Komatipoort, and Karoo National Park.

== Habitat and ecology ==
Theuma purcelli is a free-living ground dweller found in Nama Karoo, Savanna, and Succulent Karoo biomes. The species inhabits altitudes ranging from 163 to 1,341 m above sea level.

== Conservation ==
Theuma purcelli is listed as Least Concern by the South African National Biodiversity Institute. Although the species is presently known only from one sex, it has a wide geographical range and there are no significant threats. It is protected in Luvhondo Nature Reserve and Karoo National Park.

== Taxonomy ==
The species was originally described by Tucker in 1923 from Beaufort West in the Western Cape. It has not been revised and is known only from the female sex.
