= Theuma ababensis =

Botswana Theuma Long Spinnered Ground Spider

Conservation status
- Least Concern (SANBI Red List)

Scientific classification
- Kingdom: Animalia
- Phylum: Arthropoda
- Subphylum: Chelicerata
- Class: Arachnida
- Order: Araneae
- Infraorder: Araneomorphae
- Family: Prodidomidae
- Genus: Theuma
- Species: T. ababensis

Binomial name
- Theuma ababensis Tucker, 1923

Species of spider

Theuma ababensis is a species of spider in the family Prodidomidae. It is a southern African endemic commonly known as the Botswana Theuma long spinneret ground spider.

== Distribution ==
Theuma ababensis occurs in Botswana, Namibia, and South Africa. In South Africa, it is recorded from four provinces, Free State, Limpopo, Northern Cape, and Western Cape.

The species has a wide geographical range with notable locations including Edenville, Florisbad, Springbok Flats, Suffolk farm near Hopetown, and De Hoop Nature Reserve.

== Habitat and ecology ==
Theuma ababensis is a free-running ground dweller found in Fynbos, Nama Karoo, Grassland, and Savanna biomes. The species inhabits altitudes ranging from 266 to 1,500 m above sea level.

Like other members of its genus, this species is nocturnal and hides during the day under stones or debris on the ground. It is more commonly found in warm, dry regions.

== Conservation ==
Theuma ababensis is listed as Least Concern by the South African National Biodiversity Institute due to its wide geographical range in southern Africa. There are no significant threats to the species, and it is protected in De Hoop Nature Reserve.

== Taxonomy ==
The species was originally described by Tucker in 1923. It has not been revised and remains known only from the male sex.
