= Theuma tragardhi =

Umfolosi Theuma Long Spinneret Ground Spider

Conservation status
- Least Concern (SANBI Red List)

Scientific classification
- Kingdom: Animalia
- Phylum: Arthropoda
- Subphylum: Chelicerata
- Class: Arachnida
- Order: Araneae
- Infraorder: Araneomorphae
- Family: Prodidomidae
- Genus: Theuma
- Species: T. tragardhi

Binomial name
- Theuma tragardhi Lawrence, 1947

Species of spider

Theuma tragardhi is a species of spider in the family Prodidomidae. It is a South African endemic commonly known as the Umfolosi Theuma long spinneret ground spider.

== Distribution ==
Theuma tragardhi is known only from South Africa, where it is recorded from two provinces, Gauteng and KwaZulu-Natal.

Notable locations include Pretoria/Tshwane, Ndumo Game Reserve, and Umfolosi Nature Reserve.

== Habitat and ecology ==
Theuma tragardhi is a free-living ground dweller found in the Savanna biome. The species inhabits altitudes ranging from 47 to 1,303 m above sea level.

== Conservation ==
Theuma tragardhi is listed as Least Concern by the South African National Biodiversity Institute. Although known only from one sex, the species seems to have a wide range. It is threatened by habitat loss for infrastructure development and human settlement, especially in the Pretoria area, but is protected in Ndumo Game Reserve and Umfolosi Nature Reserve.

== Taxonomy ==
The species was originally described by Reginald Frederick Lawrence in 1947 from Umfolosi Drift in KwaZulu-Natal. It has not been revised and is known only from the male sex.
