= Purcelliana cederbergensis =

Scientific classification
- Kingdom: Animalia
- Phylum: Arthropoda
- Subphylum: Chelicerata
- Class: Arachnida
- Order: Araneae
- Infraorder: Araneomorphae
- Family: Prodidomidae
- Genus: Purcelliana
- Species: P. cederbergensis

Binomial name
- Purcelliana cederbergensis Rodrigues & Rheims, 2020

Species of spider

Purcelliana cederbergensis is a species of spider in the family Prodidomidae. It is endemic to South Africa.

== Distribution ==
Purcelliana cederbergensis is known only from the Western Cape province of South Africa, specifically from Wupperthal and Niewoudts Pass in the Cederberg.

== Habitat and ecology ==
The species is a free-living ground dweller sampled from pitfall traps in the Fynbos biome.

== Conservation ==
Purcelliana cederbergensis is listed as Data Deficient for taxonomic reasons. Too little is known about the location, distribution and threats of this species for an assessment to be made. More sampling is needed to collect the female and determine the species' range. There are no significant threats to the species, but it is presently protected in the Cederberg Wilderness Area.

== Taxonomy ==
The species was described by Rodrigues & Rheims in 2020 from Wupperthal in the Cederberg. It is known only from the male.
