= Austrodomus zuluensis =

Zululand Austrodomus Pale Ground Spider

Conservation status
- Least Concern (SANBI Red List)

Scientific classification
- Kingdom: Animalia
- Phylum: Arthropoda
- Subphylum: Chelicerata
- Class: Arachnida
- Order: Araneae
- Infraorder: Araneomorphae
- Family: Prodidomidae
- Genus: Austrodomus
- Species: A. zuluensis

Binomial name
- Austrodomus zuluensis Lawrence, 1947

Species of spider

Austrodomus zuluensis is a species of spider in the family Prodidomidae (formerly Gnaphosidae). It is found in Mozambique and South Africa and is commonly known as the Zululand Austrodomus pale ground spider.

== Etymology ==
The species name zuluensis refers to Zululand, the historical region in KwaZulu-Natal where the species was first described.

== Distribution ==
Austrodomus zuluensis occurs in Mozambique and South Africa. In South Africa, it is known from KwaZulu-Natal province.

== Habitat and ecology ==
The species is a free-running ground dweller. It has been sampled from Grassland, Desert, Savanna, and Nama Karoo biomes.

== Description ==
A. zuluensis is known only from the female.

== Conservation ==
Austrodomus zuluensis is listed as Least Concern by the South African National Biodiversity Institute due to its wide geographical range. The species is protected in the Ndumo Game Reserve.

== Taxonomy ==
The species was described by Lawrence in 1947 from Umfolosi Drift in KwaZulu-Natal. The genus was revised by Rodrigues & Rheims in 2020.
