= Namundra murphyi =

Scientific classification
- Kingdom: Animalia
- Phylum: Arthropoda
- Subphylum: Chelicerata
- Class: Arachnida
- Order: Araneae
- Infraorder: Araneomorphae
- Family: Prodidomidae
- Genus: Namundra
- Species: N. murphyi

Binomial name
- Namundra murphyi Haddad, 2022

Species of spider

Namundra murphyi is a species of spider in the family Prodidomidae. It is endemic to South Africa and is commonly known as Murphy's long-spinnered ground spider.

== Distribution ==
Namundra murphyi is known only from the Northern Cape province of South Africa, specifically from Richtersveld National Park at Akkedis Pass.

== Habitat and ecology ==
The sampled specimens were collected beneath large rocks in boulder fields on the west-facing slope of a mountain, approximately 100 m up from the valley floor, in Succulent Karoo vegetation.

== Conservation ==
Namundra murphyi is listed as Data Deficient for taxonomic reasons. The species is known only from one sex and the type locality. More sampling is needed to collect the male and to determine the species' range. The species is protected in the Richtersveld National Park.

== Taxonomy ==
The species was described by Charles R. Haddad in 2022 from the Northern Cape. It is known only from the female.
