= Theuma schreineri =

Hanover Theuma Long Spinneret Ground Spider

Conservation status
- Least Concern (SANBI Red List)

Scientific classification
- Kingdom: Animalia
- Phylum: Arthropoda
- Subphylum: Chelicerata
- Class: Arachnida
- Order: Araneae
- Infraorder: Araneomorphae
- Family: Prodidomidae
- Genus: Theuma
- Species: T. schreineri

Binomial name
- Theuma schreineri Purcell, 1907

Species of spider

Theuma schreineri is a species of spider in the family Prodidomidae. It is a southern African endemic commonly known as the Hanover Theuma long spinneret ground spider.

== Distribution ==
Theuma schreineri occurs in Lesotho and South Africa. In South Africa, it is recorded from five provinces, Eastern Cape, Free State, Northern Cape, North West, and Western Cape.

Notable locations include Jeffrey's Bay, Erfenis Dam Nature Reserve, Hanover, Vryburg, De Hoop Nature Reserve, and Cederberg Wilderness Area.

== Habitat and ecology ==
Theuma schreineri is a free-living ground dweller found in Fynbos, Nama Karoo, Grassland, and Savanna biomes. The species inhabits altitudes ranging from 266 to 1,529 m above sea level.

== Conservation ==
Theuma schreineri is listed as Least Concern by the South African National Biodiversity Institute due to its wide distribution range. There are no significant threats to the species, and it is protected in Erfenis Dam Nature Reserve, De Hoop Nature Reserve, and the Cederberg Wilderness Area.

== Taxonomy ==
The species was originally described by William Frederick Purcell in 1907 from Hanover in the Northern Cape. It has not been revised but is known from both sexes.
