= Brasilomma =

Scientific classification
- Kingdom: Animalia
- Phylum: Arthropoda
- Subphylum: Chelicerata
- Class: Arachnida
- Order: Araneae
- Infraorder: Araneomorphae
- Family: Prodidomidae
- Genus: Brasilomma; Brescovit, Ferreira & Rheims, 2012
- Species: B. enigmatica

Binomial name
- Brasilomma enigmatica Brescovit, Ferreira & Rheims, 2012

Genus of spiders

Brasilomma is a monotypic genus of Brazilian long-spinneret ground spiders containing the single species, Brasilomma enigmatica. It was first described by Antônio Domingos Brescovit in 2012, and is only found in Brazil.
