= Theuma mutica =

Scientific classification
- Kingdom: Animalia
- Phylum: Arthropoda
- Subphylum: Chelicerata
- Class: Arachnida
- Order: Araneae
- Infraorder: Araneomorphae
- Family: Prodidomidae
- Genus: Theuma
- Species: T. mutica

Binomial name
- Theuma mutica Purcell, 1907

Species of spider

Theuma mutica is a species of spider in the family Prodidomidae. It is a Western Cape endemic.

== Distribution ==
Theuma mutica is known only from South Africa, specifically from the type locality Kogsmans Kloof in the Western Cape.

== Habitat and ecology ==
Theuma mutica is a free-living ground dweller found in the Fynbos biome at an altitude of 718 m above sea level.

== Conservation ==
Theuma mutica is listed as Data Deficient for Taxonomic reasons. The status of the species remains obscure, and more sampling is needed to collect the male and determine the species range.

== Taxonomy ==
The species was originally described by William Frederick Purcell in 1907 from Kogsmans Kloof. It has not been revised and is known only from the female sex.
