= Purcelliana problematica =

Scientific classification
- Kingdom: Animalia
- Phylum: Arthropoda
- Subphylum: Chelicerata
- Class: Arachnida
- Order: Araneae
- Infraorder: Araneomorphae
- Family: Prodidomidae
- Genus: Purcelliana
- Species: P. problematica

Binomial name
- Purcelliana problematica Cooke, 1964

Synonyms
- Prodidomus scaber Purcell, 1904 (misidentification)

Species of spider

Purcelliana problematica is a species of spider in the family Prodidomidae. It is endemic to South Africa.

== Distribution ==
Purcelliana problematica is known only from the Western Cape province of South Africa. The species ranges in altitude from 613 to 614 m above sea level. It has been recorded from Prince Albert and Anysberg Nature Reserve.

== Habitat and ecology ==
The species is a free-running ground dweller sampled from the Nama Karoo biome.

== Conservation ==
Purcelliana problematica is listed as Data Deficient for taxonomic reasons. The species is under-sampled and expected to be found in more localities. More sampling is needed to collect the female and determine the species' range. There are no known threats, and it is protected in the Anysberg Nature Reserve.

== Taxonomy ==
The species was described by J.A.L. Cooke in 1964 from Prince Albert. It was originally misidentified by Purcell in 1904 as Prodidomus scaber. The species was revised by Rodrigues & Rheims in 2020 and is known only from the male.
