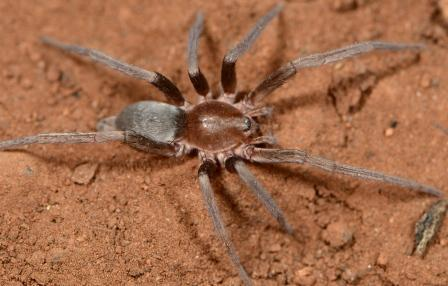
- Male
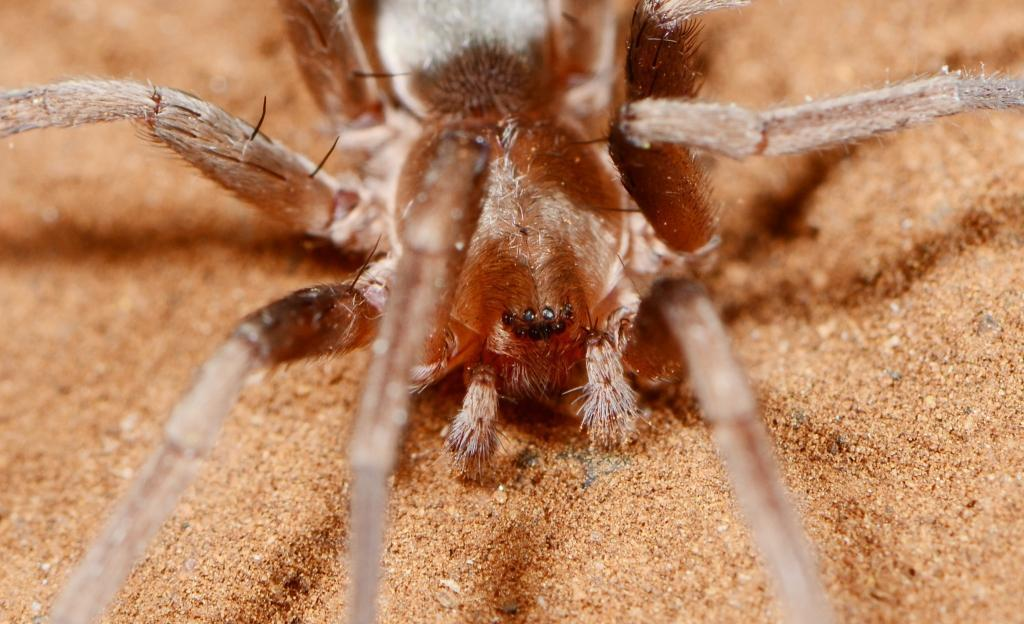
- Male

Scientific classification
- Kingdom: Animalia
- Phylum: Arthropoda
- Subphylum: Chelicerata
- Class: Arachnida
- Order: Araneae
- Infraorder: Araneomorphae
- Family: Prodidomidae
- Genus: Theuma
- Species: T. elucubrata

Binomial name
- Theuma elucubrata Tucker, 1923

= Theuma elucubata =

Gauteng Theuma Long Spinnered Ground Spider

Species of spider

Theuma elucubrata is a species of spider in the family Prodidomidae. It is a South African endemic commonly known as the Gauteng Theuma long spinnered ground spider.

== Distribution ==
Theuma elucubrata is known only from South Africa, where it is recorded from Gauteng, KwaZulu-Natal, Limpopo, and North West.

Notable locations include Suikerbosrand Nature Reserve, Walter Sisulu National Botanical Garden, Luvhondo Nature Reserve, and Pilanesberg Nature Reserve.

== Habitat and ecology ==
Theuma elucubrata is a free-running ground dweller found in Grassland and Savanna biomes. The species inhabits altitudes ranging from 1,171 to 1,758 m above sea level.

== Conservation ==
Theuma elucubrata is listed as Least Concern by the South African National Biodiversity Institute. Although the species is presently known only from one sex, it has a wide geographical range and there are no significant threats. It is protected in Ruimsig Butterfly Reserve, Suikerbosrand Nature Reserve, Luvhondo Nature Reserve, and Pilanesberg Nature Reserve.

== Taxonomy ==
The species was originally described by Tucker in 1923 from Florida in Gauteng. It has not been revised and is known only from the female sex, though the male was collected but remains undescribed.
