= Namundra =

Scientific classification
- Kingdom: Animalia
- Phylum: Arthropoda
- Subphylum: Chelicerata
- Class: Arachnida
- Order: Araneae
- Infraorder: Araneomorphae
- Family: Prodidomidae
- Genus: Namundra; Platnick & Bird, 2007

Species
- 5, see text

Genus of spiders

Namundra is a genus of African long-spinneret ground spiders that was first described by Norman I. Platnick & T. L. Bird in 2007.

== Description ==
Members of the genus Namundra are medium-sized spiders with a total length of approximately 2–5 mm. The carapace is rounded, narrowed in front to less than half its maximum width, with rebordered lateral margins and a reflexed posterior margin. The surface is coated with long, recumbent setae without tubercles.

Eight subequal eyes are present in two rows. The abdominal dorsum lacks an anterior scutum in males, and the cuticle has long, recumbent setae. Six spinnerets are present, with anterior laterals greatly elongated, equal to roughly half of total abdominal length and greatly advanced anteriorly.

== Species ==
As of September 2025 it contains five species, found only in Africa:

- Namundra brandberg Platnick & Bird, 2007 – Namibia
- Namundra griffinae Platnick & Bird, 2007 – Namibia (type species)
- Namundra kleynjansi Platnick & Bird, 2007 – Namibia
- Namundra leechi Platnick & Bird, 2007 – Angola
- Namundra murphyi Haddad, 2022 – South Africa
