= Indiani =

Scientific classification
- Kingdom: Animalia
- Phylum: Arthropoda
- Subphylum: Chelicerata
- Class: Arachnida
- Order: Araneae
- Infraorder: Araneomorphae
- Family: Gnaphosidae
- Genus: Indiani; Rodrigues, Cizauskas & Lemos, 2020
- Species: I. gaspar

Binomial name
- Indiani gaspar Rodrigues, Cizauskas & Lemos, 2020

Genus of spiders

Indiani is a monotypic genus of South American long-spinneret ground spiders containing the single species, Indiani gaspar. It was first described by B. V. B. Rodrigues, I. Cizauskas and Y. Lemos in 2020, and placed into the Prodidominae subfamily. As of 2021 it has only been found in Brazil.
