= Purcelliana =

Scientific classification
- Kingdom: Animalia
- Phylum: Arthropoda
- Subphylum: Chelicerata
- Class: Arachnida
- Order: Araneae
- Infraorder: Araneomorphae
- Family: Prodidomidae
- Genus: Purcelliana; Cooke, 1964

Genus of spiders

Purcelliana is a genus of South African long-spinneret ground spiders. It was first described by J. A. L. Cooke in 1964, and is only found in South Africa and Namibia.

== Description ==
Purcelliana are spiders with a total length of males 1.68–3.3 mm and females 1.92–3.76 mm. Carapace as wide as long, slightly narrow at cephalic region with fovea absent. Eight eyes with posterior eye row strongly procurved and anterior eye row approximately straight. Posterior median eyes and posterior lateral eyes irregular while anterior median eyes are dark.

Chelicerae relatively small without boss or teeth but with long fang. Dorsal surface of paturon with clavate setae erect, resembling spines. Endites anteriorly convergent with few hairs on internal margin. Labium approximately as wide as long. Sternum longer than wide with anterior margin straight, rebordered anteriorly and laterally. Posterior region strongly protruding between coxae IV with numerous long and erect setae.

Abdomen oval, longer than wide with dorsum without curved setae anteriorly. Six spinnerets present with anterior lateral spinnerets as long as wide and almost contiguous. Leg formula 1423 without spines except the ventral tarsus with clustered clavate setae resembling spines. Two smooth claws with dense claw tufts of tenent setae inserted in well-delimited plate.

== Species ==
As of January 2026, this genus includes four species:

- Purcelliana cederbergensis Rodrigues & Rheims, 2020 – South Africa
- Purcelliana kamaseb Rodrigues & Rheims, 2020 – Namibia
- Purcelliana khabus Rodrigues & Rheims, 2020 – Namibia
- Purcelliana problematica Cooke, 1964 – South Africa
