= Theuma pusilla =

Scientific classification
- Kingdom: Animalia
- Phylum: Arthropoda
- Subphylum: Chelicerata
- Class: Arachnida
- Order: Araneae
- Infraorder: Araneomorphae
- Family: Prodidomidae
- Genus: Theuma
- Species: T. pusilla

Binomial name
- Theuma pusilla Purcell, 1908

Species of spider

Theuma pusilla is a species of spider in the family Prodidomidae. It is a southern African endemic.

== Distribution ==
Theuma pusilla occurs in Namibia and South Africa. In South Africa, it is known only from the type locality Kamaggas in the Northern Cape.

== Habitat and ecology ==
Theuma pusilla is a free-running ground dweller found in the Succulent Karoo biome at an altitude of 231 m above sea level.

== Conservation ==
Theuma pusilla is listed as Data Deficient for Taxonomic reasons. The status of the species remains obscure, and although it is also known from Namibia, more sampling is needed to collect the male and determine the species range.

== Taxonomy ==
The species was originally described by William Frederick Purcell in 1908 from Kamaggas in the Northern Cape. It has not been revised and is known only from the female sex.
