= Lygromma anops =

Scientific classification
- Kingdom: Animalia
- Phylum: Arthropoda
- Subphylum: Chelicerata
- Class: Arachnida
- Order: Araneae
- Infraorder: Araneomorphae
- Family: Prodidomidae
- Genus: Lygromma
- Species: L. anops

Binomial name
- Lygromma anops Peck & Shear, 1987

Species of spider

Lygromma anops is one of only three known eyeless spiders in the superfamily Gnaphosoidea, and one of only two known troglobites (cave species). It is found in lava caves on Isla Santa Cruz, Galápagos.

It is possible that L. anops, like many inhabitants of lava caves, colonizes new caves through interconnecting cracks and crevices, and that these small spaces are in reality its main habitat.

Males reach a body length of about 3.4 mm.

L. anops seems to be closely related with L. senoculatum, L. valencianum and L. huberti from Venezuela.

Lygromma gertschi, a blind, cave-inhabiting species from Jamaica is not a close relative of L. anops.
