= Lygromma =

Scientific classification
- Kingdom: Animalia
- Phylum: Arthropoda
- Subphylum: Chelicerata
- Class: Arachnida
- Order: Araneae
- Infraorder: Araneomorphae
- Family: Prodidomidae
- Genus: Lygromma; Simon, 1893

Species
- See text.

Genus of spiders

Lygromma is a spider genus of Central and South America. There are species with eight, six (e.g. L. senoculatum, L. valencianum) and no eyes. The eyeless L. anops is endemic to the Galapagos, while the distantly related blind L. gertschi is found only on Jamaica.

The Mexican genera Tivodrassus and Tricongius have been suggested as sister groups of Lygromma.

Species can reach a body length from about 2 to 4.6 mm.

== Species ==
As of August 2022, the genus contains 19 species:

- Lygromma anops Peck & Shear, 1987 — Galapagos Islands
- Lygromma chamberlini Gertsch, 1941 — Panama, Colombia, Cuba
- Lygromma domingo Platnick & Shadab, 1981 — Ecuador
- Lygromma dybasi Platnick & Shadab, 1976 — Costa Rica, Panama
- Lygromma gasnieri Brescovit & Höfer, 1993 — Brazil
- Lygromma gertschi Platnick & Shadab, 1976 — Jamaica
- Lygromma huberti Platnick & Shadab, 1976 — Venezuela, Brazil
- Lygromma kochalkai Platnick & Shadab, 1976 — Colombia
- Lygromma nicolae Víquez, 2020 – Costa Rica
- Lygromma peckorum Platnick & Shadab, 1976 — Colombia
- Lygromma peruvianum Platnick & Shadab, 1976 — Peru
- Lygromma quindio Platnick & Shadab, 1976 — Colombia
- Lygromma senoculatum Simon, 1893 — Venezuela
- Lygromma simoni (Berland, 1913) — Ecuador
- Lygromma taruma Brescovit & Bonaldo, 1998 — Brazil
- Lygromma tuxtla Platnick, 1978 — Mexico
- Lygromma valencianum Simon, 1893 — Venezuela
- Lygromma volcan Platnick & Shadab, 1981 — Panama
- Lygromma wygodzinskyi Platnick, 1978 — Colombia
