= Prodidomus flavipes =

Scientific classification
- Kingdom: Animalia
- Phylum: Arthropoda
- Subphylum: Chelicerata
- Class: Arachnida
- Order: Araneae
- Infraorder: Araneomorphae
- Family: Prodidomidae
- Genus: Prodidomus
- Species: P. flavipes

Binomial name
- Prodidomus flavipes Lawrence, 1952

Species of spider

Prodidomus flavipes is a species of spider in the family Prodidomidae. It is endemic to South Africa.

== Distribution ==
Prodidomus flavipes is found only in KwaZulu-Natal province, South Africa. The species has a range in altitude from 13 to 646 m above sea level. Recorded locations include Ingwavuma, iSimangaliso Wetland Park at Cape Vidal, Ndumo Game Reserve, and Tembe Elephant Park.

== Habitat and ecology ==
The species is a free-running ground dweller found in the Savanna biome.

== Description ==
Prodidomus flavipes belongs to the family Prodidomidae, which are small free-running ground spiders. The species is known only from the female specimen. With a total length of 1.52 mm, it is a very small spider. The cephalothorax width is 1.14 mm.

Prodidomus flavipes is known only from the female, with a total length of 1.52 mm and cephalothorax width of 1.14 mm.

The carapace is yellow-brown with a few faint radiating infuscations and a darker border, bearing some scattered inwards-pointing dark hairs. The posterior median indentation is rather deep, revealing more of the lorum than is usual. The abdomen is cream with a slight purplish tinge, particularly along the midline and posteriorly, where there are also a few narrow, pale indistinct chevrons.

== Conservation ==
Prodidomus flavipes is listed as Data Deficient for taxonomic reasons. More sampling is needed to collect the male and determine the species' range. Threats to the species are unknown, but it is protected in Ndumo Game Reserve and Tembe Elephant Park.

== Etymology ==
The specific name is Latin meaning "yellow feet".

== Taxonomy ==
The species was described by R.F. Lawrence in 1952 from Ingwavuma in KwaZulu-Natal. It has not been revised since its original description and is known only from the female.
