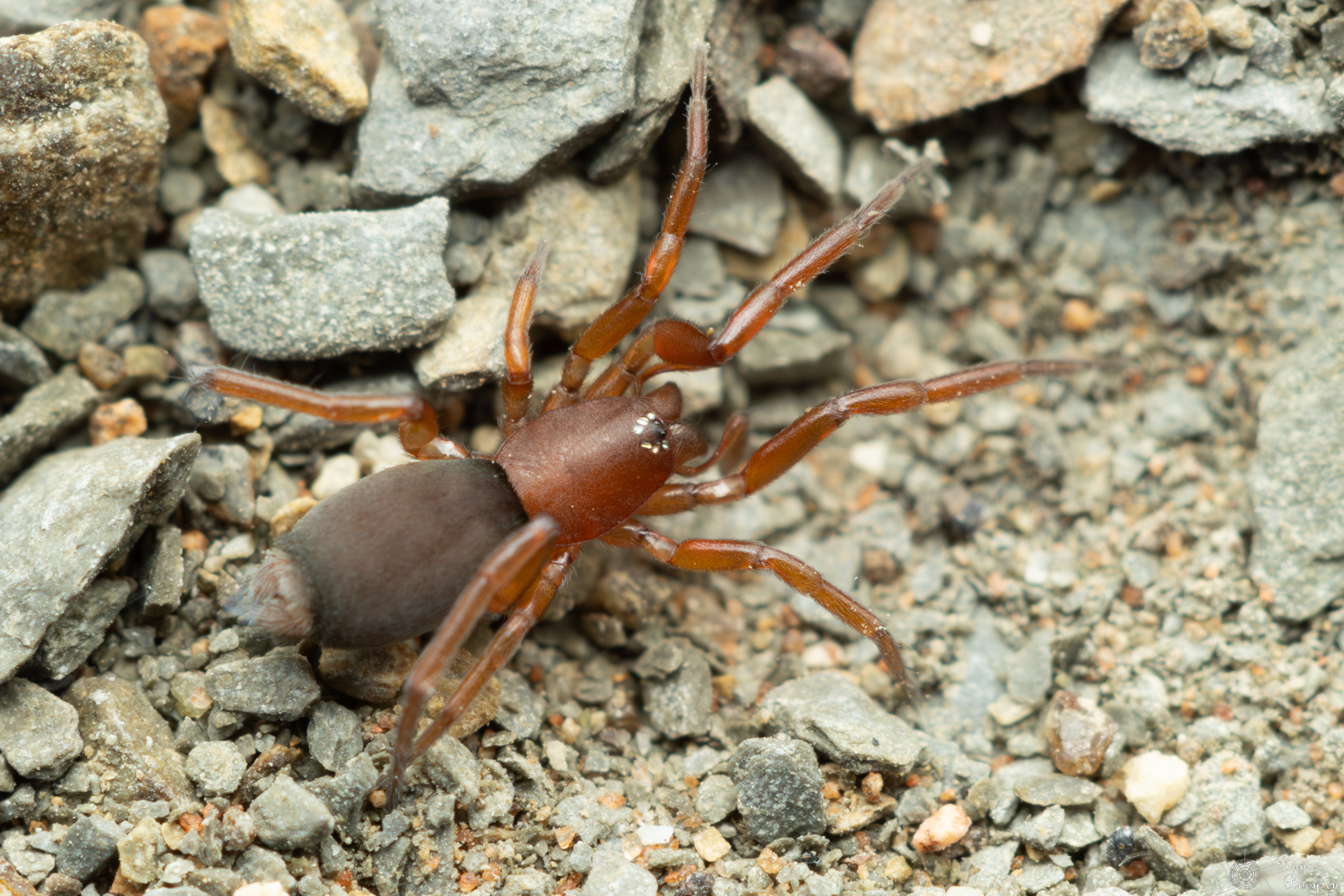
- female
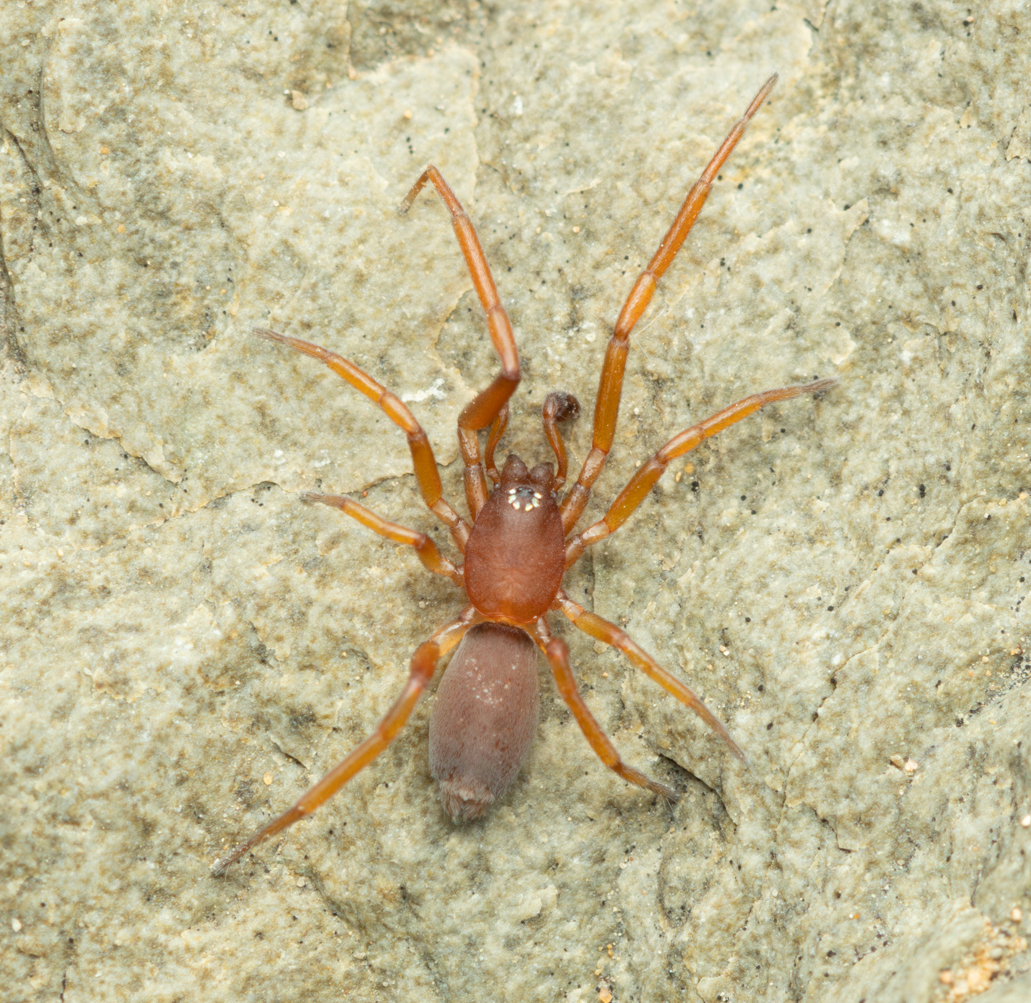
- male

Scientific classification
- Kingdom: Animalia
- Phylum: Arthropoda
- Subphylum: Chelicerata
- Class: Arachnida
- Order: Araneae
- Infraorder: Araneomorphae
- Family: Prodidomidae
- Genus: Prodidomus
- Species: P. purpurascens

Binomial name
- Prodidomus purpurascens Purcell, 1904

= Prodidomus purpurascens =

Table Mountain Prodidomus Pale Ground Spider

Species of spider

Prodidomus purpurascens is a species of spider in the family Prodidomidae. It is endemic to South Africa and is commonly known as the Table Mountain Prodidomus pale ground spider.

== Distribution ==
Prodidomus purpurascens is found in the South African provinces Northern Cape and Western Cape. The species ranges in altitude from 5 to 1,212 m above sea level. Locations in the Northern Cape include Tswalu Kalahari Reserve, Steinkopf, and Augrabies National Park. Western Cape localities include Black Pearls Core in the Swartland, Beaufort West, Malmesbury, Anysberg Nature Reserve, Stompneus, Table Mountain National Park at Devils Peak, Matjiesfontein, and Karoo National Park.

== Habitat and ecology ==
The species is a free-running ground dweller sampled from the Fynbos, Nama Karoo, and Succulent Karoo biomes.

== Conservation ==
Prodidomus purpurascens is listed as Least Concern due to its wide geographical range. Threats to the species are unknown, but it is protected in several areas including Tswalu Kalahari Reserve, Augrabies National Park, Anysberg Nature Reserve, Table Mountain National Park, and Karoo National Park.

== Taxonomy ==
The species was originally described by W.F. Purcell in 1904 from Devils Peak in Table Mountain National Park. The male was first described by Cooke in 1964. The species has not been revised since Cooke's work and is known from both sexes.
