= Prodidomus simoni =

Scientific classification
- Kingdom: Animalia
- Phylum: Arthropoda
- Subphylum: Chelicerata
- Class: Arachnida
- Order: Araneae
- Infraorder: Araneomorphae
- Family: Prodidomidae
- Genus: Prodidomus
- Species: P. simoni

Binomial name
- Prodidomus simoni Dalmas, 1919

Species of spider

Prodidomus simoni is a species of spider in the family Prodidomidae. It is endemic to South Africa.

== Distribution ==
Prodidomus simoni is known only from Limpopo province, specifically from Makapans Cave. The species is found at an altitude of 1,416 m above sea level.

== Habitat and ecology ==
The species is a free-running ground dweller sampled from the Savanna biome.

== Conservation ==
Prodidomus simoni is listed as Data Deficient for taxonomic reasons. The status of the species remains obscure, and more sampling is needed to collect the female and to determine the species' range.

== Taxonomy ==
The species was described by R. de Dalmas in 1919 with the type locality given only as Transvaal, Makapan. It has not been revised since its original description and is known only from the male.
