= Prodidomus capensis =

Cape Prodidomus Pale Ground Spider

Conservation status
- Least Concern (SANBI Red List)

Scientific classification
- Kingdom: Animalia
- Phylum: Arthropoda
- Subphylum: Chelicerata
- Class: Arachnida
- Order: Araneae
- Infraorder: Araneomorphae
- Family: Prodidomidae
- Genus: Prodidomus
- Species: P. capensis

Binomial name
- Prodidomus capensis Purcell, 1904

Species of spider

Prodidomus capensis is a species of spider in the family Prodidomidae. It is endemic to South Africa and is commonly known as the Cape Prodidomus pale ground spider.

== Distribution ==
Prodidomus capensis is found across three South African provinces: Eastern Cape, Limpopo, and Western Cape. The species has a wide distribution, ranging in altitude from 7 to 1,146 m above sea level. Notable locations include Dunbrody in the Eastern Cape; several sites in Limpopo including Vhembe Biosphere Nwanedi Game Reserve, Vhembe Biosphere Gondeni, Little Leigh in the Western Soutpansberg, and Blouberg Nature Reserve; and numerous sites in the Western Cape including De Hoop Nature Reserve, Clanwilliam, various locations in the Cederberg Wilderness Area, Cape Town, and Bontebok National Park.

== Habitat and ecology ==
The species is a free-running ground dweller found in the Fynbos, Thicket, and Savanna biomes.

== Description ==
Prodidomus capensis is known only from the female. The species is rufescent in coloration, with legs paler and more yellowish than the carapace. The abdomen is very pale yellowish, with the upper surface tinted with purple, especially posteriorly. Total trunk length is 6.8 mm.

== Conservation ==
Prodidomus capensis is listed as Least Concern due to its wide geographical range despite being known only from one sex. There are no significant threats to the species, and it is protected in several areas including Blouberg Nature Reserve, Nwanedi Game Reserve, De Hoop Nature Reserve, Cederberg Wilderness Area, and Bontebok National Park.

== Taxonomy ==
The species was originally described by W.F. Purcell in 1904 from Cape Town. It has not been revised since its original description and is known only from the female.
