= Myandra =

Scientific classification
- Kingdom: Animalia
- Phylum: Arthropoda
- Subphylum: Chelicerata
- Class: Arachnida
- Order: Araneae
- Infraorder: Araneomorphae
- Family: Prodidomidae
- Genus: Myandra; Simon, 1887

Type species
- M. cambridgei Simon, 1887

Species
- 4, see text

Genus of spiders

Myandra is a genus of South Pacific ground spiders that was first described by Eugène Louis Simon in 1887.

== Species ==
As of June 2019 it contains four species, found only in Australia:

- Myandra bicincta Simon, 1908 – Australia
- Myandra cambridgei Simon, 1887 (type) – Australia
- Myandra myall Platnick & Baehr, 2006 – Australia (Queensland to Tasmania)
- Myandra tinline Platnick & Baehr, 2006 – Southern Australia
