= Theumella =

Scientific classification
- Kingdom: Animalia
- Phylum: Arthropoda
- Subphylum: Chelicerata
- Class: Arachnida
- Order: Araneae
- Infraorder: Araneomorphae
- Family: Prodidomidae
- Genus: Theumella; Strand, 1906

Type species
- T. typica Strand, 1906

Species
- T. penicillata Strand, 1906 – Ethiopia; T. typica Strand, 1906 – Ethiopia

Genus of spiders

Theumella is a genus of Ethiopian ground spiders that was first described by Embrik Strand in 1906. As of June 2019 it contains only two species, found only in Ethiopia: T. penicillata and T. typica. Originally placed with the long-spinneret ground spiders, it was transferred to the ground spiders in 2018.
