= Myandra bicincta =

Scientific classification
- Kingdom: Animalia
- Phylum: Arthropoda
- Subphylum: Chelicerata
- Class: Arachnida
- Order: Araneae
- Infraorder: Araneomorphae
- Family: Prodidomidae
- Genus: Myandra
- Species: M. bicincta

Binomial name
- Myandra bicincta Simon, 1908

Species of spider

Myandra bicincta is a species of spider within the family Gnaphosidae. The species is found throughout all of Australia's states, including Tasmania. The holotype of the species is a male collected from Myall Lakes National Park in New South Wales. The species was first recorded from Boyanup in Western Australia, while later specimens were recorded near Launceston in Tasmania.
