= Eleleis crinita =

Scientific classification
- Kingdom: Animalia
- Phylum: Arthropoda
- Subphylum: Chelicerata
- Class: Arachnida
- Order: Araneae
- Infraorder: Araneomorphae
- Family: Prodidomidae
- Genus: Eleleis
- Species: E. crinita

Binomial name
- Eleleis crinita Simon, 1893

Species of spider

Eleleis crinita is a species of spider in the family Prodidomidae. It is endemic to South Africa.

== Distribution ==
Eleleis crinita is known only from South Africa, with the type locality given only as "Cape Colony" with no exact locality specified.

== Habitat and ecology ==
The species is a free-running ground dweller. Members of the genus Eleleis are frequently found under rocks in association with ants.

== Conservation ==
Eleleis crinita is listed as Data Deficient for taxonomic reasons. Too little is known about the location, habitat and threats of this species for an assessment to be made. The placement of the species is also problematic, and more sampling is needed.

== Taxonomy ==
The species was originally described by Eugène Simon in 1893 with the type locality given as Cape Bonae Spei. It was redescribed by Rodrigues & Rheims in 2020. The species is known only from the female.
