= Oltacloea =

Scientific classification
- Kingdom: Animalia
- Phylum: Arthropoda
- Subphylum: Chelicerata
- Class: Arachnida
- Order: Araneae
- Infraorder: Araneomorphae
- Family: Prodidomidae
- Genus: Oltacloea; Mello-Leitão, 1940

Type species
- O. mutilata Mello-Leitão, 1940

Species
- O. beltraoae Brescovit & Ramos, 2003 – Brazil; O. mutilata Mello-Leitão, 1940 – Argentina; O. ribaslangei Bonaldo & Brescovit, 1997 – Brazil

Genus of spiders

Oltacloea is a genus of South American ground spiders that was first described by Cândido Firmino de Mello-Leitão in 1940. As of June 2019 it contains only three species, found only in Argentina and Brazil: O. beltraoae, O. mutilata, and O. ribaslangei. Originally placed with the long-spinneret ground spiders, it was transferred to the ground spiders in 2018.
