= Eleleis haddadi =

Scientific classification
- Kingdom: Animalia
- Phylum: Arthropoda
- Subphylum: Chelicerata
- Class: Arachnida
- Order: Araneae
- Infraorder: Araneomorphae
- Family: Prodidomidae
- Genus: Eleleis
- Species: E. haddadi

Binomial name
- Eleleis haddadi Rodrigues & Rheims, 2020

Species of spider

Eleleis haddadi is a species of spider in the family Prodidomidae. It is endemic to South Africa.

== Etymology ==
The species is named after Charles R. Haddad, a South African arachnologist who has made significant contributions to the study of southern African spiders.

== Distribution ==
Eleleis haddadi is known only from the Free State province of South Africa, specifically from the Mpetsane Conservation Estate near Clocolan.

== Habitat and ecology ==
The species is a free-running ground dweller. Like other members of the genus, it is likely found under rocks in association with ants.

== Conservation ==
Eleleis haddadi is listed as Data Deficient for taxonomic reasons. The species is known only from the type locality, and more sampling is needed to collect the male and determine the species' range. It is protected at the Mpetsane Conservation Estate, and no known threats have been identified.

== Taxonomy ==
The species was described by Rodrigues & Rheims in 2020 from the Mpetsane Conservation Estate. It is known only from the female.
