= Katumbea =

Scientific classification
- Kingdom: Animalia
- Phylum: Arthropoda
- Subphylum: Chelicerata
- Class: Arachnida
- Order: Araneae
- Infraorder: Araneomorphae
- Family: Prodidomidae
- Genus: Katumbea; Cooke, 1964
- Species: K. oxoniensis

Binomial name
- Katumbea oxoniensis Cooke, 1964

Genus of spiders

Katumbea is a monotypic genus of Tanzanian ground spiders containing the single species, Katumbea oxoniensis. It was first described by J. A. L. Cooke in 1964, and is only found in Tanzania.
