= Eleleis leleupi =

Scientific classification
- Kingdom: Animalia
- Phylum: Arthropoda
- Subphylum: Chelicerata
- Class: Arachnida
- Order: Araneae
- Infraorder: Araneomorphae
- Family: Prodidomidae
- Genus: Eleleis
- Species: E. leleupi

Binomial name
- Eleleis leleupi Rodrigues & Rheims, 2020

Species of spider

Eleleis leleupi is a species of spider in the family Prodidomidae. It is endemic to South Africa.

== Distribution ==
Eleleis leleupi is known only from the Western Cape province of South Africa, specifically from Clanwilliam in the Cederberg.

== Habitat and ecology ==
The species is a free-running ground dweller sampled from the Fynbos biome. Like other members of the genus, it is likely found under rocks in association with ants.

== Conservation ==
Eleleis leleupi is listed as Data Deficient for taxonomic reasons. More sampling is needed to collect the female and determine the species' range. Threats are unknown, but the species is protected in the Cederberg Wilderness Area.

== Taxonomy ==
The species was described by Rodrigues & Rheims in 2020 from Clanwilliam. It is known only from the male.
