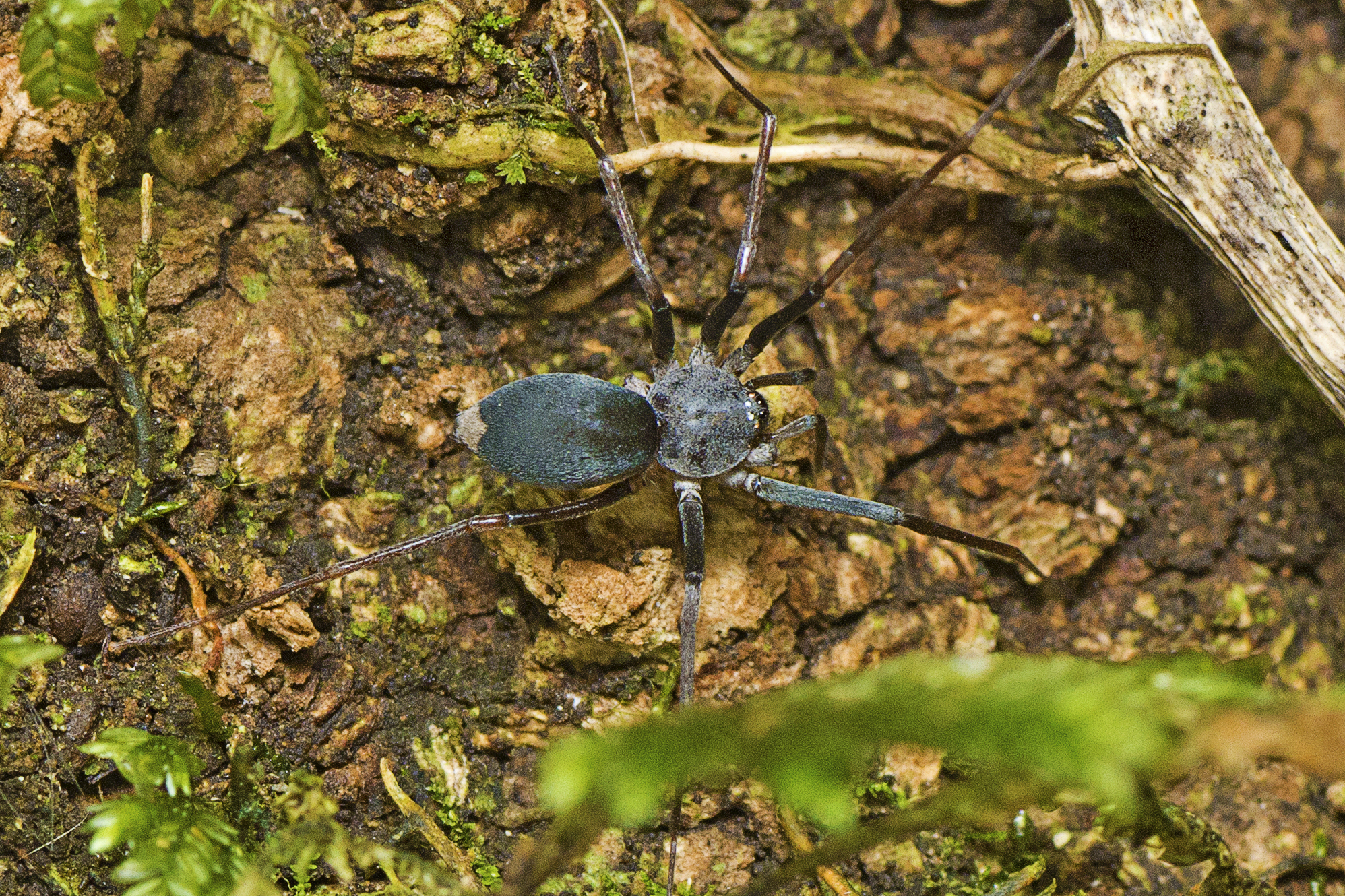
- Molycria burwelli

Scientific classification
- Kingdom: Animalia
- Phylum: Arthropoda
- Subphylum: Chelicerata
- Class: Arachnida
- Order: Araneae
- Infraorder: Araneomorphae
- Family: Prodidomidae
- Genus: Molycria; Simon, 1887

Type species
- M. mammosa (O. Pickard-Cambridge, 1874)

Species
- 36, see text

Synonyms
- Honunius Simon, 1908

= Molycria =

Genus of spiders

Molycria is a genus of Australian ground spiders that was first described by Eugène Louis Simon in 1887.

== Species ==
As of June 2019 it contains thirty-six species, found in the Northern Territory, Western Australia, South Australia, New South Wales, and Queensland:

- Molycria amphi Platnick & Baehr, 2006 – Australia (Queensland)
- Molycria broadwater Platnick & Baehr, 2006 – Australia (Queensland, New South Wales)
- Molycria bulburin Platnick & Baehr, 2006 – Australia (Queensland)
- Molycria bundjalung Platnick & Baehr, 2006 – Australia (New South Wales)
- Molycria burwelli Platnick & Baehr, 2006 – Australia (Queensland)
- Molycria canonba Platnick & Baehr, 2006 – Australia (Queensland, New South Wales)
- Molycria cleveland Platnick & Baehr, 2006 – Australia (Queensland)
- Molycria cooki Platnick & Baehr, 2006 – Australia (Queensland)
- Molycria dalby Platnick & Baehr, 2006 – Australia (Queensland, New South Wales)
- Molycria daviesae Platnick & Baehr, 2006 – Australia (Queensland)
- Molycria dawson Platnick & Baehr, 2006 – Australia (Queensland)
- Molycria drummond Platnick & Baehr, 2006 – Australia (Queensland)
- Molycria goanna Platnick & Baehr, 2006 – Australia (Queensland, New South Wales)
- Molycria grayi Platnick & Baehr, 2006 – Australia (Queensland, New South Wales, Lord Howe Is.)
- Molycria isla Platnick & Baehr, 2006 – Australia (Queensland)
- Molycria kaputar Platnick & Baehr, 2006 – Australia (New South Wales)
- Molycria mammosa (O. Pickard-Cambridge, 1874) (type) – Australia (New South Wales, Capital Territory)
- Molycria mcleani Platnick & Baehr, 2006 – Australia (Queensland)
- Molycria milledgei Platnick & Baehr, 2006 – Australia (New South Wales)
- Molycria moffatt Platnick & Baehr, 2006 – Australia (Queensland)
- Molycria monteithi Platnick & Baehr, 2006 – Australia (Queensland)
- Molycria moranbah Platnick & Baehr, 2006 – Australia (Queensland)
- Molycria nipping Platnick & Baehr, 2006 – Australia (Queensland)
- Molycria quadricauda (Simon, 1908) – Southern Australia
- Molycria raveni Platnick & Baehr, 2006 – Australia (Queensland)
- Molycria robert Platnick & Baehr, 2006 – Australia (Queensland)
- Molycria smithae Platnick & Baehr, 2006 – Australia (New South Wales)
- Molycria stanisici Platnick & Baehr, 2006 – Australia (Queensland)
- Molycria taroom Platnick & Baehr, 2006 – Australia (Queensland)
- Molycria thompsoni Platnick & Baehr, 2006 – Australia (Queensland)
- Molycria tooloombah Platnick & Baehr, 2006 – Australia (Queensland)
- Molycria upstart Platnick & Baehr, 2006 – Australia (Queensland)
- Molycria vokes Platnick & Baehr, 2006 – Australia (Western Australia, Northern Territory, South Australia)
- Molycria wallacei Platnick & Baehr, 2006 – Australia (Queensland)
- Molycria wardeni Platnick & Baehr, 2006 – Australia (Queensland)
- Molycria wrightae Platnick & Baehr, 2006 – Australia (Queensland)
