= Paracymbiomma =

Scientific classification
- Kingdom: Animalia
- Phylum: Arthropoda
- Subphylum: Chelicerata
- Class: Arachnida
- Order: Araneae
- Infraorder: Araneomorphae
- Family: Prodidomidae
- Genus: Paracymbiomma; Rodrigues, Cizauskas & Rheims, 2018

Type species
- P. angelim Rodrigues, Cizauskas & Rheims, 2018

Species
- 6, see text

Genus of spiders

Paracymbiomma is a genus of South American long-spinneret ground spiders. It was first described by B. V. B. Rodrigues, I. Cizauskas and C. A. Rheims in 2018, and it has only been found in Brazil.

== Species ==
As of April 2022 it contains six species:

- P. angelim Rodrigues, Cizauskas & Rheims, 2018 (type) – Brazil
- P. bocaina Rodrigues, Cizauskas & Rheims, 2018 – Brazil
- P. caecus Rodrigues, Cizauskas & Rheims, 2018 – Brazil
- P. carajas Rodrigues, Cizauskas & Rheims, 2018 – Brazil
- P. doisirmaos Rodrigues, Cizauskas & Rheims, 2018 – Brazil
- P. pauferrense Rodrigues, Cizauskas & Rheims, 2018 – Brazil
