= Wesmaldra =

Scientific classification
- Kingdom: Animalia
- Phylum: Arthropoda
- Subphylum: Chelicerata
- Class: Arachnida
- Order: Araneae
- Infraorder: Araneomorphae
- Family: Prodidomidae
- Genus: Wesmaldra; Platnick & Baehr, 2006

Type species
- W. bidgemia Platnick & Baehr, 2006

Species
- 14, see text

Genus of spiders

Wesmaldra is a genus of Australian ground spiders that was first described by Norman I. Platnick & Barbara Baehr in 2006. Originally placed with the long-spinneret ground spiders, it was transferred to the ground spiders in 2018.

== Species ==
As of June 2019 it contains fourteen species, found only in the Northern Territory and Western Australia:

- Wesmaldra baynesi Platnick & Baehr, 2006 – Australia (Western Australia)
- Wesmaldra bidgemia Platnick & Baehr, 2006 (type) – Australia (Western Australia)
- Wesmaldra bromilowi Platnick & Baehr, 2006 – Australia (Western Australia)
- Wesmaldra hirsti Platnick & Baehr, 2006 – Australia (Western Australia)
- Wesmaldra kakadu Platnick & Baehr, 2006 – Australia (Northern Territory)
- Wesmaldra learmonth Platnick & Baehr, 2006 – Australia (Western Australia)
- Wesmaldra napier Platnick & Baehr, 2006 – Australia (Western Australia)
- Wesmaldra nixaut Platnick & Baehr, 2006 – Australia (Western Australia)
- Wesmaldra rolfei Platnick & Baehr, 2006 – Australia (Western Australia)
- Wesmaldra splendida (Simon, 1908) – Australia (Western Australia)
- Wesmaldra talgomine Platnick & Baehr, 2006 – Australia (Western Australia)
- Wesmaldra urawa Platnick & Baehr, 2006 – Australia (Western Australia)
- Wesmaldra waldockae Platnick & Baehr, 2006 – Australia (Western Australia)
- Wesmaldra wiluna Platnick & Baehr, 2006 – Australia (Western Australia)
