= Chileuma =

Scientific classification
- Kingdom: Animalia
- Phylum: Arthropoda
- Subphylum: Chelicerata
- Class: Arachnida
- Order: Araneae
- Infraorder: Araneomorphae
- Family: Prodidomidae
- Genus: Chileuma; Platnick, Shadab & Sorkin, 2005

Type species
- C. paposo Platnick, Shadab & Sorkin, 2005

Species
- C. paposo Platnick, Shadab & Sorkin, 2005 – Chile; C. renca Platnick, Shadab & Sorkin, 2005 – Chile; C. serena Platnick, Shadab & Sorkin, 2005 – Chile

Genus of spiders

Chileuma is a genus of Chilean long-spinneret ground spiders that was first described by Norman I. Platnick, M. U. Shadab & L. N. Sorkin in 2005. As of June 2019 it contains only three species, found only in Chile: C. paposo, C. renca, and C. serena.
