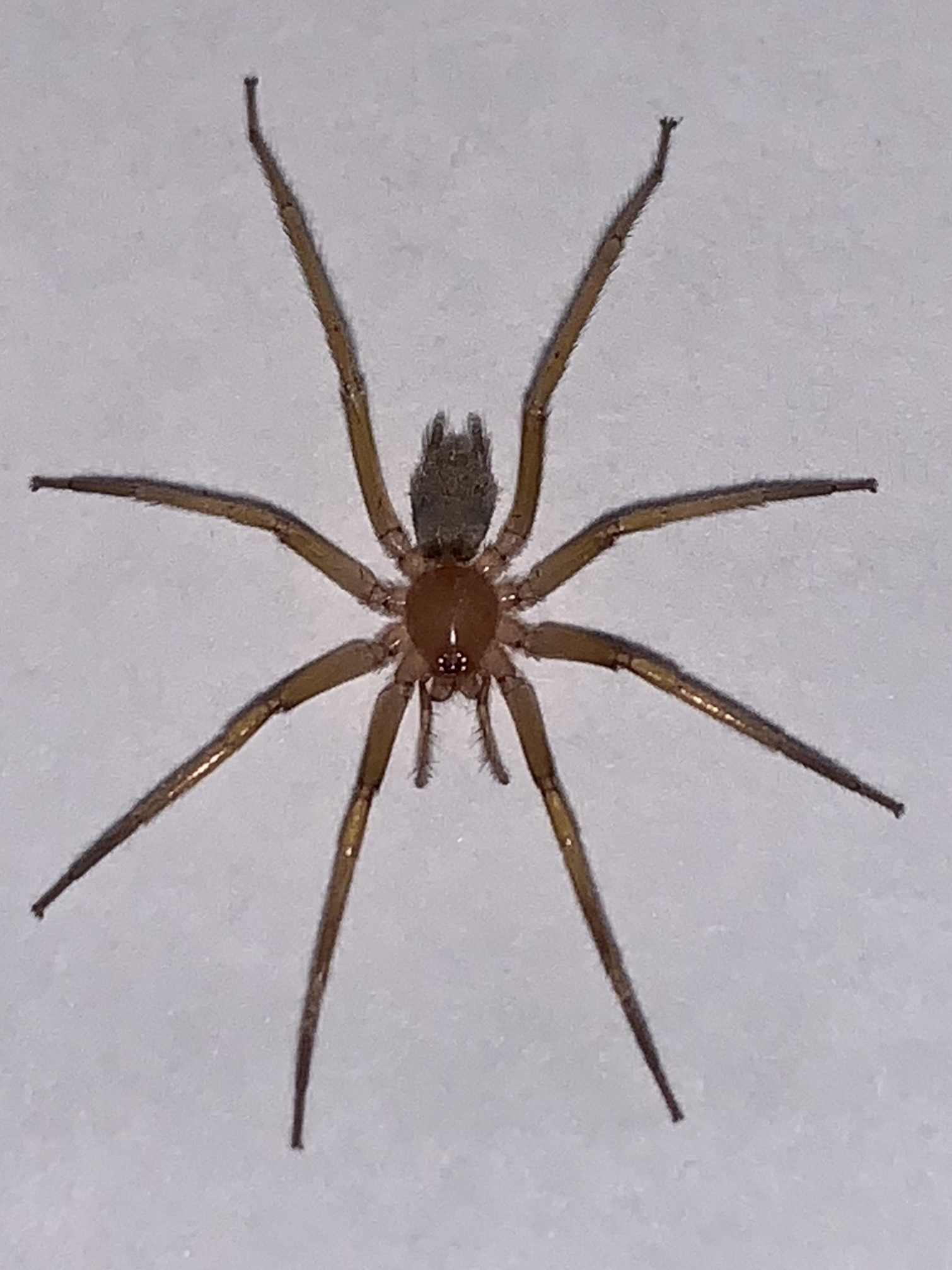

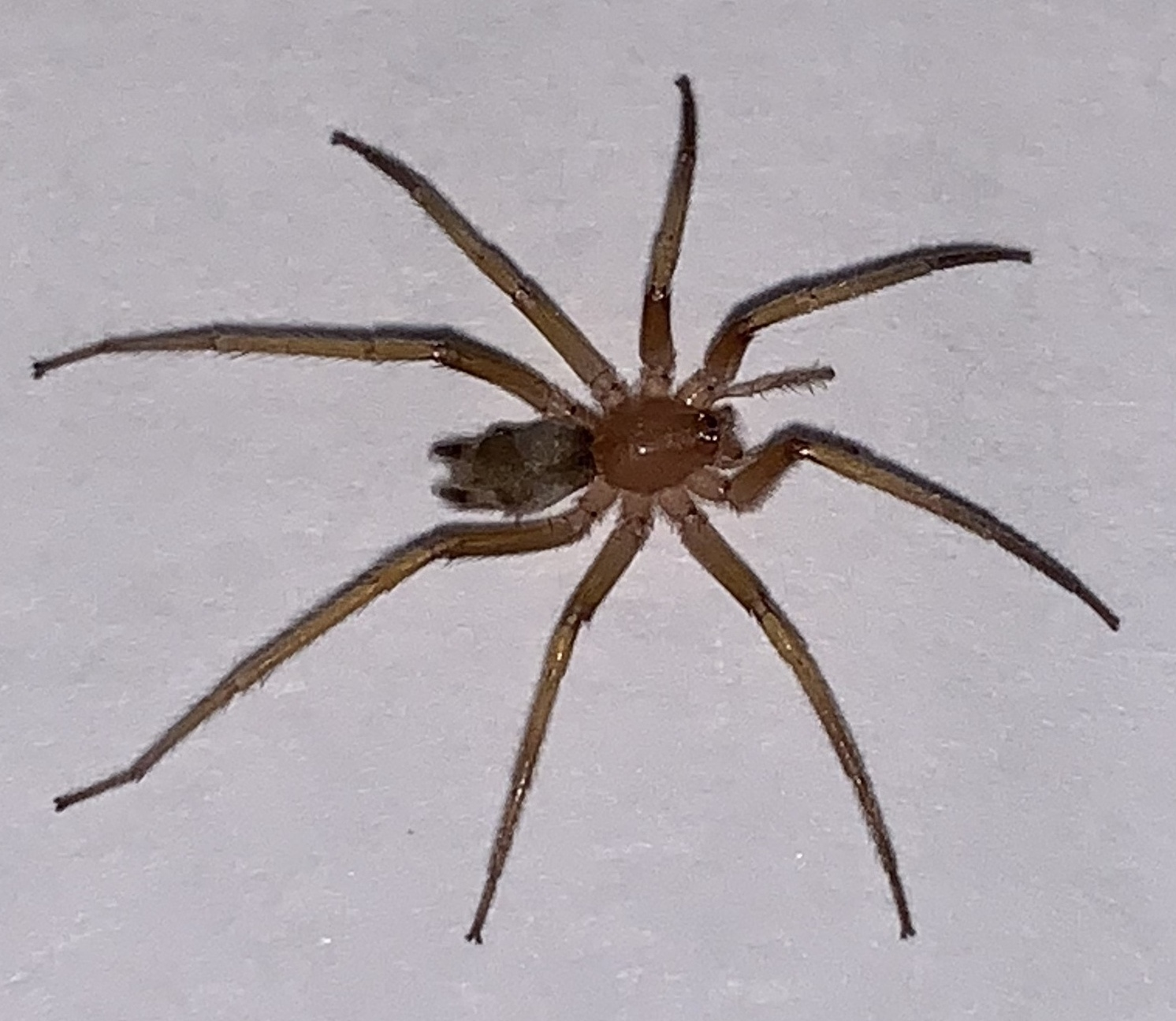

Scientific classification
- Kingdom: Animalia
- Phylum: Arthropoda
- Subphylum: Chelicerata
- Class: Arachnida
- Order: Araneae
- Infraorder: Araneomorphae
- Family: Prodidomidae
- Genus: Prodidomus
- Species: P. rufus

Binomial name
- Prodidomus rufus Hentz, 1847

= Prodidomus rufus =

Species of spider

Prodidomus rufus is a species of true spider in the family Prodidominae. It is found in Israel, China, Japan, New Caledonia, the United States, Cuba, Argentina, Chile, and St. Helena.
