= Wydundra =

Scientific classification
- Kingdom: Animalia
- Phylum: Arthropoda
- Subphylum: Chelicerata
- Class: Arachnida
- Order: Araneae
- Infraorder: Araneomorphae
- Family: Prodidomidae
- Genus: Wydundra; Platnick & Baehr, 2006

Type species
- W. osbourne Platnick & Baehr, 2006

Species
- 46, see text

Genus of spiders

Wydundra is a genus of ground spiders that was first described by Norman I. Platnick & Barbara Baehr in 2006. Originally placed with the long-spinneret ground spiders, it was transferred to the ground spiders in 2018.

== Species ==
As of June 2019 it contains forty-six species, found only in Australia and Malaysia:

- Wydundra alexandria Platnick & Baehr, 2013 – Australia (Northern Territory)
- Wydundra anjo Platnick & Baehr, 2006 – Australia (Western Australia)
- Wydundra barrow Platnick & Baehr, 2006 – Australia (Western Australia, Northern Territory)
- Wydundra camooweal Platnick & Baehr, 2013 – Australia (Queensland)
- Wydundra carinda Platnick & Baehr, 2006 – Australia (South Australia, New South Wales)
- Wydundra charnley Platnick & Baehr, 2005 – Australia (Western Australia)
- Wydundra chillagoe Platnick & Baehr, 2013 – Australia (Queensland)
- Wydundra churchillae Platnick & Baehr, 2006 – Australia (Northern Territory)
- Wydundra clifton Platnick & Baehr, 2006 – Australia (South Australia)
- Wydundra cooper Platnick & Baehr, 2006 – Australia (South Australia, New South Wales)
- Wydundra cunderdin Platnick & Baehr, 2006 – Australia (Western Australia)
- Wydundra daunton Platnick & Baehr, 2006 – Australia (Queensland)
- Wydundra drysdale Platnick & Baehr, 2006 – Australia (Western Australia)
- Wydundra ethabuka Platnick & Baehr, 2006 – Australia (Northern Territory, Queensland)
- Wydundra fitzroy Platnick & Baehr, 2006 – Australia (Queensland)
- Wydundra flattery Platnick & Baehr, 2006 – Australia (Queensland)
- Wydundra garnet Platnick & Baehr, 2006 – Australia (Queensland)
- Wydundra gibb Platnick & Baehr, 2006 – Australia (Western Australia, Northern Territory)
- Wydundra gilliat Platnick & Baehr, 2013 – Australia (Queensland)
- Wydundra gully Platnick & Baehr, 2006 – Australia (Queensland)
- Wydundra gunbiyarrmi Platnick & Baehr, 2006 – Australia (Northern Territory)
- Wydundra humbert Platnick & Baehr, 2006 – Australia (Northern Territory)
- Wydundra humptydoo Platnick & Baehr, 2006 – Australia (Northern Territory)
- Wydundra jabiru Platnick & Baehr, 2006 – Australia (Northern Territory)
- Wydundra kalamurina Platnick & Baehr, 2006 – Australia (South Australia)
- Wydundra kennedy Platnick & Baehr, 2006 – Australia (Western Australia)
- Wydundra kohi Platnick & Baehr, 2006 – Australia (Queensland)
- Wydundra leichhardti Platnick & Baehr, 2013 – Australia (Queensland)
- Wydundra lennard Platnick & Baehr, 2006 – Australia (Western Australia)
- Wydundra lindsay Platnick & Baehr, 2006 – Australia (South Australia)
- Wydundra lowrie Platnick & Baehr, 2006 – Australia (Queensland)
- Wydundra moolooloo Platnick & Baehr, 2006 – Australia (South Australia)
- Wydundra moondarra Platnick & Baehr, 2006 – Australia (Queensland)
- Wydundra morton Platnick & Baehr, 2006 – Australia (New South Wales)
- Wydundra neinaut Platnick & Baehr, 2006 – Australia (Queensland)
- Wydundra newcastle Platnick & Baehr, 2006 – Australia (Queensland)
- Wydundra normanton Platnick & Baehr, 2006 – Australia (Queensland)
- Wydundra octomile Platnick & Baehr, 2006 – Australia (Queensland)
- Wydundra osbourne Platnick & Baehr, 2006 (type) – Australia (Queensland)
- Wydundra percy Platnick & Baehr, 2006 – Australia (Queensland)
- Wydundra solo Platnick & Baehr, 2006 – Australia (Western Australia)
- Wydundra uluru Platnick & Baehr, 2006 – Australia (Western Australia, Northern Territory)
- Wydundra undara Platnick & Baehr, 2006 – Australia (Queensland)
- Wydundra voc (Deeleman-Reinhold, 2001) – Malaysia, Indonesia Moluccas)
- Wydundra webberae Platnick & Baehr, 2006 – Australia (Northern Territory)
- Wydundra windsor Platnick & Baehr, 2006 – Australia (Queensland)
