= Nopyllus =

Scientific classification
- Domain: Eukaryota
- Kingdom: Animalia
- Phylum: Arthropoda
- Subphylum: Chelicerata
- Class: Arachnida
- Order: Araneae
- Infraorder: Araneomorphae
- Family: Prodidomidae
- Genus: Nopyllus; Ott, 2014

Species
- Nopyllus isabelae (Brescovit & Lise, 1993); Nopyllus vicente Ott, 2014

Genus of spiders

Nopyllus is a genus of spiders in the family Prodidominae. It was first described in 2014 by Ott, both found in Brazil. As of 2017, it contains 2 species.
