= Chileomma =

Scientific classification
- Kingdom: Animalia
- Phylum: Arthropoda
- Subphylum: Chelicerata
- Class: Arachnida
- Order: Araneae
- Infraorder: Araneomorphae
- Family: Prodidomidae
- Genus: Chileomma; Platnick, Shadab & Sorkin, 2005

Type species
- C. ruiles Platnick, Shadab & Sorkin, 2005

Species
- 7, see text

Genus of spiders

Chileomma is a genus of Chilean long-spinneret ground spiders that was first described by Norman I. Platnick, M. U. Shadab & L. N. Sorkin in 2005.

== Species ==
As of June 2019 it contains seven species, found only in Chile:

- Chileomma campana Platnick, Shadab & Sorkin, 2005 – Chile
- Chileomma chilensis Platnick, Shadab & Sorkin, 2005 – Chile
- Chileomma franckei Platnick, Shadab & Sorkin, 2005 – Chile
- Chileomma malleco Platnick, Shadab & Sorkin, 2005 – Chile
- Chileomma petorca Platnick, Shadab & Sorkin, 2005 – Chile
- Chileomma rinconada Platnick, Shadab & Sorkin, 2005 – Chile
- Chileomma ruiles Platnick, Shadab & Sorkin, 2005 (type) – Chile
