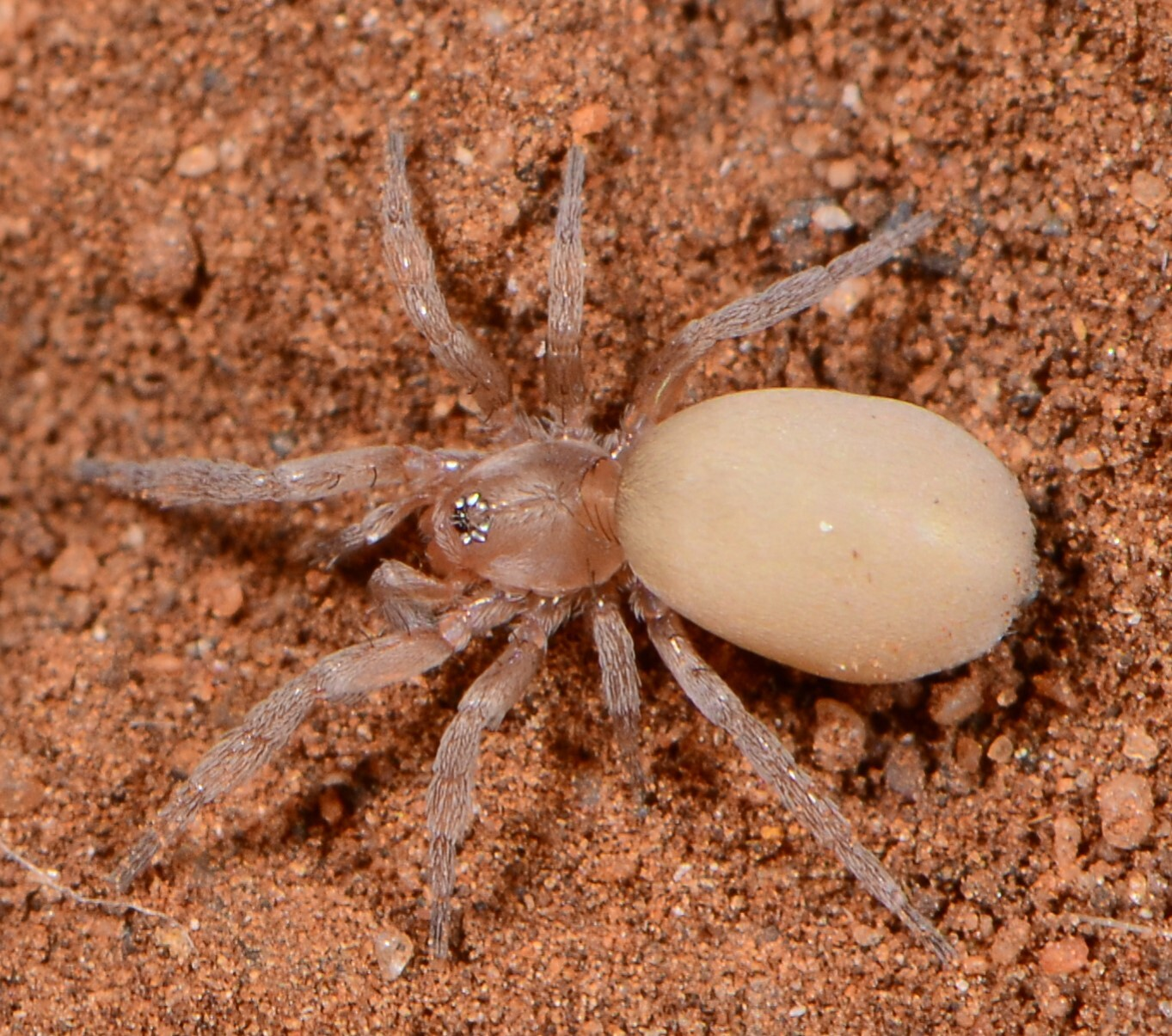
- Female
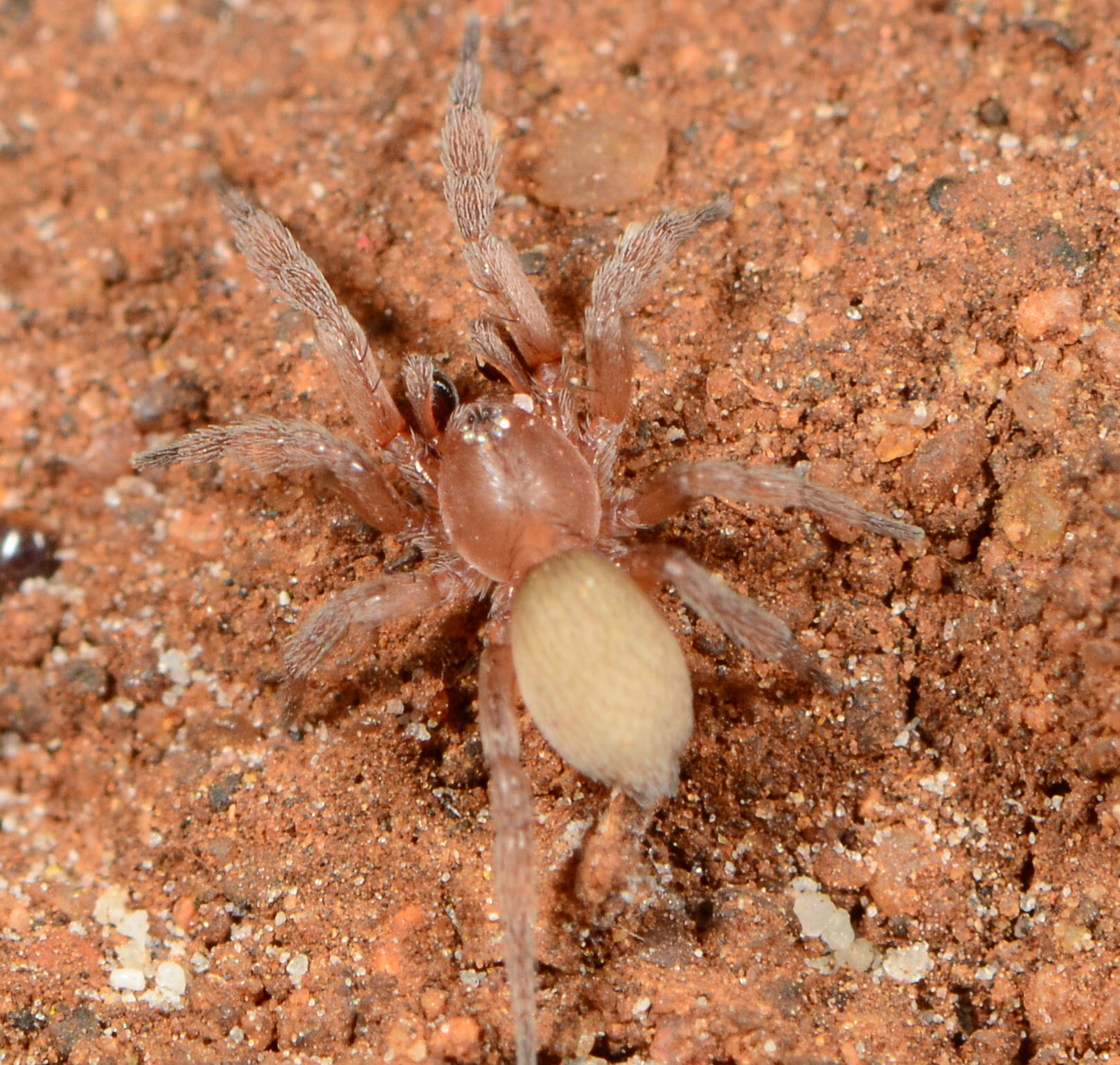
- Male

Scientific classification
- Kingdom: Animalia
- Phylum: Arthropoda
- Subphylum: Chelicerata
- Class: Arachnida
- Order: Araneae
- Infraorder: Araneomorphae
- Family: Prodidomidae
- Genus: Eleleis
- Species: E. limpopo

Binomial name
- Eleleis limpopo Rodrigues & Rheims, 2020

= Eleleis limpopo =

Limpopo Eleleis Ground Spider

Species of spider

Eleleis limpopo is a species of spider in the family Prodidomidae. It occurs in South Africa and Zambia and is commonly known as the Limpopo Eleleis ground spider.

== Distribution ==
Eleleis limpopo is found in South Africa and Zambia. In South Africa, it is recorded from Gauteng, Limpopo, and Mpumalanga provinces. Notable locations include Irene Gem Village Field, Groenkloof Nature Reserve, Ezemvelo Nature Reserve, and Bronkhorstspruit in Gauteng; Tuinplaas on the Springbokvlakte and Little Leigh in the Western Soutpansberg in Limpopo; and Marble Hall in Mpumalanga.

== Habitat and ecology ==
Eleleis limpopo are free-running ground dwellers sampled from the Grassland and Savanna biomes.

As part of the Gauteng Grassland Project, the species has been sampled annually since 2012 from grasslands around Pretoria, in Irene, and the Groenkloof Nature Reserve. They are often found under rocks and immediately move around to try to get under the rock again when disturbed. In Irene they were always associated with small red ants running between them. On the Springbok Flats, a large number of specimens were sampled from pitfall traps over a period of a year.

The males were sampled from September, October to November as well as in June and July. The females were sampled mainly in October. In Irene the species was photographed on 10 occasions with males mainly during June and July and females in April. They were found under rocks always associated with small red ants running between them.

== Description ==
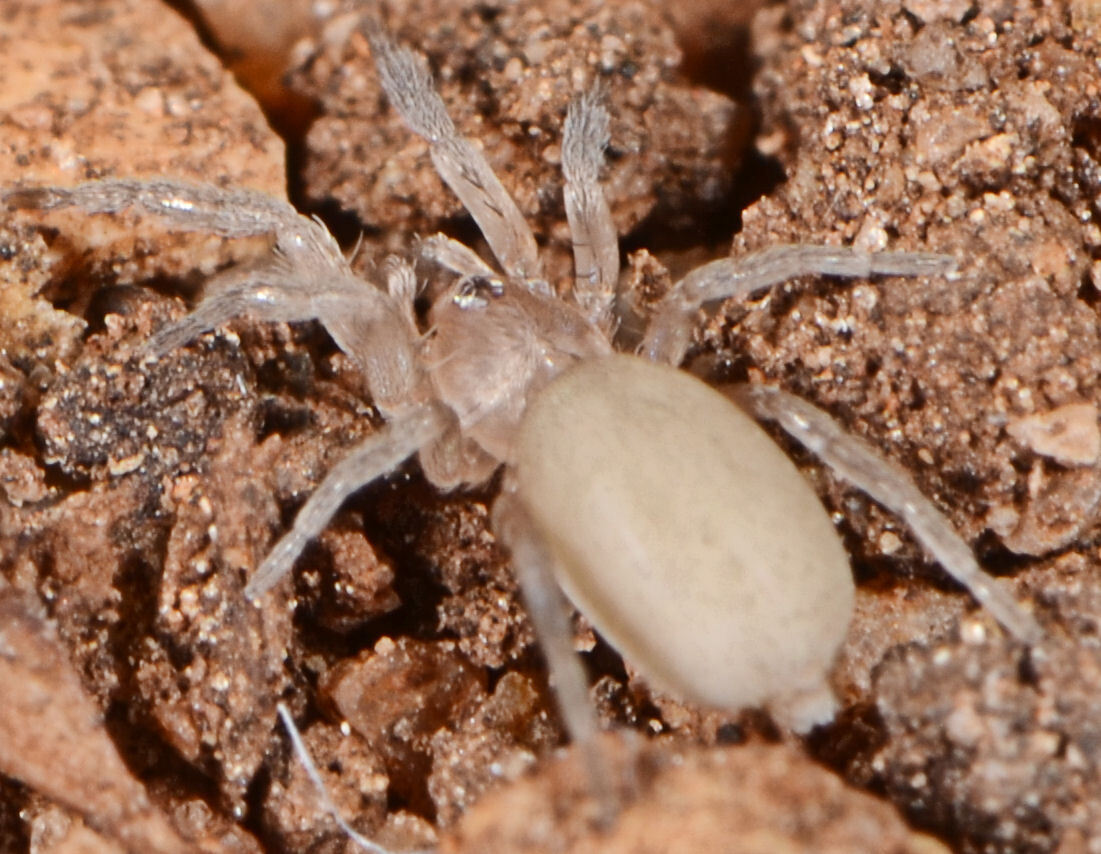
female

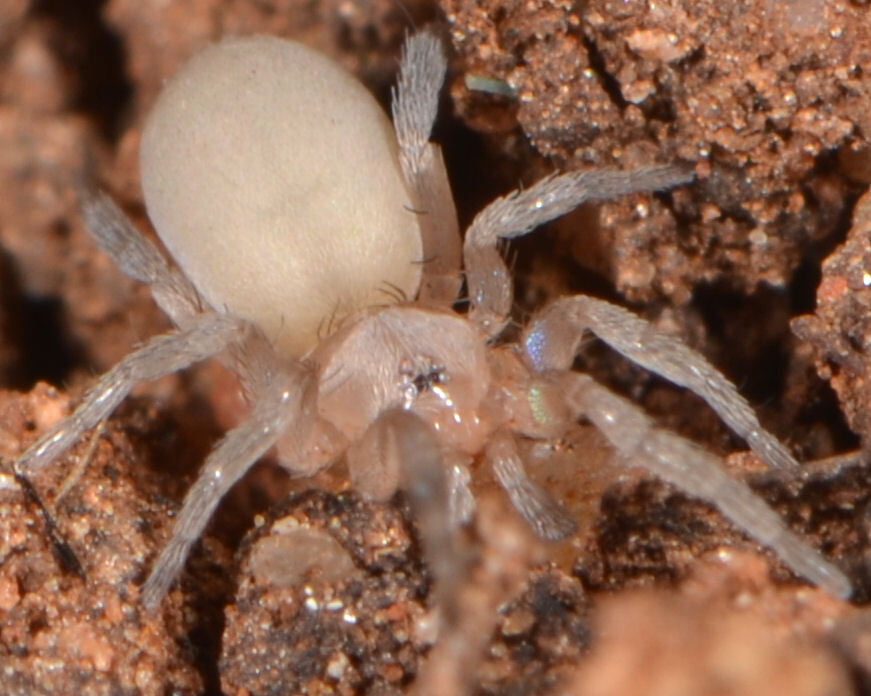
female

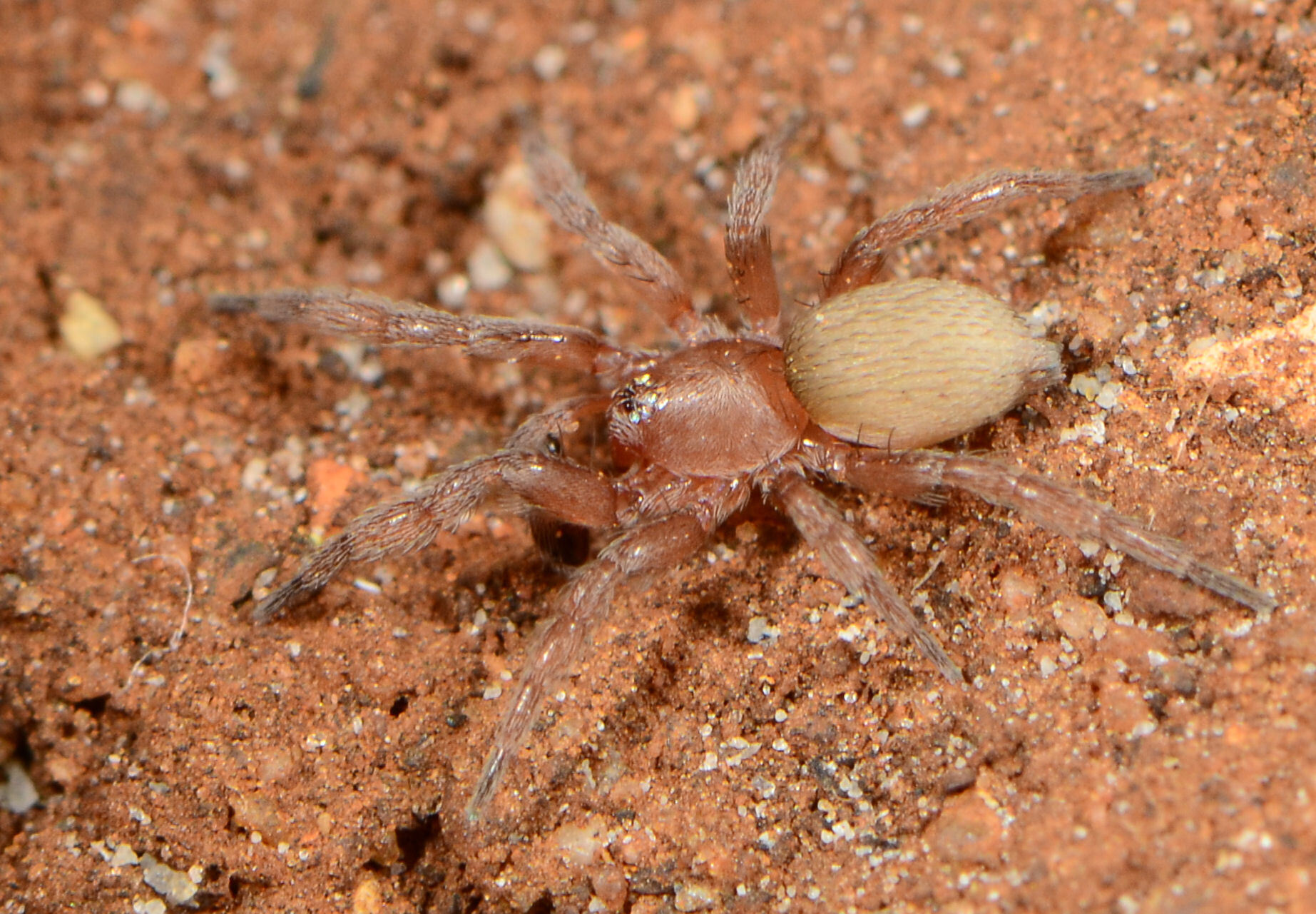
male

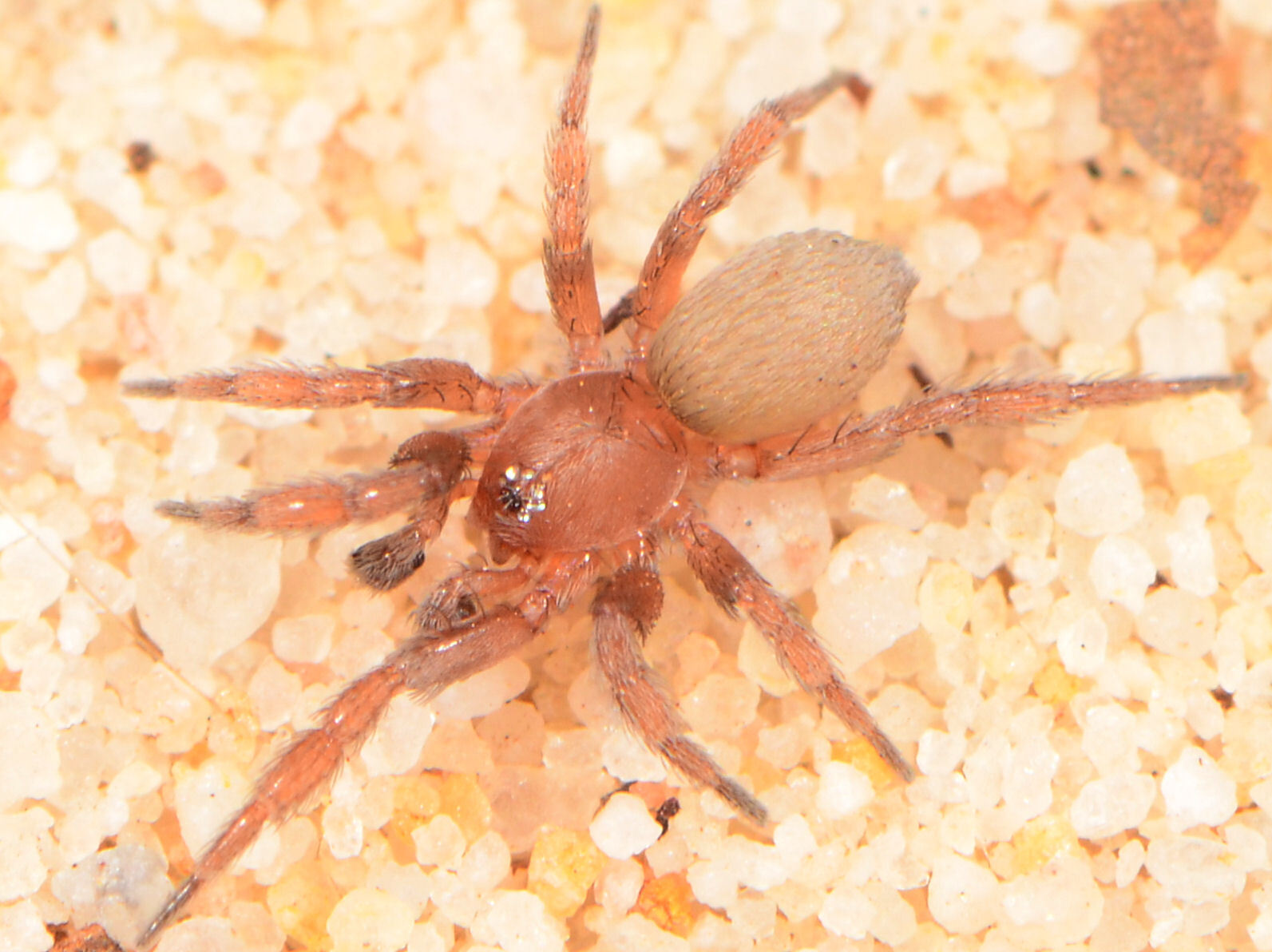
male

Eleleis limpopo is known from both sexes. It differs from other species of the genus by the strong brown coloration of the carapace and legs.

== Conservation ==
Eleleis limpopo is listed as Least Concern due to its wide range. No known threats have been identified, and the species is protected in the Groenkloof Nature Reserve and Ezemvelo Nature Reserve.

== Taxonomy ==
The species was described by Rodrigues & Rheims in 2020 from Tuinplaas, Springbokvlakte. It is known from both sexes.
