= Neozimiris =

Scientific classification
- Kingdom: Animalia
- Phylum: Arthropoda
- Subphylum: Chelicerata
- Class: Arachnida
- Order: Araneae
- Infraorder: Araneomorphae
- Family: Prodidomidae
- Genus: Neozimiris; Simon, 1903

Type species
- N. pubescens (Banks, 1898)

Species
- 9, see text

Synonyms
- Pericuris Chamberlin, 1924

Genus of spiders

Neozimiris is a genus of long-spinneret ground spiders that was first described by Eugène Louis Simon in 1903.

== Species ==
As of August 2022 it contains nine species, found in the Caribbean, Ecuador, Colombia, the United States, Mexico, and Panama:

- Neozimiris chickeringi Platnick & Shadab, 1976 – Panama
- Neozimiris crinis Platnick & Shadab, 1976 – Mexico
- Neozimiris escandoni Müller, 1987 – Colombia
- Neozimiris exuma Platnick & Shadab, 1976 – Bahama Is.
- Neozimiris levii Platnick & Shadab, 1976 – Curaçao
- Neozimiris nuda Platnick & Shadab, 1976 – Puerto Rico
- Neozimiris pinta Platnick & Shadab, 1976 – Ecuador (Galapagos Is.)
- Neozimiris pinzon Platnick & Shadab, 1976 – Ecuador (Galapagos Is.)
- Neozimiris pubescens (Banks, 1898) (type) – USA, Mexico
