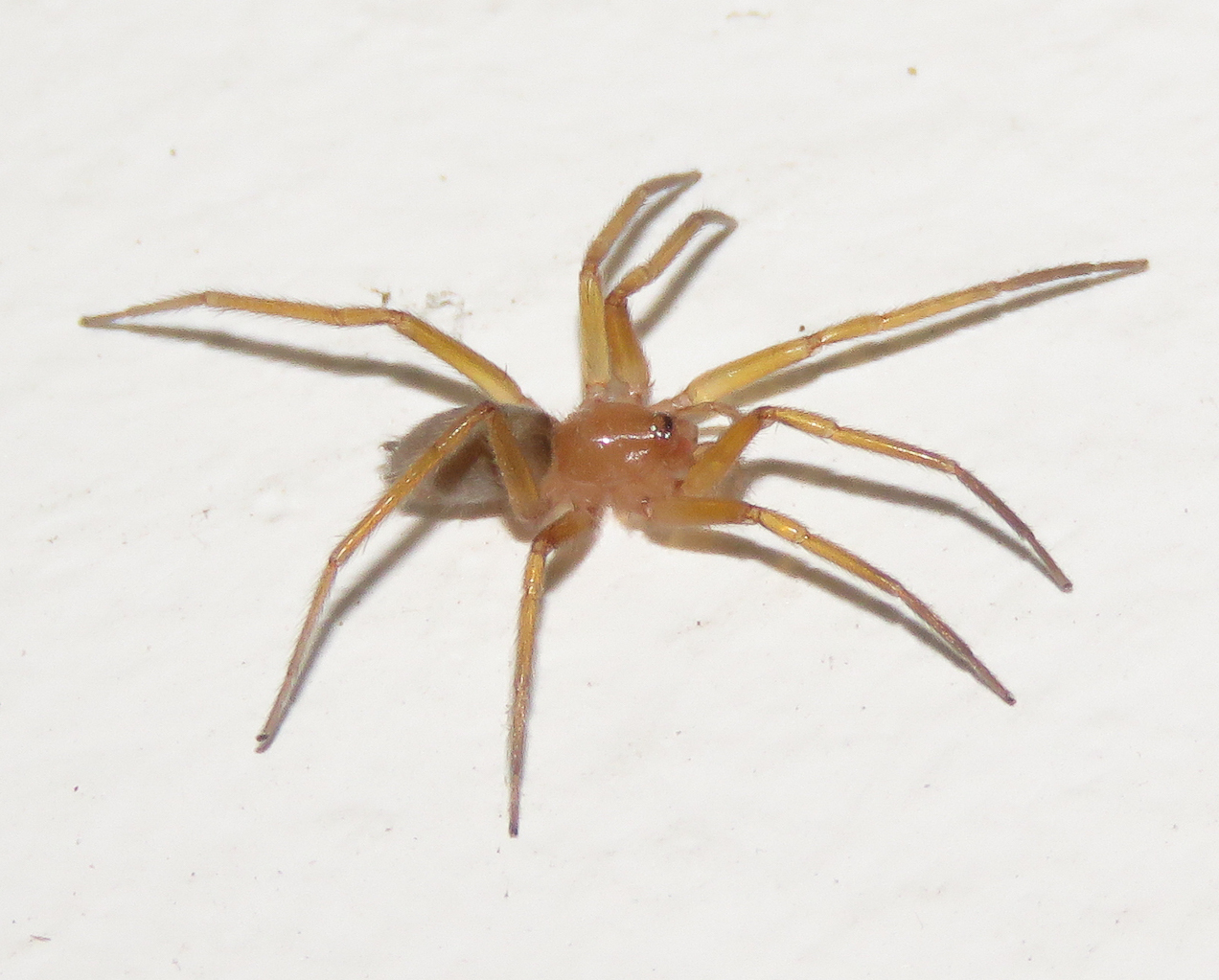
- Z. doriae in Brazil

Scientific classification
- Kingdom: Animalia
- Phylum: Arthropoda
- Subphylum: Chelicerata
- Class: Arachnida
- Order: Araneae
- Infraorder: Araneomorphae
- Family: Prodidomidae
- Genus: Zimiris; Simon, 1882

Type species
- Z. doriae Simon, 1882

Species
- Z. diffusa Platnick & Penney, 2004; Z. doriae Simon, 1882

= Zimiris =

Genus of spiders

Zimiris is a genus of long-spinneret ground spiders that was first described by Eugène Louis Simon in 1882. As of June 2019 it contains only two species, found in the Caribbean, Africa, South America, Asia, Germany, Mexico, and on Saint Helena: Z. diffusa and Z. doriae.

== Species ==
As of January 2026, this genus includes two species:

- Zimiris diffusa Platnick & Penney, 2004 – Yemen (Socotra), India. Introduced to St. Helena
- Zimiris doriae Simon, 1882 – Ivory Coast, Sudan, Eritrea, Yemen, Iran, Pakistan, India. Introduced to Mexico, Caribbean, Venezuela, French Guiana, Brazil, Ascension Island, Germany, Indonesia (Java), Malaysia
