= Anagrina =

Scientific classification
- Kingdom: Animalia
- Phylum: Arthropoda
- Subphylum: Chelicerata
- Class: Arachnida
- Order: Araneae
- Infraorder: Araneomorphae
- Family: Prodidomidae
- Genus: Anagrina; Berland, 1920

Type species
- A. alticola Berland, 1920

Species
- A. alticola Berland, 1920 – East Africa; A. nigritibialis Denis, 1955 – Niger

Genus of spiders

Anagrina is a genus of African long-spinneret ground spiders that was first described by Lucien Berland in 1920. As of June 2019 it contains only two species, found only in Africa: A. alticola and A. nigritibialis.
