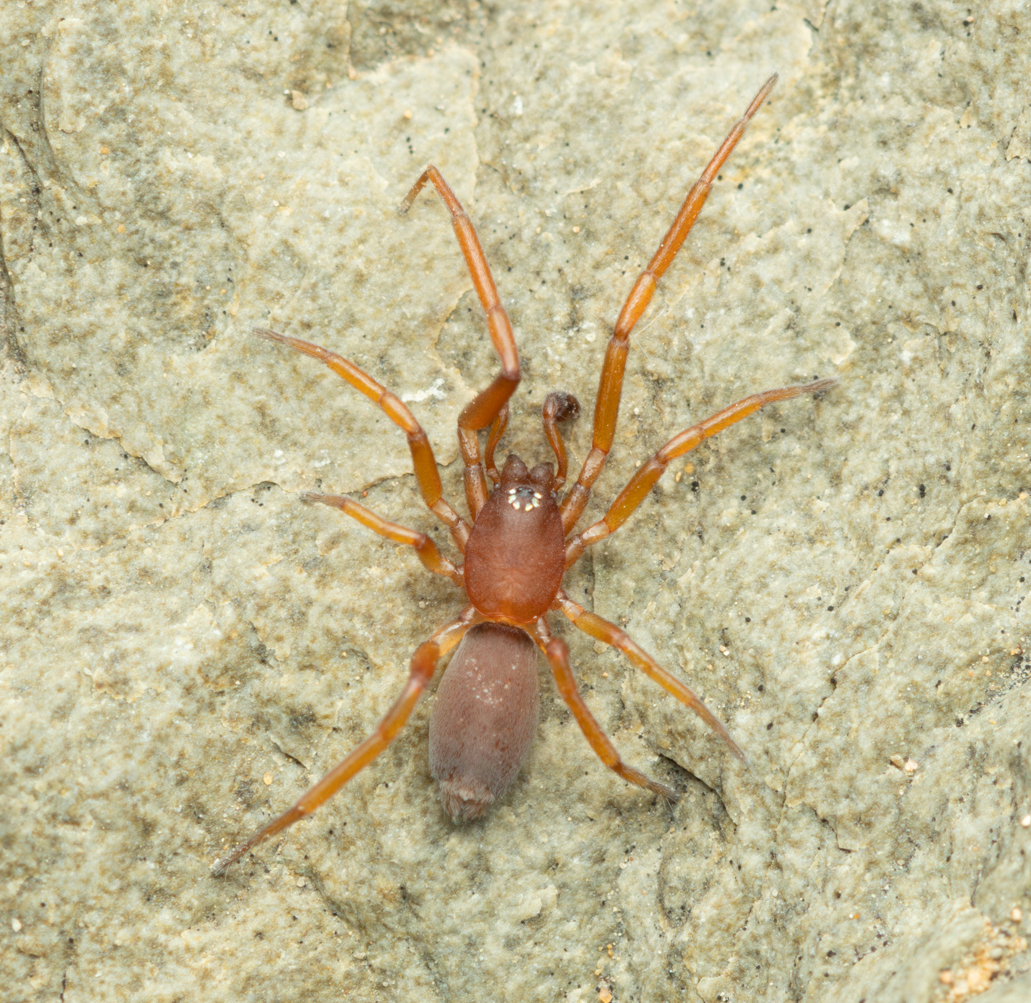
- male P. purpurascens
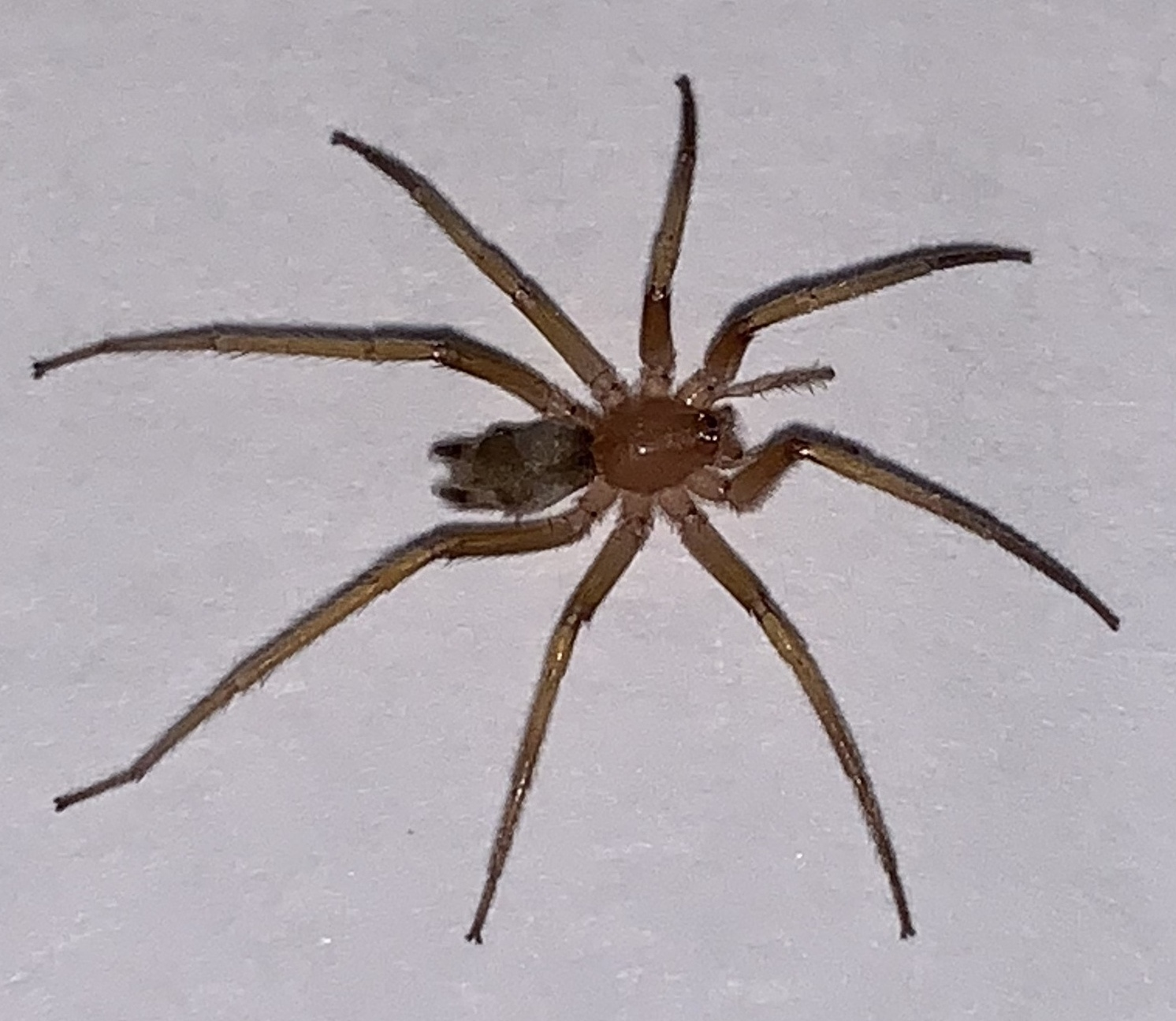
- P. rufus

Scientific classification
- Kingdom: Animalia
- Phylum: Arthropoda
- Subphylum: Chelicerata
- Class: Arachnida
- Order: Araneae
- Infraorder: Araneomorphae
- Family: Prodidomidae
- Genus: Prodidomus; Hentz, 1847

Type species
- P. rufus Hentz, 1847

Species
- 54, see text

Synonyms
- Hyltonia Birabén, 1954

= Prodidomus =

Genus of spiders

Prodidomus is a genus of long-spinneret ground spiders that was first described by Nicholas Marcellus Hentz in 1847.

== Distribution ==
Spiders in this genus are found in Africa, Europe, Oceania, Asia, South America, the United States, on the Greater Antilles, and Saint Helena.

== Description ==
Prodidomus are small spiders with a total length of males 1.9–4.3 mm and females 1.8–5.0 mm.

Carapace broadly oval, frontally straight, weakly covered with grey setae or bare. Longitudinal fovea absent or weak. Eight eyes with anterior row straight or weakly recurved and posterior row strongly procurved. Four eyes of each side virtually contiguous, forming triangle with posterior lateral eyes largest. Anterior median eyes circular and dark, while posterior median eyes are separated by their long diameter or less. Clypeus low, shorter than anterior lateral eyes diameter, curved downwards. Chelicerae widely divergent.

Abdomen pale, with or without scattered, short, recumbent, grey setae. Anterior lateral spinnerets 10–20% of abdominal length, contiguous or slightly separated, with long piriform gland spigots. Posterior median eyes small while posterior lateral eyes are greatly enlarged and canoe-shaped. Legs laterigrade with leg formula 4123 and sparse setae with few weak spines.

== Species ==
As of September 2025 it contains 54 species:

- Prodidomus amaranthinus (Lucas, 1846) – Mediterranean
- Prodidomus aurantiacus Simon, 1890 – Yemen
- Prodidomus beattyi Platnick, 1977 – Australia (Western Australia, Northern Territory)
- Prodidomus bendee Platnick & Baehr, 2006 – Australia (Queensland)
- Prodidomus bicolor Denis, 1957 – Sudan
- Prodidomus birmanicus Thorell, 1897 – Myanmar
- Prodidomus bryantae Alayón, 1995 – Cuba
- Prodidomus capensis Purcell, 1904 – South Africa
- Prodidomus chaperi (Simon, 1884) – India
- Prodidomus dalmasi Berland, 1920 – Kenya
- Prodidomus djibutensis Dalmas, 1919 – Somalia
- Prodidomus domesticus Lessert, 1938 – DR Congo
- Prodidomus duffeyi Cooke, 1964 – Ascension Island
- Prodidomus flavidus (Simon, 1884) – Algeria
- Prodidomus flavipes Lawrence, 1952 – South Africa
- Prodidomus flavus Platnick & Baehr, 2006 – Australia (Queensland)
- Prodidomus geniculosus Dalmas, 1919 – Tunisia
- Prodidomus granulosus Cooke, 1964 – Rwanda
- Prodidomus inexpectatus Zamani, Chatzaki, Esyunin & Marusik, 2021 – Iran
- Prodidomus kimberley Platnick & Baehr, 2006 – Australia (Western Australia, Northern Territory)
- Prodidomus lampeli Cooke, 1964 – Ethiopia
- Prodidomus latebricola Cooke, 1964 – Tanzania
- Prodidomus longiventris (Dalmas, 1919) – Philippines
- Prodidomus margala Platnick, 1976 – Pakistan
- Prodidomus maximus Lessert, 1936 – Mozambique
- Prodidomus nigellus Simon, 1890 – Yemen
- Prodidomus nigricaudus Simon, 1893 – Venezuela
- Prodidomus opacithorax Simon, 1893 – Venezuela
- Prodidomus palkai Cooke, 1972 – India
- Prodidomus papavanasanemensis Cooke, 1972 – India
- Prodidomus purpurascens Purcell, 1904 – South Africa
- Prodidomus purpureus Simon, 1907 – Guinea-Bissau
- Prodidomus redikorzevi Spassky, 1940 – Turkey, Azerbaijan, Iraq, Iran, Kazakhstan, Turkmenistan
- Prodidomus reticulatus Lawrence, 1927 – Namibia
- Prodidomus revocatus Cooke, 1964 – Mauritius
- Prodidomus robustus Dalmas, 1919 – Ethiopia
- Prodidomus rodolphianus Dalmas, 1919 – Kenya
- Prodidomus rollasoni Cooke, 1964 – Libya
- Prodidomus rufus Hentz, 1847 – Native probably to Africa, Mediterranean, Israel, Iraq. Introduced to USA, Cuba, Chile, Argentina, St. Helena, China, Japan, New Caledonia (type species)
- Prodidomus saharanpurensis (Tikader, 1982) – India
- Prodidomus sampeyae Platnick & Baehr, 2006 – Australia (Western Australia)
- Prodidomus seemani Platnick & Baehr, 2006 – Australia (Queensland)
- Prodidomus simoni Dalmas, 1919 – South Africa
- Prodidomus singulus Suman, 1967 – Hawaii
- Prodidomus sirohi Platnick, 1976 – India
- Prodidomus stella (Saaristo, 2002) – Seychelles
- Prodidomus tigrinus Dalmas, 1919 – Sierra Leone
- Prodidomus tirumalai Cooke, 1972 – India
- Prodidomus trihelicoides Seropian, Bulbulashvili, Makharadze & Baznikin, 2024 – Georgia
- Prodidomus venkateswarai Cooke, 1972 – India
- Prodidomus watongwensis Cooke, 1964 – Tanzania
- Prodidomus woodleigh Platnick & Baehr, 2006 – Australia (Western Australia)
- Prodidomus wunderlichi Deeleman-Reinhold, 2001 – Thailand
- Prodidomus yorke Platnick & Baehr, 2006 – Australia (Queensland)
