= Moreno (spider) =

Scientific classification
- Kingdom: Animalia
- Phylum: Arthropoda
- Subphylum: Chelicerata
- Class: Arachnida
- Order: Araneae
- Infraorder: Araneomorphae
- Family: Gnaphosidae
- Genus: Moreno; Mello-Leitão, 1940

Type species
- M. morenoi Mello-Leitão, 1940

Species
- 6, see text

Genus of spiders

Moreno is a genus of South American long-spinneret ground spiders that was first described by Cândido Firmino de Mello-Leitão in 1940.

== Species ==
As of August 2022 it contains six species, found only in Argentina and Chile:

- Moreno chacabuco Platnick, Shadab & Sorkin, 2005 – Chile
- Moreno chivato Platnick, Shadab & Sorkin, 2005 – Chile
- Moreno grande Platnick, Shadab & Sorkin, 2005 – Chile
- Moreno morenoi Mello-Leitão, 1940 (type) – Argentina
- Moreno neuquen Platnick, Shadab & Sorkin, 2005 – Argentina
- Moreno ramirezi Platnick, Shadab & Sorkin, 2005 – Argentina
