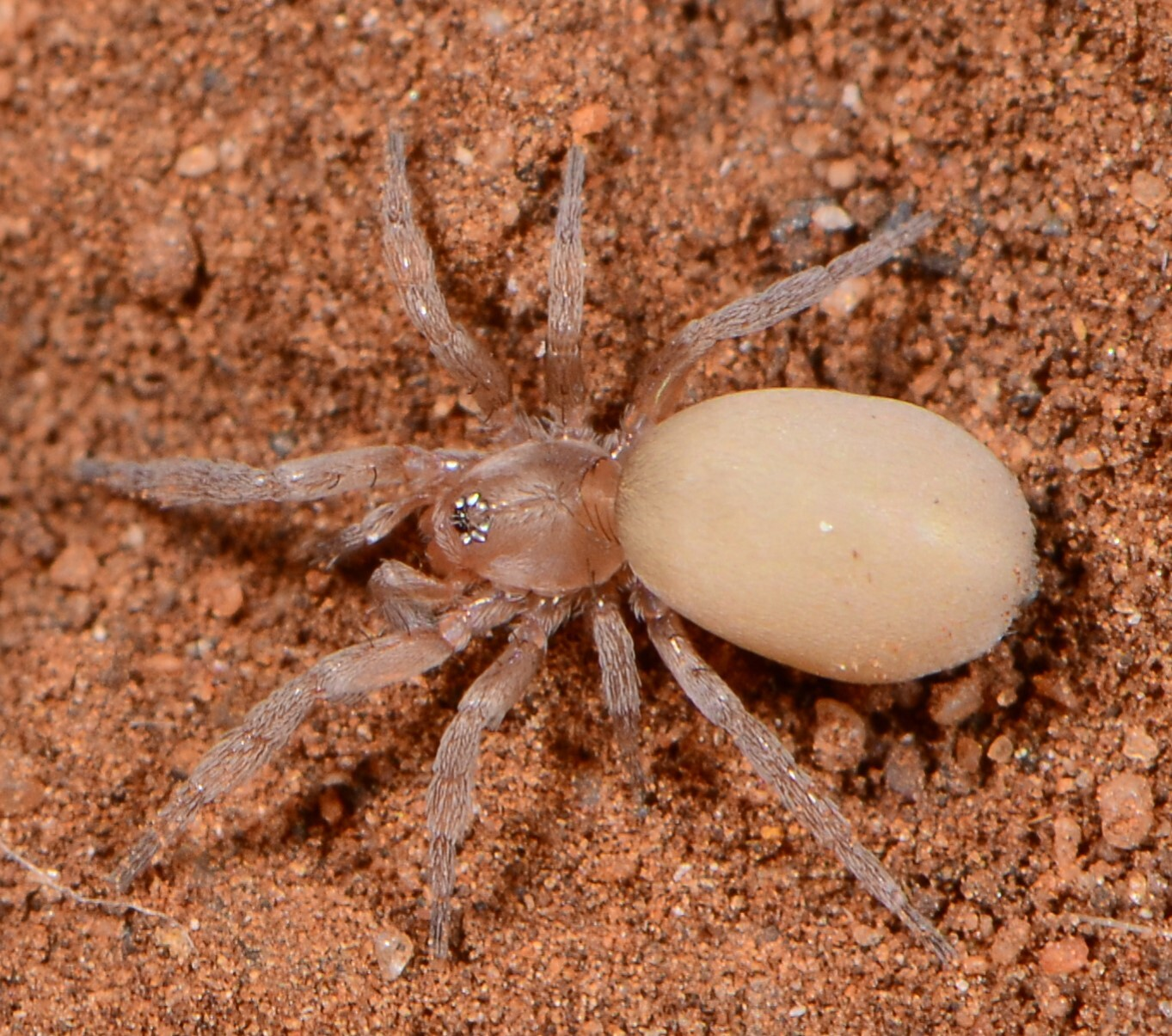
- Female E. limpopo
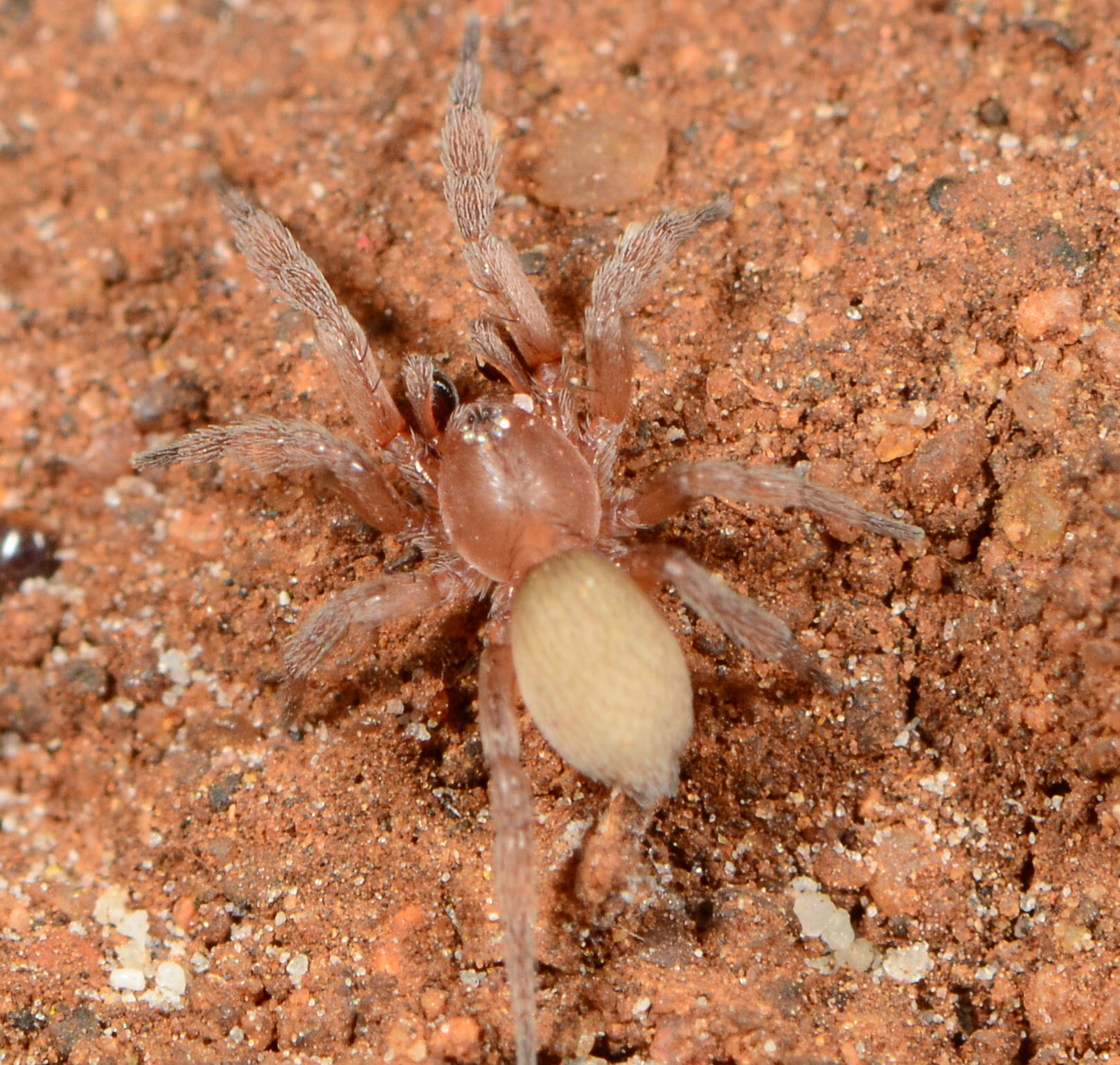
- Male E. limpopo

Scientific classification
- Kingdom: Animalia
- Phylum: Arthropoda
- Subphylum: Chelicerata
- Class: Arachnida
- Order: Araneae
- Infraorder: Araneomorphae
- Family: Prodidomidae
- Genus: Eleleis; Simon, 1893

Type species
- E. crinita Simon, 1893

Species
- 9, see text

= Eleleis =

Genus of spiders

Eleleis is a genus of spiders in the family Prodidominae. It was first described by Eugène Simon in 1893, and is only found in southern Africa.

== Description ==
Species in the genus Eleleis have a total length of 1.98–3.72 mm in females and 1.72–3.90 mm in males. The carapace is longer than wide, slightly narrow at the cephalic region, and almost oval. The fovea is absent to very long and oblique, with clavate setae present on the thoracic area. Eight eyes are present with the posterior eye row strongly procurved and the anterior eye row approximately straight.

The sternum is longer than wide with an anterior margin that is straight and rebordered anteriorly and laterally. The posterior region strongly protrudes between coxae IV with numerous long and erect setae. The abdomen is oval and longer than wide, with the posterior region having large and robust clavate setae. Scales are absent but large and robust clavate setae are present on the posterior region of the abdomen.

Six spinnerets are present, with anterior lateral spinnerets longer than wide and separated from each other by less than their diameter. The legs have clavate setae resembling spines with a leg formula of 4123.

== Species ==
As of September 2025 it contains nine species:

- Eleleis crinita Simon, 1893 – South Africa (type species)
- Eleleis etosha Rodrigues & Rheims, 2020 – Namibia
- Eleleis haddadi Rodrigues & Rheims, 2020 – South Africa
- Eleleis himba Rodrigues & Rheims, 2020 – Namibia
- Eleleis leleupi Rodrigues & Rheims, 2020 – South Africa
- Eleleis limpopo Rodrigues & Rheims, 2020 – Zambia, South Africa
- Eleleis luderitz Rodrigues & Rheims, 2020 – Cabo Verde, Namibia
- Eleleis okavango Rodrigues & Rheims, 2020 – Namibia, Botswana
- Eleleis solitaria Rodrigues & Rheims, 2020 – Cape Verde
