= Cryptoerithus =

Scientific classification
- Kingdom: Animalia
- Phylum: Arthropoda
- Subphylum: Chelicerata
- Class: Arachnida
- Order: Araneae
- Infraorder: Araneomorphae
- Family: Prodidomidae
- Genus: Cryptoerithus; Rainbow, 1915

Type species
- C. occultus Rainbow, 1915

Species
- 19, see text

Genus of spiders

Cryptoerithus is a genus of Australian ground spiders that was first described by William Joseph Rainbow in 1915. Originally placed with the long-spinneret ground spiders, it was transferred to the ground spiders in 2018.

== Species ==
As of March 2020 it contains nineteen species, found in Western Australia, South Australia, Queensland, and the Northern Territory:

- Cryptoerithus annaburroo Platnick & Baehr, 2006 – Australia (Northern Territory)
- Cryptoerithus griffith Platnick & Baehr, 2006 – Australia (Queensland, South Australia)
- Cryptoerithus halifax Platnick & Baehr, 2006 – Australia (South Australia)
- Cryptoerithus halli Platnick & Baehr, 2006 – Australia (Western Australia)
- Cryptoerithus harveyi Platnick & Baehr, 2006 – Australia (Western Australia)
- Cryptoerithus hasenpuschi Platnick & Baehr, 2006 – Australia (Queensland)
- Cryptoerithus lawlessi Platnick & Baehr, 2006 – Australia (Queensland)
- Cryptoerithus melindae Platnick & Baehr, 2006 – Australia (Western Australia)
- Cryptoerithus nichtaut Platnick & Baehr, 2006 – Australia (Queensland)
- Cryptoerithus ninan Platnick & Baehr, 2006 – Australia (Western Australia)
- Cryptoerithus nonaut Platnick & Baehr, 2006 – Australia (Northern Territory, South Australia)
- Cryptoerithus nopaut Platnick & Baehr, 2006 – Australia (Western Australia)
- Cryptoerithus nyetaut Platnick & Baehr, 2006 – Australia (Northern Territory)
- Cryptoerithus occultus Rainbow, 1915 (type) – Australia (Western Australia, Northern Territory, South Australia)
- Cryptoerithus quamby Platnick & Baehr, 2006 – Australia (Queensland)
- Cryptoerithus quobba Platnick & Baehr, 2006 – Southern Australia
- Cryptoerithus rough Platnick & Baehr, 2006 – Australia (South Australia)
- Cryptoerithus shadabi Platnick & Baehr, 2006 – Southern Australia
- Cryptoerithus stuart Platnick & Baehr, 2006 – Australia (Northern Territory)
