= Nomindra =

Scientific classification
- Kingdom: Animalia
- Phylum: Arthropoda
- Subphylum: Chelicerata
- Class: Arachnida
- Order: Araneae
- Infraorder: Araneomorphae
- Family: Prodidomidae
- Genus: Nomindra; Platnick & Baehr, 2006

Type species
- N. kinchega Platnick & Baehr, 2006

Species
- 16, see text

Genus of spiders

Nomindra is a genus of Australian ground spiders that was first described by Norman I. Platnick & Barbara Baehr in 2006. Originally placed with the long-spinneret ground spiders, it was transferred to the ground spiders in 2018.

== Species ==
As of June 2019 it contains sixteen species, found in Victoria, Queensland, South Australia, Western Australia, and the Northern Territory:

- Nomindra arenaria Platnick & Baehr, 2006 – Australia (Northern Territory)
- Nomindra barlee Platnick & Baehr, 2006 – Australia (Western Australia)
- Nomindra berrimah Platnick & Baehr, 2006 – Australia (Northern Territory)
- Nomindra cocklebiddy Platnick & Baehr, 2006 – Australia (Western Australia)
- Nomindra cooma Platnick & Baehr, 2006 – Australia (Western Australia)
- Nomindra fisheri Platnick & Baehr, 2006 – Australia (Northern Territory)
- Nomindra flavipes (Simon, 1908) – Australia (Western Australia, South Australia)
- Nomindra gregory Platnick & Baehr, 2006 – Australia (Western Australia, Northern Territory)
- Nomindra indulkana Platnick & Baehr, 2006 – Australia (Western Australia, South Australia)
- Nomindra jarrnarm Platnick & Baehr, 2006 – Australia (Western Australia, Northern Territory)
- Nomindra kinchega Platnick & Baehr, 2006 (type) – Australia (South Australia, Queensland to Victoria)
- Nomindra leeuweni Platnick & Baehr, 2006 – Southern Australia
- Nomindra ormiston Platnick & Baehr, 2006 – Australia (Northern Territory, South Australia)
- Nomindra thatch Platnick & Baehr, 2006 – Australia (Queensland)
- Nomindra woodstock Platnick & Baehr, 2006 – Australia (Western Australia)
- Nomindra yeni Platnick & Baehr, 2006 – Australia (Western Australia to Queensland)
