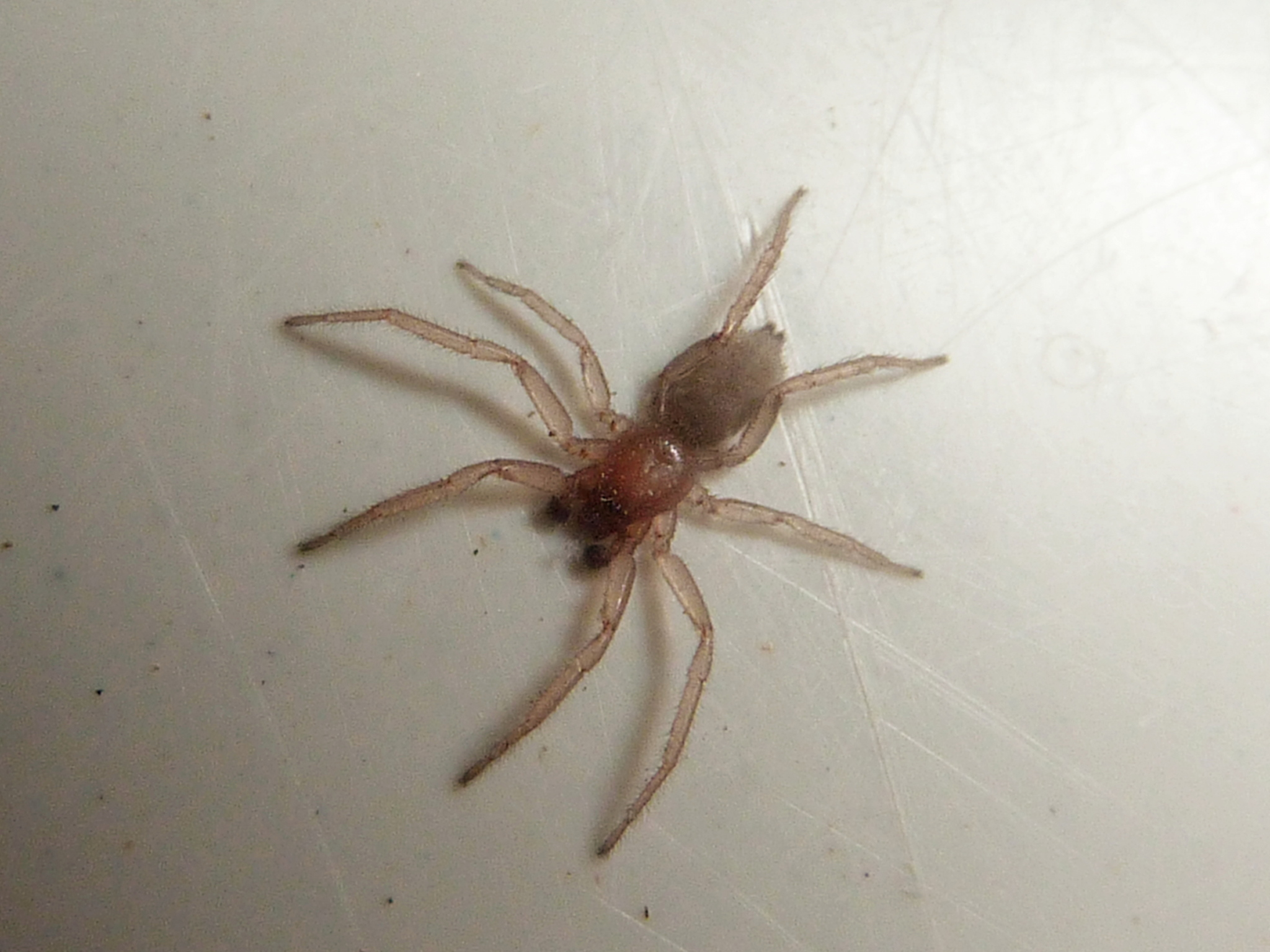
- T. mutilatus
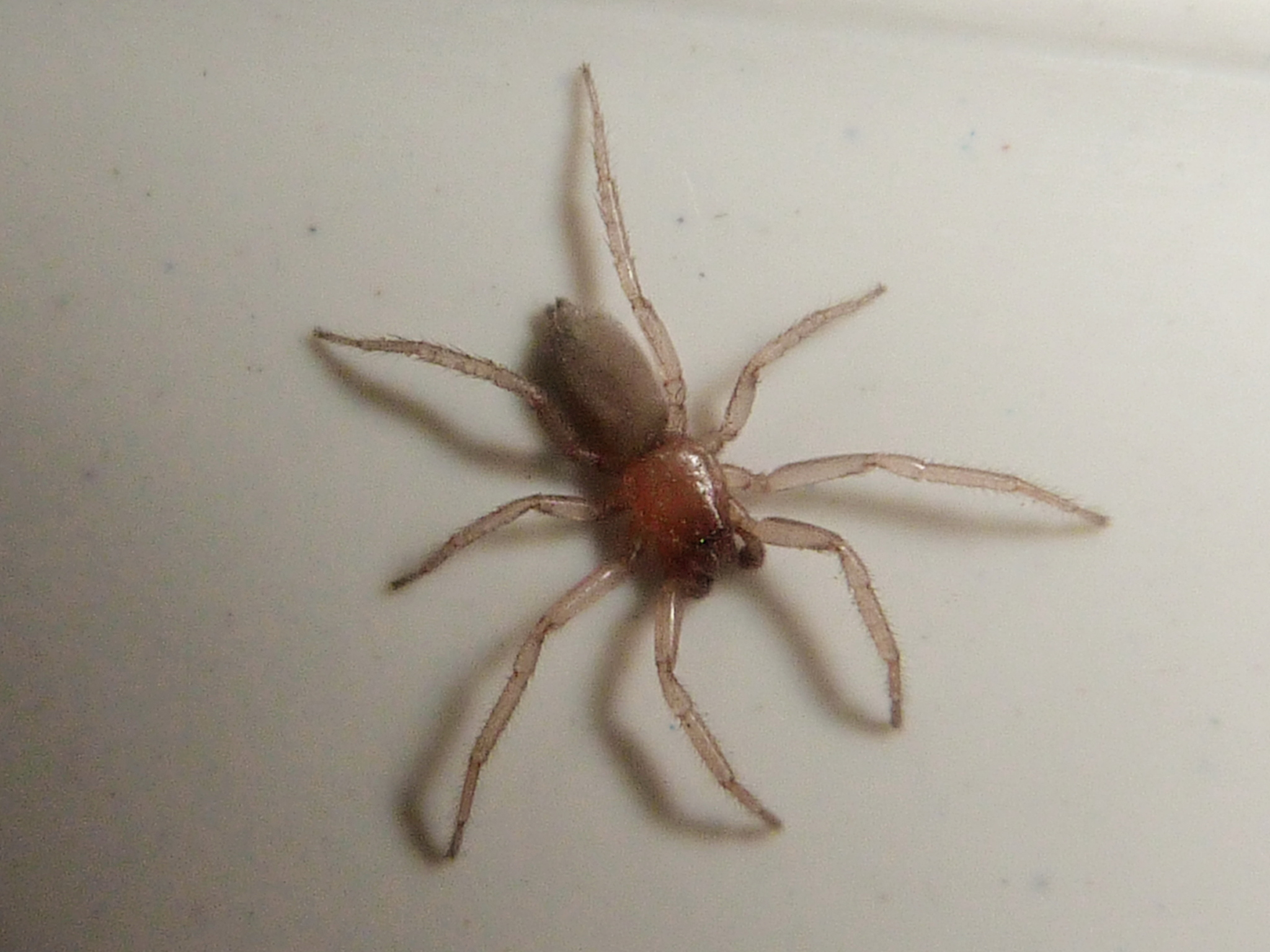

Scientific classification
- Kingdom: Animalia
- Phylum: Arthropoda
- Subphylum: Chelicerata
- Class: Arachnida
- Order: Araneae
- Infraorder: Araneomorphae
- Family: Prodidomidae
- Genus: Tricongius; Simon, 1893

Type species
- T. collinus Simon, 1893

Species
- see text

= Tricongius =

Genus of spiders

Tricongius is a genus of South American long-spinneret ground spiders that was first described by Eugène Simon in 1893.

== Species ==
As of October 2025, this genus includes seven species:

- Tricongius amazonicus Platnick & Höfer, 1990 – Brazil
- Tricongius beltraoae (Brescovit & Ramos, 2003) – Brazil
- Tricongius collinus Simon, 1893 – Venezuela (type species)
- Tricongius granadensis Mello-Leitão, 1941 – Colombia
- Tricongius mutilatus (Mello-Leitão, 1940) – Argentina
- Tricongius ribaslangei (Bonaldo & Brescovit, 1997) – Brazil
- Tricongius ybyguara (Rheims & Brescovit, 2004) – Brazil
