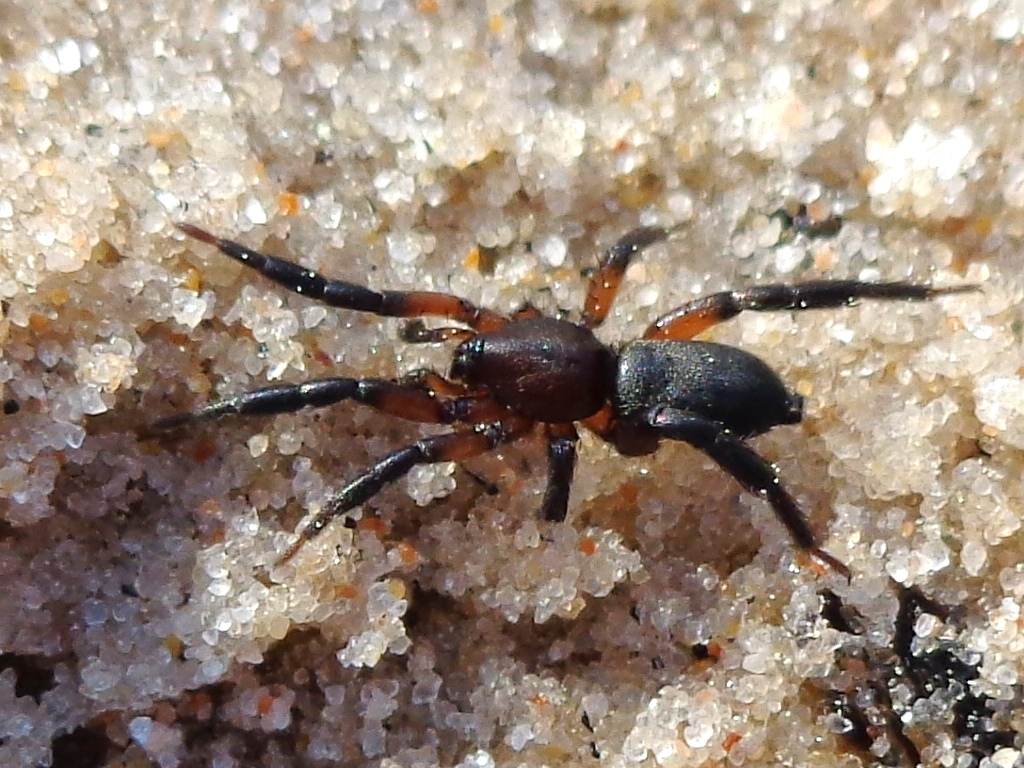
- Gnaphosa bicolor

Scientific classification
- Kingdom: Animalia
- Phylum: Arthropoda
- Subphylum: Chelicerata
- Class: Arachnida
- Order: Araneae
- Infraorder: Araneomorphae
- Clade: Entelegynae
- Clade: Dionycha
- Superfamily: Gnaphosoidea; Simon, 1893

Families
- See text

= Gnaphosoidea =

Superfamily of spiders

The Gnaphosoidea or gnaphosoids are a superfamily of araneomorph spiders with seven families. A 2014 study did not find the group to be monophyletic.

== Phylogeny ==
Gnaphosoidea has been circumscribed to contain the following families:

- Ammoxenidae
- Cithaeronidae
- Gallieniellidae
- Gnaphosidae
- Lamponidae
- Trochanteriidae

Gnaphosoidea has been placed in the Dionycha clade, itself part of the RTA clade:

- RTA clade
  - basal clades
  - - Dionycha
      - other clades
      - Gnaphosoidea
    - Grate-shaped tapetum clade (including lycosoids)

The Prodidomidae, Lamponidae and Gnaphosidae have been considered "higher gnaphosoids", sharing anterior lateral spinnerets consisting of only a single "joint" (article); the "lower gnaphosoids" (Ammoxenidae, Cithaeronidae, Gallieniellidae and Trochanteriidae) retain a distal article that is represented by an entire ring of hardened (sclerotized) cuticle. (Earlier the Lamponidae were grouped with the "lower gnaphosoids", having spinnerets of an intermediate kind.) One hypothesis for the internal phylogeny of the gnaphosoids, defined in this way, is:

- Gnaphosoidea
  - "lower gnaphosoids"
    - - Gallieniellidae
      - Trochanteridae
    - - Cithaeronidae
      - Ammoxenidae
  - "higher gnaphosoids"
    - Lamponidae
    - - Gnaphosidae
      - Prodidomidae

A 2014 study of dionychan spiders did not recover Gnaphosoidea as a monophyletic group, instead finding "gnaphosoid" families other than Gnaphosidae and Prodidomidae to be part of a larger clade, mixed in with three other dionychan families, Liocranidae, Trachelidae and Phrurolithidae. Forcing Gnaphosoidea to be monophyletic produced results described as "quite suboptimal".
