= Tivodrassus =

Scientific classification
- Kingdom: Animalia
- Phylum: Arthropoda
- Subphylum: Chelicerata
- Class: Arachnida
- Order: Araneae
- Infraorder: Araneomorphae
- Family: Prodidomidae
- Genus: Tivodrassus; Chamberlin & Ivie, 1936

Type species
- T. ethophor Chamberlin & Ivie, 1936

Species
- 4, see text

Genus of spiders

Tivodrassus is a genus of Mexican long-spinneret ground spiders that was first described by Ralph Vary Chamberlin & Vaine Wilton Ivie in 1936. It was transferred to the ground spiders in 2018, but was returned to Prodidominae in 2022.

== Species ==
As of June 2019 it contains four species, found only in Mexico:

- Tivodrassus ethophor Chamberlin & Ivie, 1936 (type) – Mexico
- Tivodrassus farias Platnick & Shadab, 1976 – Mexico
- Tivodrassus pecki Platnick & Shadab, 1976 – Mexico
- Tivodrassus reddelli Platnick & Shadab, 1976 – Mexico
