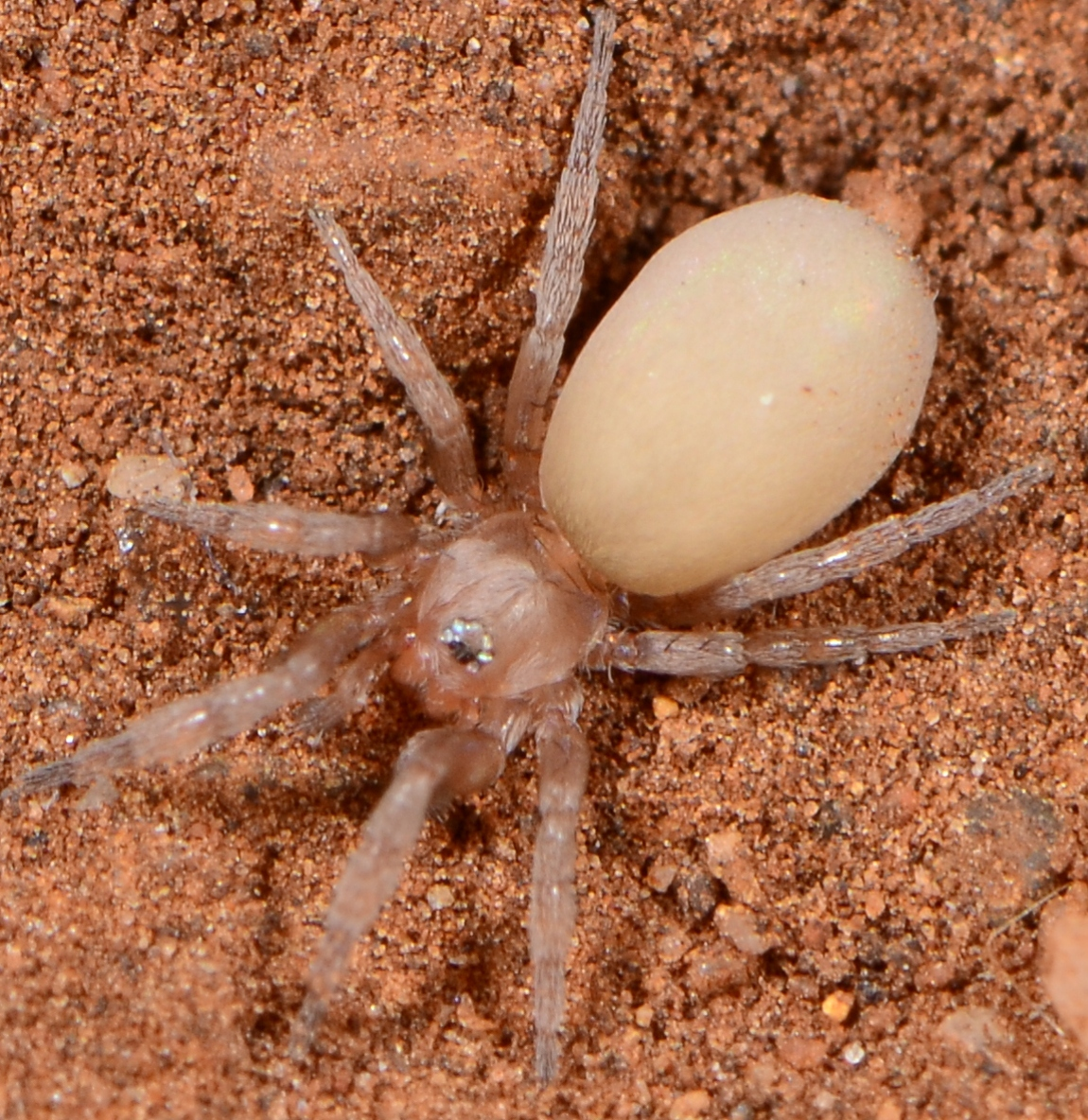
- female Eleleis limpopo
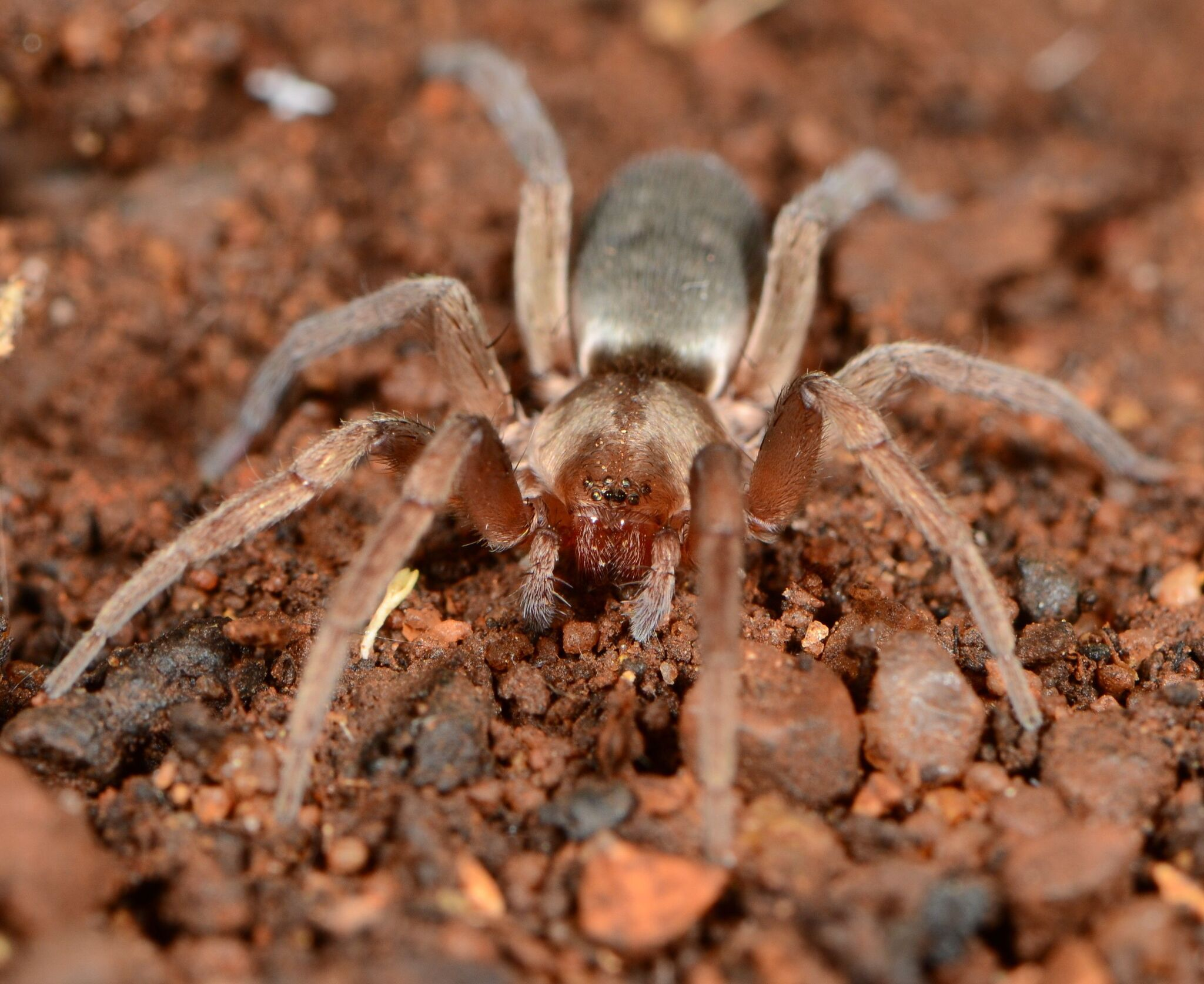
- female Theuma cedri

Scientific classification
- Kingdom: Animalia
- Phylum: Arthropoda
- Subphylum: Chelicerata
- Class: Arachnida
- Order: Araneae
- Infraorder: Araneomorphae
- Family: Prodidomidae; Simon, 1884

Genera
- 24 genera, 196 species
- blue: reported countries (WSC) green: observation hotspots (iNaturalist)

= Prodidomidae =

Long-spinneret ground spiders

Subfamily of spiders

Prodidomidae is a family of spider, sometimes called long-spinneret ground spiders. It was formerly regarded as a subfamily of Gnaphosidae, but was raised to a family in 2022.

Spiders in the family are easily identified by the greatly elongated base of the piriform gland spigots. At least parts of their body are covered with shiny scales or setae. The posterior median eyes are flat and silvery, with a triangular, egg-shaped or irregularly rectangular shape.

== Biology ==
Spiders in the Prodidomidae are ground dwellers. Most species are nocturnal and hide during the day in litter, but Myandra species, which are probably mimicking ants, seem to be active during the day. The genus Zimiris is synanthropic and thus found throughout the tropics.

== Distribution ==
Although Theuma walteri was described from Turkmenistan by Eugène Simon, it is suspected that Simon accidentally exchanged its locality with that of Anagraphis pallens (Gnaphosidae); then T. walteri would have been collected in the Cape of Good Hope, while A. pallens is from Turkmenistan.

== Genera ==
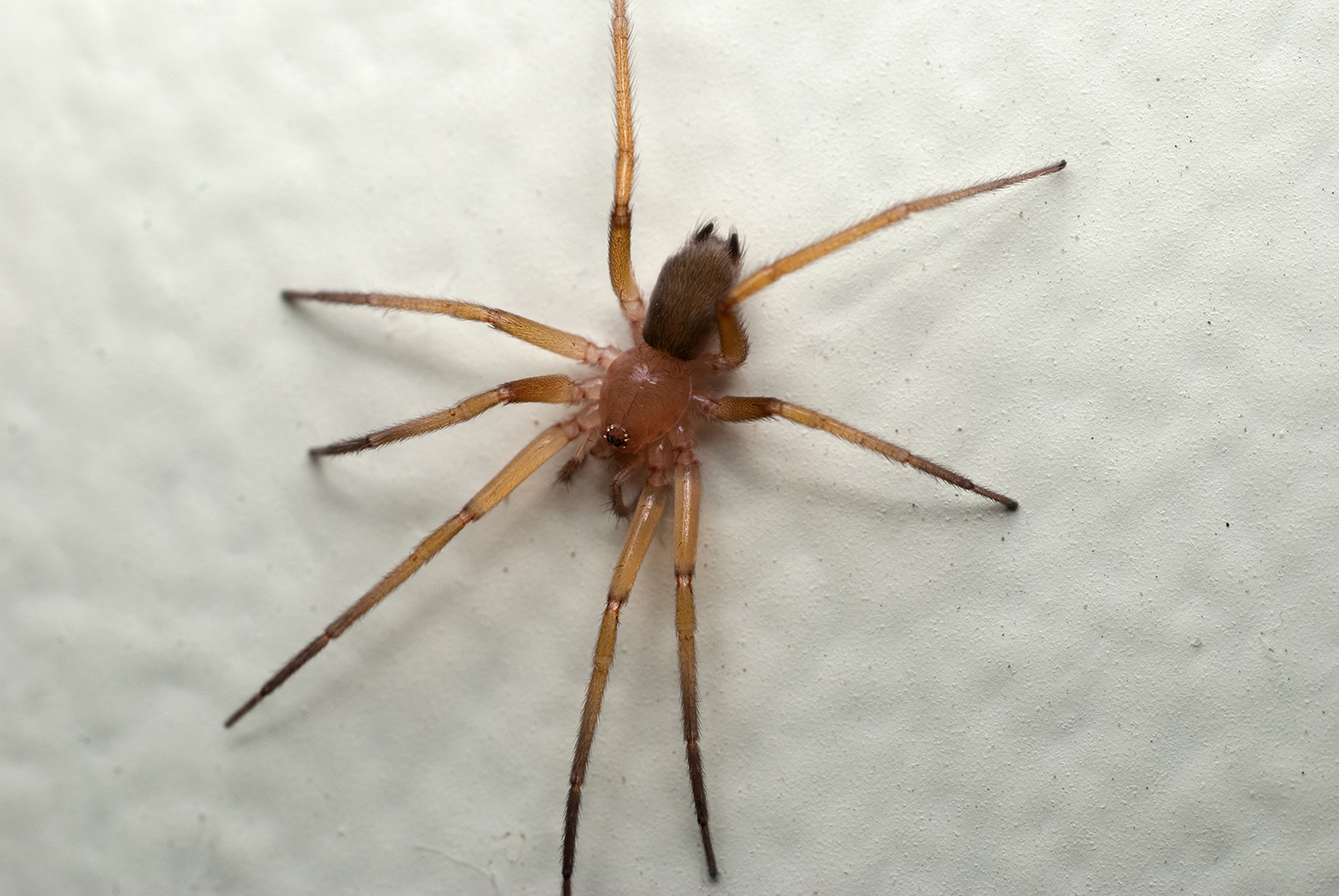
Zimiris doriae

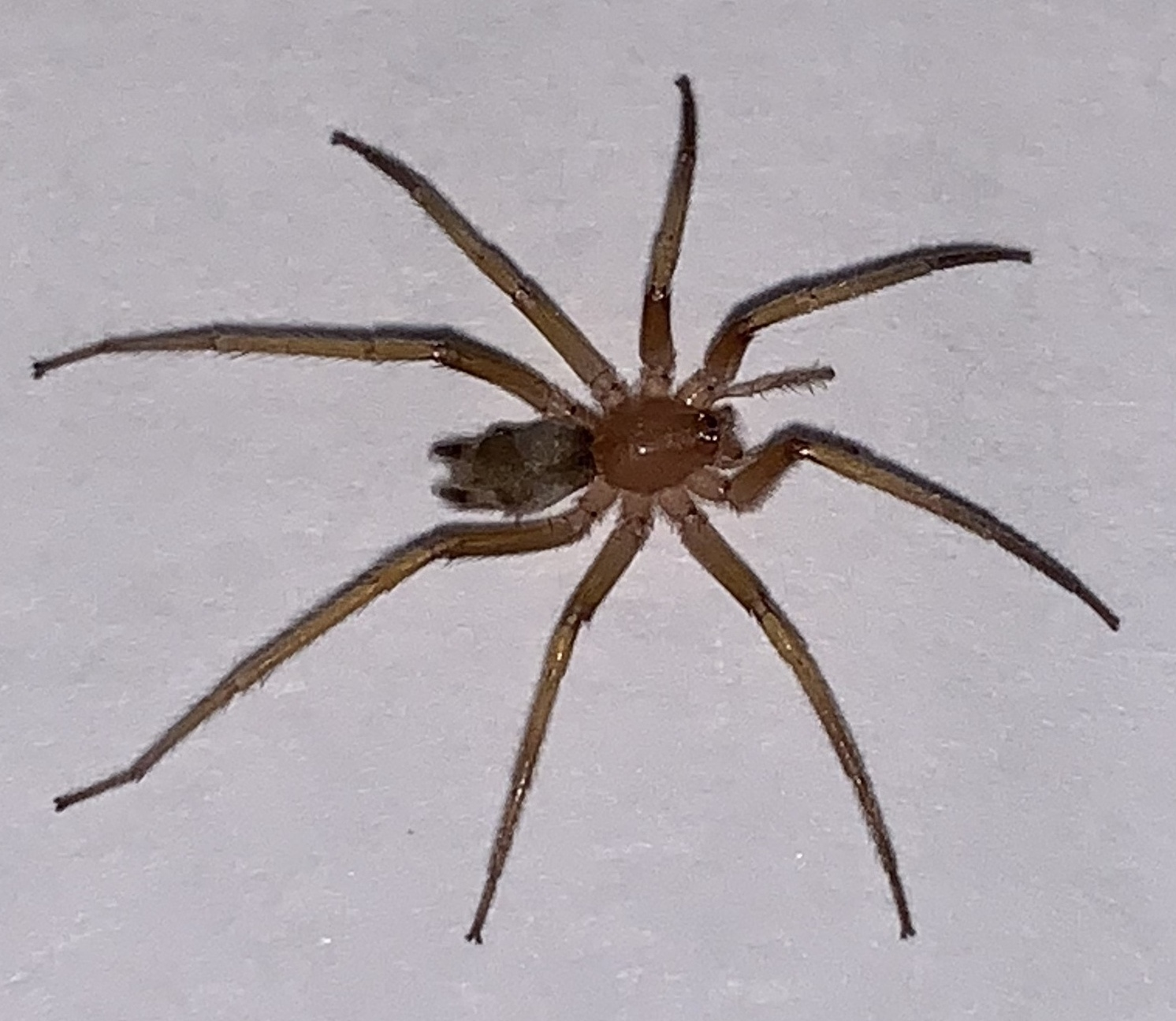
Prodidomus rufus

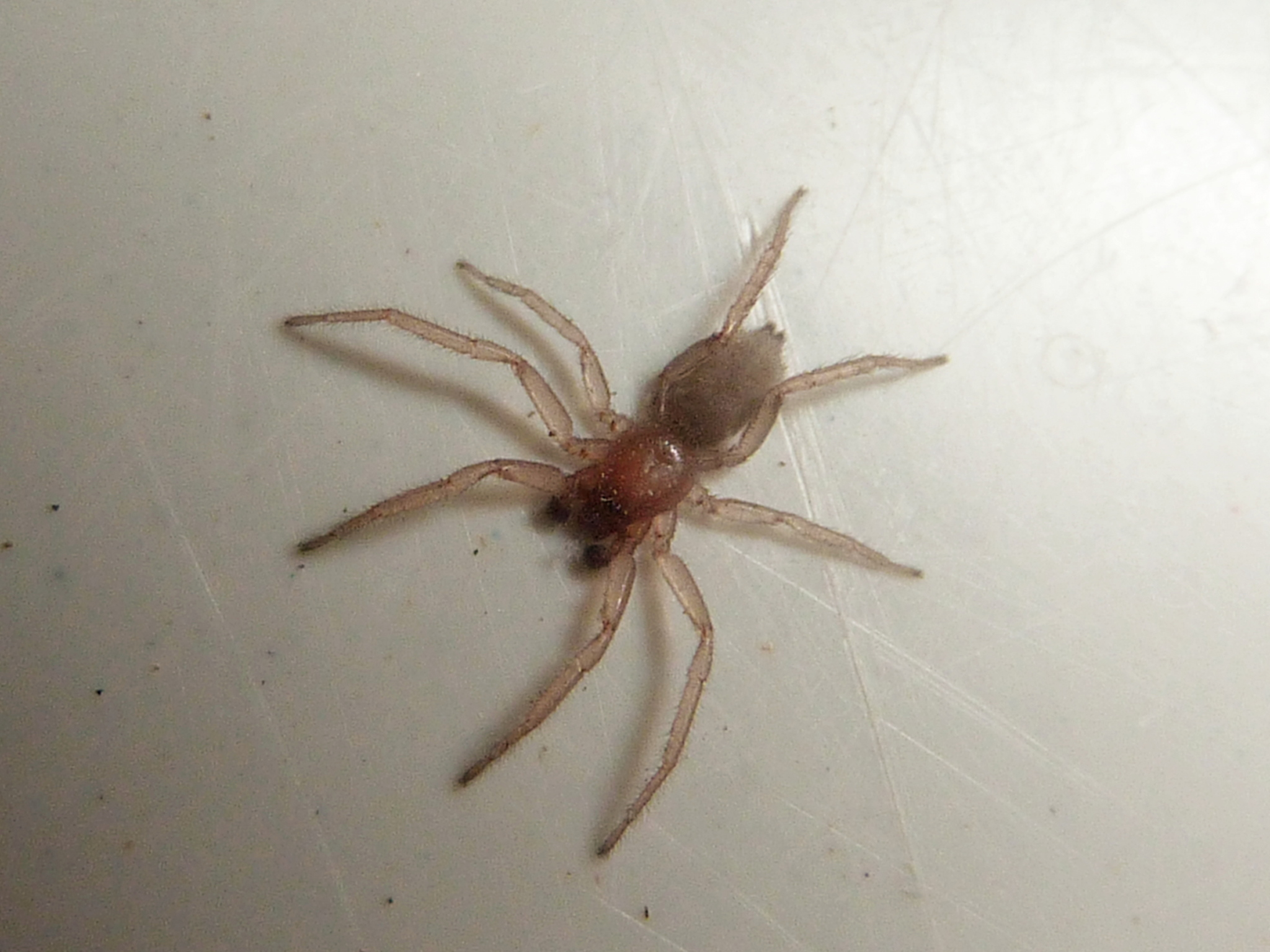
Tricongius mutilatus

As of January 2026, this family includes 24 genera and 196 species:

- Austrodomus Lawrence, 1947 – southern Africa
- Brasilomma Brescovit, Ferreira & Rheims, 2012 – Brazil
- Caudalia Alayón, 1980 – Cuba
- Chileomma Platnick, Shadab & Sorkin, 2005 – Chile
- Chileuma Platnick, Shadab & Sorkin, 2005 – Chile
- Chilongius Platnick, Shadab & Sorkin, 2005 – Chile
- Eleleis Simon, 1893 – southern Africa
- Indiani Rodrigues, Cizauskas & Lemos, 2020 – Brazil
- Lygromma Simon, 1893 – Costa Rica to Brazil, Galapagos
- Lygrommatoides Strand, 1918 – Japan
- Moreno Mello-Leitão, 1940 – Argentina, Chile
- Namundra Platnick & Bird, 2007 – Angola, Namibia, South Africa
- Neozimiris Simon, 1903 – Bahamas, Colombia, Curaçao, Galapagos, Mexico, Panama, Puerto Rico, United States, Mexico
- Nopyllus Ott, 2014 – Brazil
- Paleotoca Cizauskas, Zampaulo & Brescovit, 2024 – Brazil
- Paracymbiomma Rodrigues, Cizauskas & Rheims, 2018 – Brazil
- Plutonodomus Cooke, 1964 – Tanzania
- Prodidomus Hentz, 1847 – Mediterranean, Africa, Australia, Asia, Venezuela, Hawaii
- Purcelliana Cooke, 1964 – Namibia, South Africa
- Theuma Simon, 1893 – Africa, Turkmenistan (?)
- Tivodrassus Chamberlin & Ivie, 1936 – Mexico
- Tricongius Simon, 1893 – Argentina, Brazil, Colombia, Venezuela
- Zimirina Dalmas, 1919 – North Africa, southern Europe, South Africa
- Zimiris Simon, 1882 – Yemen (Socotra), India. Introduced circumtropical

A 2020 phylogenetic analysis involving 59 species of Prodidominae and 32 outgroup species did not recover Prodidominae as monophyletic because Anagrina did not arise within the subfamily. The study re-established Molycriinae (including genera Cryptoerithus, Molycria, Nomindra, Wesmaldra, and Wydundra) as a distinct subfamily in Gnaphosidae, a sister to Prodidominae.

== Bibliography ==
- Platnick, N.I. & Penney, D. (2004): A Revision of the Widespread Spider Genus Zimiris (Araneae, Prodidomidae). American Museum Novitates 3450.
- Platnick, Norman I. & Baehr, Barbara C. (2006): A revision of the Australasian ground spiders of the family Prodidomidae (Araneae, Gnaphosoidea). Bulletin of the American Museum of Natural History 298: 1-287. (with keys to subfamilies and genera, and picture)
